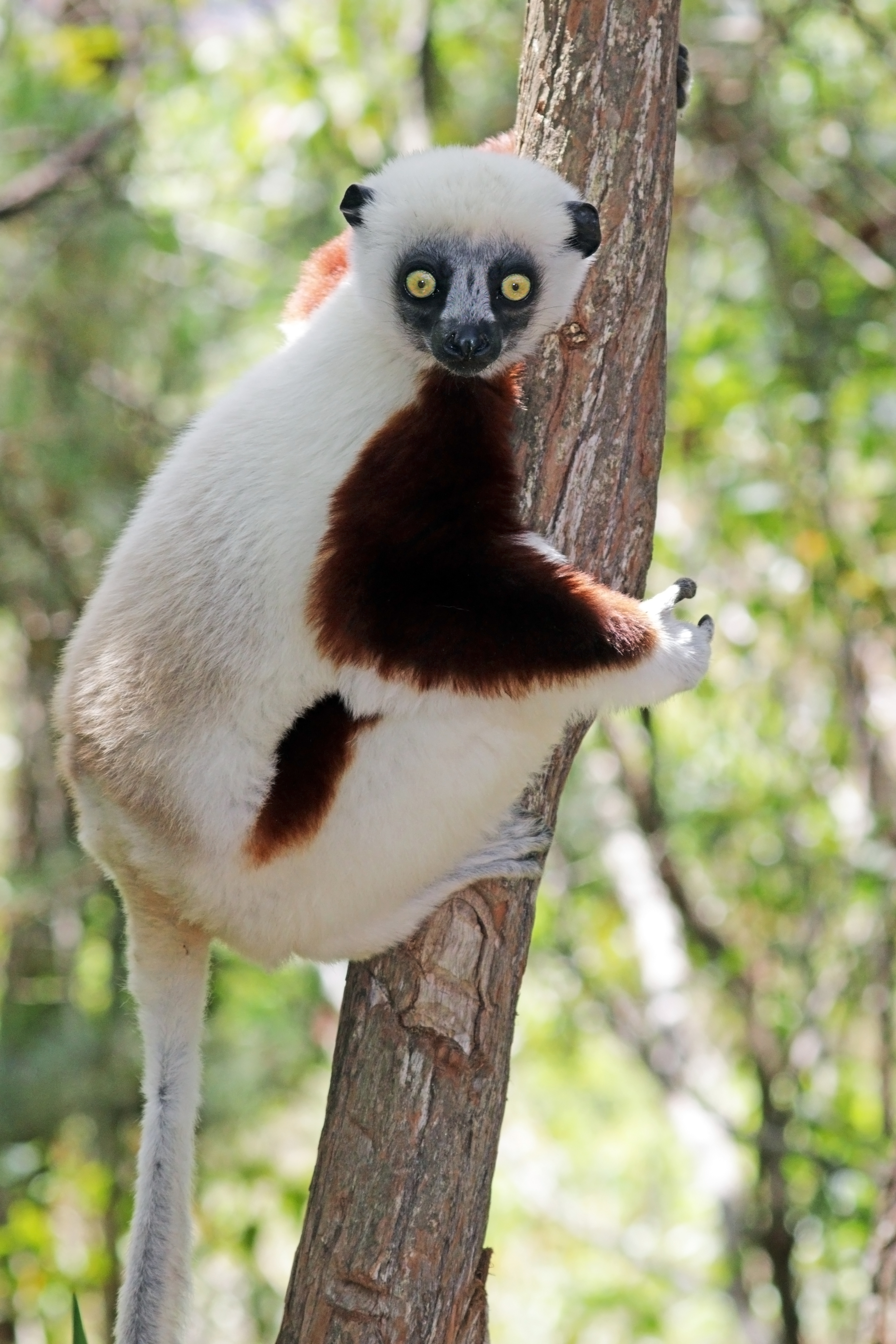
- Coquerel's sifaka (Propithecus coquereli)

Scientific classification
- Kingdom: Animalia
- Phylum: Chordata
- Class: Mammalia
- Order: Primates
- Suborder: Strepsirrhini
- Infraorder: Lemuriformes
- Superfamily: Lemuroidea; Gray 1821

Families
- †Archaeolemuridae; Cheirogaleidae; Daubentoniidae; Indriidae; Lemuridae; Lepilemuridae; †Megaladapidae; †Palaeopropithecidae

Diversity
- About 100 living species
- Range of all lemur species

= Lemur =

Lemurs Temporal range: Pleistocene–Present

Clade of primates endemic to the island of Madagascar

Lemurs (/ˈliːmərz/ LEE-mərz; from Latin lemurēs 'ghosts, spirits of the dead') are wet-nosed primates of the superfamily Lemuroidea (/ˌlɛmjʊˈrɔɪdiə/ LEM-yuu-ROY-dee-ə), divided into eight families and consisting of 15 genera and around 100 extant species. They are endemic to the island of Madagascar. Most existing lemurs are small, with a pointed snout, large eyes, and a long tail. They usually live in trees and are active at night. Lemurs share resemblance with other primates, but evolved independently from monkeys and apes. Due to Madagascar's highly seasonal climate, lemur evolution has produced a level of species diversity rivaling that of any other primate group.

Living lemurs range in weight from the 30-gram (1.1 oz) mouse lemur to the 9-kilogram (20 lb) indri. Since the arrival of humans on the island around 2,000 years ago, over a dozen species of "giant lemurs" larger than living lemur species have become extinct, including the gorilla-sized Archaeoindris. Lemurs share many common basal primate traits, such as divergent digits on their hands and feet, and nails instead of claws (in most species). However, their brain-to-body size ratio is smaller than that of anthropoid primates. As with all strepsirrhine primates, they have a "wet nose" (rhinarium).

Lemurs are generally the most social of the strepsirrhine primates, living in groups known as troops. They communicate more with scents and vocalizations than with visual signals. Lemurs have a relatively low basal metabolic rate, and as a result may exhibit dormancy such as hibernation or torpor. They also have seasonal breeding and female social dominance. Most eat a wide variety of fruits and leaves, while some are specialists. Two species of lemurs may coexist in the same forest due to different diets.

Lemur research during the 18th and 19th centuries focused on taxonomy and specimen collection. Modern studies of lemur ecology and behavior did not begin in earnest until the 1950s and 1960s. Initially hindered by political issues on Madagascar during the mid-1970s, field studies resumed in the 1980s. Lemurs are important for research because their mix of ancestral characteristics and traits shared with anthropoid primates can yield insights on primate and human evolution. Most species have been discovered or promoted to full species status since the 1990s; however, lemur taxonomic classification is controversial and depends on which species concept is used.

Many lemur species remain endangered due to habitat loss and hunting. Although local traditions, such as fady, generally help protect lemurs and their forests, illegal logging, economic privation and political instability conspire to thwart conservation efforts. Because of these threats and their declining numbers, the International Union for Conservation of Nature (IUCN) considers lemurs to be the world's most endangered mammals, noting that as of 2013 up to 90% of all lemur species confront the threat of extinction in the wild within the next 20 to 25 years. Ring-tailed lemurs are an iconic flagship species. Collectively, lemurs exemplify the biodiverse fauna of Madagascar and have facilitated the emergence of ecotourism. In addition, conservation organizations increasingly seek to implement community-based approaches to save lemur species and promote sustainability.

== Etymology ==
Carl Linnaeus, the founder of modern binomial nomenclature, gave lemurs their name as early as 1758. With his declaration of the genus Lemur in the 10th edition of Systema Naturae, he included three species: Lemur tardigradus (the red slender loris, now known as Loris tardigradus), Lemur catta (the ring-tailed lemur), and Lemur volans (the Philippine colugo, now known as Cynocephalus volans). Although the term lemur was first intended for slender lorises, it was soon limited to the endemic Malagasy primates, which have been known as collectively "lemurs" ever since.

The name lemur is derived from the Latin term lemures, which refers to specters or ghosts that were exorcised during the Lemuria festival of ancient Rome. Linnaeus was familiar with the works of Virgil and Ovid, both of whom mentioned lemures. Seeing an analogy that fit with his naming scheme, he adapted the term "lemur" for these nocturnal primates.

It was noted in 2012 that many sources had commonly and falsely assumed that Linnaeus was referring to the ghost-like appearance, reflective eyes, and ghostly cries of Madagascar's lemurs when he selected the name. Up until then, it had also been speculated that Linnaeus may also have known that some Malagasy people believed that lemurs were the souls of their ancestors. However, both claims were discredited since according to Linnaeus' own explanation, the term lemur was selected because of the nocturnal activity and slow movements of the red slender loris:

Lemures dixi hos, quod noctu imprimis obambulant, hominibus quodanmodo similes, & lento passu vagantur.

I call them lemurs, because they go around mainly by night, in a certain way similar to humans, and roam with a slow pace.

— Carl Linnaeus, Museum Adolphi Friderici Regis

== Evolutionary history ==
Lemurs are primates belonging to the suborder Strepsirrhini. Like other strepsirrhine primates, such as lorises, pottos, and galagos, they share ancestral (or plesiomorphic) traits with early primates. In this regard, lemurs are popularly confused with ancestral primates; however, lemurs did not give rise to monkeys and apes (simians). Instead, they evolved independently in isolation on Madagascar. All modern strepsirrhines including lemurs are traditionally thought to have evolved from early primates known as adapiforms during the Eocene (56 to 34 mya) or Paleocene (66 to 56 mya). Adapiforms, however, lack a specialized arrangement of teeth, known as a toothcomb, which nearly all living strepsirrhines possess. A more recent hypothesis is that lemurs descended from lorisoids (loris-like) primates. This is supported by comparative studies of the cytochrome b gene and the presence of the strepsirrhine toothcomb in both groups. Instead of being the direct ancestors of lemurs, the adapiforms may have given rise to both the lemurs and lorisoids, a split that would be supported by molecular phylogenetic studies. The later split between lemurs and lorises is thought to have occurred approximately 62 to 65 mya according to molecular studies, although other genetic tests and the fossil record in Africa suggest more conservative estimates of 50 to 55 mya for this divergence. However, the oldest lemur fossils on Madagascar are actually subfossils dating to the Late Pleistocene.

Once part of the supercontinent Gondwana, the island of Madagascar has been isolated since it broke away from eastern Africa (~160 mya), Antarctica (~80–130 mya), and India (~80–90 mya). Since ancestral lemurs are thought to have originated in Africa around 62 to 65 mya, they must have crossed the Mozambique Channel, a deep channel between Africa and Madagascar with a minimum width of about 560 km (350 mi). In 1915, paleontologist William Diller Matthew noted that the mammalian biodiversity on Madagascar (including lemurs) can only be accounted for by random rafting events, where very small populations rafted from nearby Africa on tangled mats of vegetation, which get flushed out to sea from major rivers. This form of biological dispersal can occur randomly over millions of years. In the 1940s, American paleontologist George Gaylord Simpson coined the term "sweepstakes hypothesis" for such random events. Rafting has since been the most accepted explanation for the lemur colonization of Madagascar, but until recently, this trip was thought to be very unlikely because strong ocean currents flow away from the island. In January 2010, a report demonstrated that around 60 mya both Madagascar and Africa were 1,650 km (1,030 mi) south of their present-day positions, placing them in a different ocean gyre, producing currents that ran counter to what they are today. The ocean currents were shown to be even stronger than today, which would have pushed a raft along faster, shortening the trip to 30 days or less—short enough for a small mammal to survive easily. As the continental plates drifted northward, the currents gradually changed, and by 20 mya the window for oceanic dispersal had closed, effectively isolating the lemurs and the rest of the terrestrial Malagasy fauna from mainland Africa. Isolated on Madagascar with only a limited number of mammalian competitors, the lemurs did not have to compete with other evolving arboreal mammalian groups, such as squirrels. They were also spared from having to compete with monkeys, which evolved later. The intelligence, aggression, and deceptiveness of monkeys gave them an advantage over other primates in exploiting the environment.

== Distribution and diversity ==
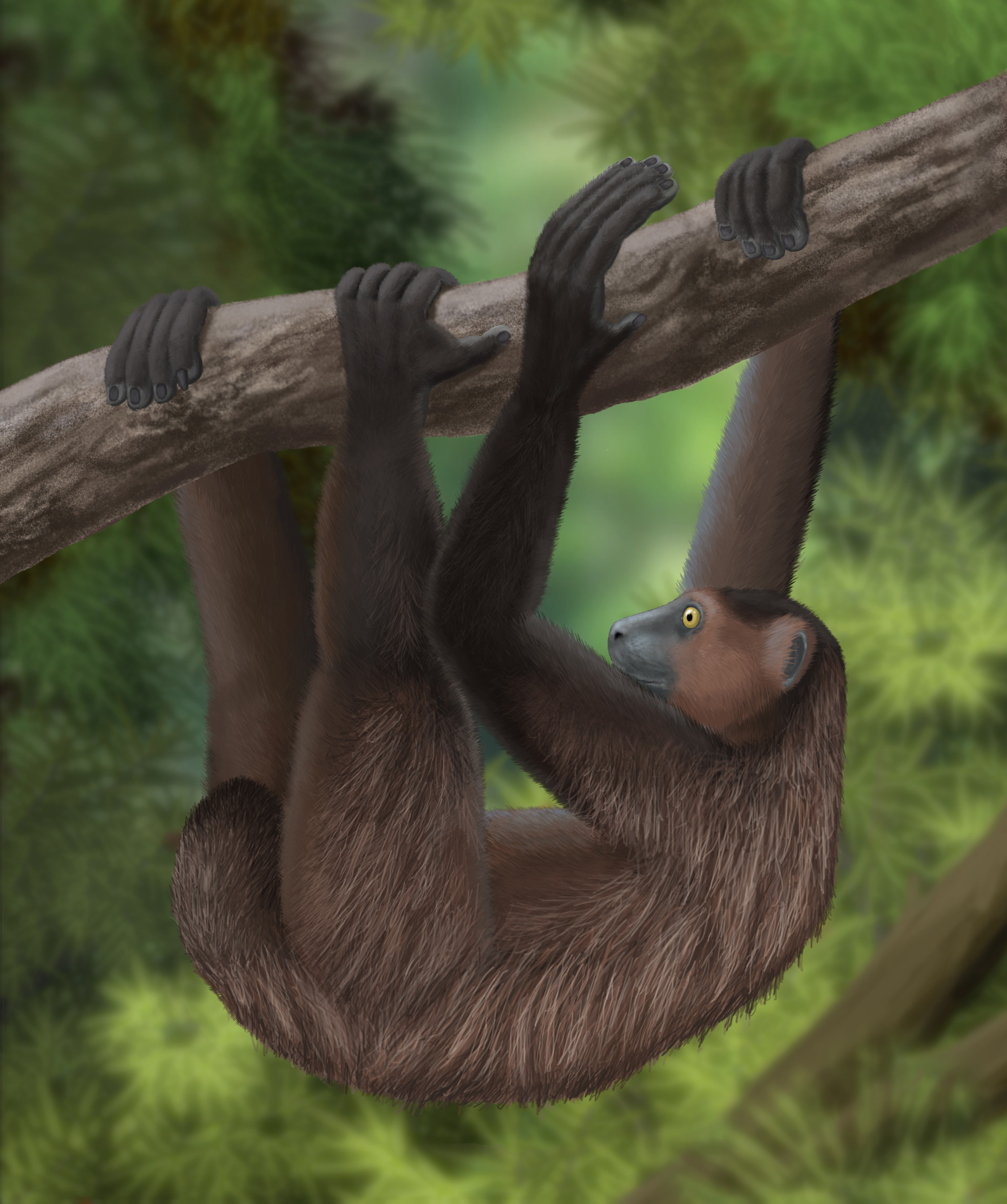
A life restoration of Babakotia radofilai, a sloth lemur that became extinct less than two thousand years ago

Lemurs have adapted to fill many open ecological niches since making their way to Madagascar. Their diversity in both behavior and morphology (outward appearance) rivals that of the monkeys and apes found elsewhere in the world. Ranging in size from the 30 g (1.1 oz) Madame Berthe's mouse lemur, the world's smallest primate, to the recently extinct 160–200 kg (350–440 lb) Archaeoindris fontoynonti, lemurs evolved diverse forms of locomotion, varying levels of social complexity, and unique adaptations to the local climate.

Lemurs lack any shared traits that make them stand out from all other primates. Different types of lemurs have evolved unique combinations of unusual traits to cope with Madagascar's harsh, seasonal climate. These traits can include seasonal fat storage, hypometabolism (including torpor and hibernation), small group sizes, low encephalization (relative brain size), cathemerality (activity both day and night), and strict breeding seasons. Extreme resource limitations and seasonal breeding are also thought to have given rise to three other relatively common lemur traits: female social dominance, sexual monomorphism, and male–male competition for mates involving low levels of agonism, such as sperm competition.

Before the arrival of humans roughly 1500 to 2000 years ago, lemurs were found all across the island. However, early settlers quickly converted the forests to rice paddies and grassland through slash-and-burn agriculture (known locally as tavy), restricting lemurs to approximately 10% of the island's area, ~60,000 km^{2} (23,000 sq mi). Today, the diversity and complexity of lemur communities increases with floral diversity and precipitation and is highest in the rainforests of the east coast. Despite their adaptations for weathering extreme adversity, habitat destruction and hunting have resulted in lemur populations declining sharply, and their diversity has diminished, with the recent extinction of at least 17 species in eight genera, known collectively as the subfossil lemurs. Most of the approximately 100 species and subspecies of lemur are either threatened or endangered. Unless trends change, extinctions are likely to continue.

Until recently, giant lemurs existed on Madagascar. Now represented only by recent or subfossil remains, they were modern forms that were once part of the rich lemur diversity that has evolved in isolation. Some of their adaptations were unlike those seen in their living relatives. All 17 extinct lemurs were larger than the extant (living) forms, some weighing as much as 200 kg (440 lb), and are thought to have been active during the day. Not only were they unlike the living lemurs in both size and appearance, they also filled ecological niches that either no longer exist or are now left unoccupied. Large parts of Madagascar, which are now devoid of forests and lemurs, once hosted diverse primate communities that included more than 20 lemur species covering the full range of lemur sizes.

== Taxonomic classification and phylogeny ==
Competing lemur phylogenies

- Lemuroidea
  - Daubentoniidae
  - - Lemuridae
    - - Indriidae
      - - Lepilemuridae
        - Cheirogaleidae

- Lemuroidea
  - Daubentoniidae
  - - Lepilemuridae
    - - Cheirogaleidae
      - - - Lemuridae
          - †Megaladapidae
        - - Indriidae
          - †Palaeopropithecidae
          - †Archaeolemuridae

There are two competing lemur phylogenies, one by Horvath et al. (top) and one by Orlando et al. (bottom). Note that Horvath et al. did not attempt to place the subfossil lemurs.

From a taxonomic standpoint, the term "lemur" originally referred to the genus Lemur, which currently contains only the ring-tailed lemur. The term is now used in the colloquial sense in reference to all Malagasy primates.

Lemur taxonomy is controversial, and not all experts agree, particularly with the recent increase in the number of recognized species. According to Russell Mittermeier, the president of Conservation International (CI), taxonomist Colin Groves, and others, there are nearly 100 recognized species or subspecies of extant (or living) lemur, divided into five families and 15 genera. Because genetic data indicates that the recently extinct subfossil lemurs were closely related to living lemurs, an additional three families, eight genera, and 17 species can be included in the total. In contrast, other experts have labeled this as taxonomic inflation, instead preferring a total closer to 50 species.

The classification of lemurs within the suborder Strepsirrhini is equally controversial, although most experts agree on the same phylogenetic tree. In one taxonomy, the infraorder Lemuriformes contains all living strepsirrhines in two superfamilies, Lemuroidea for all lemurs and Lorisoidea for the lorisoids (lorisids and galagos). Alternatively, the lorisoids are sometimes placed in their own infraorder, Lorisiformes, separate from the lemurs. In another taxonomy published by Colin Groves, the aye-aye was placed in its own infraorder, Chiromyiformes, while the rest of the lemurs were placed in Lemuriformes and the lorisoids in Lorisiformes.

Although it is generally agreed that the aye-aye is the most basal member of the lemur clade, the relationship between the other four families is less clear since they diverged during a narrow 10 to 12 million-year window between the Late Eocene (42 mya) and into the Oligocene (30 mya). The two main competing hypotheses are shown in the adjacent image.

Competing taxonomic nomenclature for lemurs and their kin
2 infraorders	3 infraorders	4 infraorders
Order Primates; Suborder Strepsirrhini; Infraorder †Adapiformes; Infraorder Lemuriformes; Superfamily Lemuroidea; Family †Archaeolemuridae; Family Cheirogaleidae; Family Daubentoniidae; Family Indriidae; Family Lemuridae; Family Lepilemuridae; Family †Megaladapidae; Family †Palaeopropithecidae; Superfamily Lorisoidea; Suborder Haplorhini	Order Primates; Suborder Strepsirrhini; Infraorder †Adapiformes; Infraorder Lemuriformes; Superfamily Lemuroidea; Family †Archaeolemuridae; Family Cheirogaleidae; Family Daubentoniidae; Family Indriidae; Family Lemuridae; Family Lepilemuridae; Family †Megaladapidae; Family †Palaeopropithecidae; Infraorder Lorisiformes; Suborder Haplorhini	Order Primates; Suborder Strepsirrhini; Infraorder †Adapiformes; Infraorder Chiromyiformes; Infraorder Lemuriformes; Superfamily Cheirogaleoidea; Family Cheirogaleidae; Superfamily Lemuroidea; Family †Archaeolemuridae; Family Indriidae; Family Lemuridae; Family Lepilemuridae; Family †Megaladapidae; Family †Palaeopropithecidae; Infraorder Lorisiformes; Suborder Haplorhini

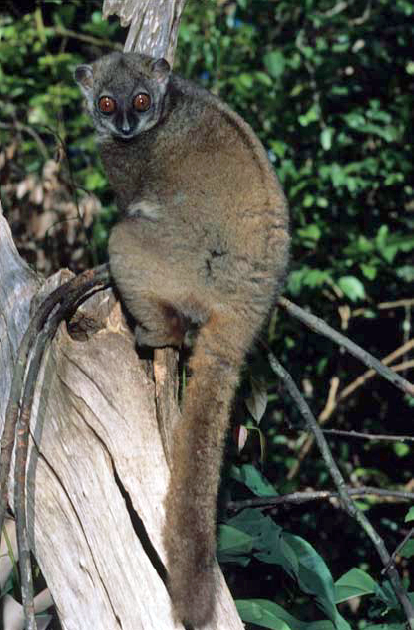
The Sahamalaza sportive lemur (Lepilemur sahamalazensis) was identified as a distinct species in 2006.

Lemur taxonomy has changed significantly since the first taxonomic classification of lemurs by Carl Linnaeus in 1758. One of the greatest challenges has been the classification of the aye-aye, which has been a topic of debate up until very recently. Until Richard Owen published a definitive anatomical study in 1866, early naturalists were uncertain whether the aye-aye (genus Daubentonia) was a primate, rodent, or marsupial. However, the placement of the aye-aye within the order Primates remained problematic until very recently. Based on its anatomy, researchers have found support for classifying the genus Daubentonia as a specialized indriid, a sister group to all strepsirrhines, and as an indeterminate taxon within the order Primates. Molecular tests have now shown Daubentoniidae is basal to all Lemuriformes, and in 2008, Russell Mittermeier, Colin Groves, and others ignored addressing higher-level taxonomy by defining lemurs as monophyletic and containing five living families, including Daubentoniidae.

Relationships among lemur families have also proven to be problematic and have yet to be definitively resolved. To further complicate the issue, several Paleogene fossil primates from outside Madagascar, such as Bugtilemur, have been classified as lemurs. However, scientific consensus does not accept these assignments based on genetic evidence, and therefore it is generally accepted that the Malagasy primates are monophyletic. Another area of contention is the relationship between the sportive lemurs and the extinct koala lemurs (Megaladapidae). Formerly grouped in the same family due to similarities in dentition, they are no longer considered to be closely related due to genetic studies.

More taxonomic changes have occurred at the genus level, although these revisions have proven more conclusive, often supported by genetic and molecular analysis. The most noticeable revisions included the gradual split of a broadly defined genus Lemur into separate genera for the ring-tailed lemur, ruffed lemurs, and brown lemurs due to a host of morphological differences.

Due to several taxonomic revisions by Russell Mittermeier, Colin Groves, and others, the number of recognized lemur species has grown from 33 species and subspecies in 1994 to approximately 100 in 2008. With continuing cytogenetic and molecular genetic research, as well as ongoing field studies, particularly with cryptic species such as mouse lemurs, the number of recognized lemur species is likely to keep growing. However, the rapid increase in the number of recognized species has had its critics among taxonomists and lemur researchers. Since classifications ultimately depend on the species concept used, conservationists often favor definitions that result in the splitting of genetically distinct populations into separate species to gain added environmental protection. Others favor a more thorough analysis.

== Anatomy and physiology ==
Lemurs vary greatly in size. They include the smallest primates in the world and, until recently, also included some of the largest. They currently range in size from about 30 g (1.1 oz) for Madame Berthe's mouse lemur (Microcebus berthae) up to 7–9 kg (15–20 lb) for the indri (Indri indri) and diademed sifaka (Propithecus diadema). One recently extinct species rivaled the gorilla in size, at 160–200 kg (350–440 lb) for Archaeoindris fontoynonti.

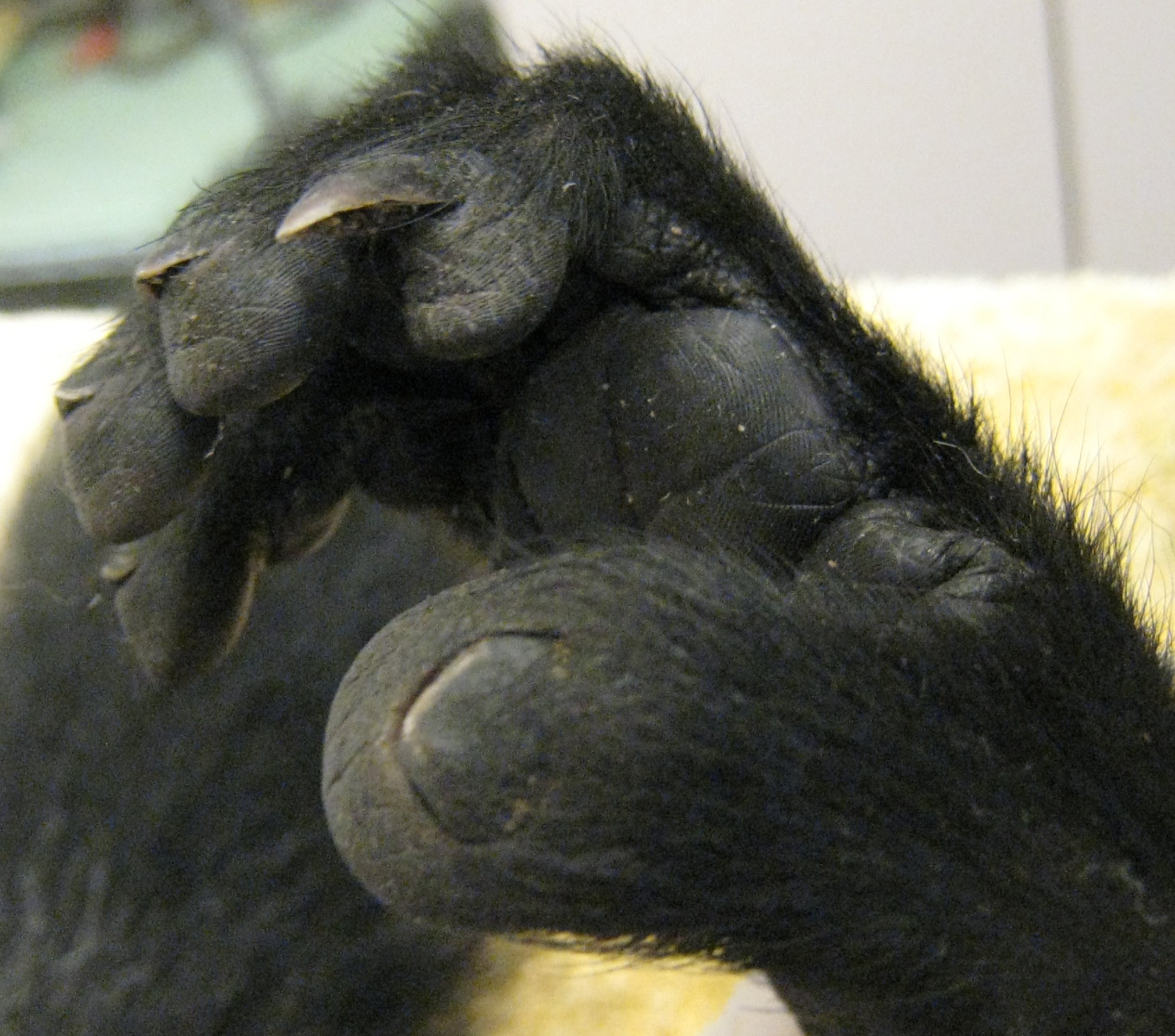
Close-up of a ruffed lemur's foot, showing the toilet-claw on the second toe and nails on all other toes

Like all primates, lemurs have five divergent digits with nails (in most cases) on their hands and feet. Most lemurs possess a laterally compressed, elongated nail, called a toilet-claw, on the second toe and use it for scratching and grooming. In addition to the toilet-claw, lemurs share a variety of other traits with other strepsirrhine primates, which include a rhinarium (or "wet nose"); a fully functional vomeronasal organ, which detects pheromones; a postorbital bar and the lack of postorbital closure (a wall of thin bone behind the eye); orbits (bony sockets that enclose the eye) that are not fully facing forward; left and right mandible (lower jaw) bones that are not fully fused; and a small brain-to-body mass ratio.

Additional traits shared with other prosimian primates (strepsirrhine primates and tarsiers) include a bicornuate (two-horned) uterus and epitheliochorial placentation. Because their thumbs are only pseudo-opposable, making their movement less independent of the other fingers, their hands are less than perfect at grasping and manipulating objects. On their feet, they have a widely abducted hallux (first toe) which facilitates the grasping of tree limbs. A common misconception is that lemurs have a prehensile tail, a trait found only in New World monkeys, particularly atelids, among primates. Lemurs also rely heavily on their sense of smell, a trait shared with most other mammals and early primates, but not with the visually oriented higher primates. This sense of smell is important in terms of marking territory as well as provide an indication of whether or not another lemur is a viable breeding partner.

Lemurs are a diverse group of primates in terms of morphology and physiology. Some lemurs, such as the sportive lemurs and indriids, have longer hind limbs than forelimbs, making them excellent leapers. Indriids also have a specialized digestive system for folivory, exhibiting enlarged salivary glands, a spacious stomach, and an elongated caecum (lower gut) that facilitates fermentation. The hairy-eared dwarf lemur (Allocebus trichotis) reportedly has a very long tongue, allowing it to feed on nectar. Likewise, the red-bellied lemur (Eulemur rubriventer) has a feathery brush-shaped tongue, also uniquely adapted to feed on nectar and pollen. The aye-aye has evolved some traits that are unique among primates, making it stand out among the lemurs. Such traits include continuously growing, rodent-like front teeth for gnawing through wood and hard seeds; a highly mobile, filiform (filament-shaped) middle finger for extracting food from tiny holes; large, bat-like ears for detecting hollow spaces within trees; and use of self-generated acoustical cues to forage.

Lemurs are unusual since they have great variability in their social structure, yet generally lack sexual dimorphism in size and canine tooth morphology. However, some species tend towards having larger females, and two species of true lemur (genus Eulemur), the gray-headed lemur (E. albocollaris) and the red lemur (E. rufus), exhibit size differences in canine teeth. True lemurs show sexual dichromatism (sexual differences in fur coloration), but the difference between the genders varies from strikingly obvious, as in the blue-eyed black lemur (E. macaco), to nearly imperceptible in the case of the common brown lemur (E. fulvus).

Crypsis, or the inability of humans to visually distinguish between two or more distinct species, has recently been discovered among lemurs, particularly within the sportive lemurs (Lepilemur) and mouse lemurs (Microcebus). With sportive lemurs, subspecies were traditionally defined based on slight morphological differences, but new genetic evidence has supported giving full species status to these regional populations. In the case of mouse lemurs, the gray mouse lemur (M. murinus), golden-brown mouse lemur (M. ravelobensis), and Goodman's mouse lemur (M. lehilahytsara) were considered the same species until recently, when genetic tests identified them as cryptic species.

=== Dentition ===
The lemur dentition is heterodont (having multiple tooth morphologies) and derives from an ancestral primate permanent dentition of 2.1.3.32.1.3.3. Indriids, sportive lemurs, the aye-aye, and the extinct sloth lemurs, monkey lemurs, and koala lemurs have reduced dentitions, having lost incisors, canines, or premolars. The ancestral deciduous dentition is 2.1.32.1.3, but young indriids, aye-ayes, koala lemurs, sloth lemurs, and probably monkey lemurs have fewer deciduous teeth.

Lemur deciduous and permanent dentitions
Family	Deciduous dental formula	Permanent dental formula
Cheirogaleidae, Lemuridae	2.1.32.1.3 × 2 = 24	2.1.3.32.1.3.3 × 2 = 36
Lepilemuridae	2.1.32.1.3 × 2 = 24	0.1.3.32.1.3.3 × 2 = 32
†Archaeolemuridae	2.1.32.0.3 × 2 = 22	2.1.3.31.1.3.3 × 2 = 34
†Megaladapidae	1.1.32.1.3 × 2 = 22	0.1.3.32.1.3.3 × 2 = 32
Indriidae, †Palaeopropithecidae	2.1.22.1.3 × 2 = 22 (Note: No infant Mesopropithecus, Babakotia, or Archaeoindris remains have been found, and little is known about the deciduous dentition of Palaeopropithecus. Developmental patterns are inferred from the developmental patterns of their closest relatives, the indriids.)	2.1.2.32.0.2.3 × 2 = 30 (Note: In indriids, either a pair of deciduous lower incisors or lower canines are not replaced in permanent dentition. Differing interpretations of this yield different dental formulae. Therefore an alternative dental formula for this family is 2.1.2.31.1.2.3 × 2 = 30.)
Daubentoniidae	1.1.21.1.2 × 2 = 16	1.0.1.31.0.0.3 × 2 = 18

There are also noticeable differences in dental morphology and tooth topography between lemurs. Indri, for instance, have teeth that are perfectly adapted for shearing leaves and crushing seeds. In the toothcomb of most lemurs, the bottom incisors and canine teeth are procumbent (face forward rather than up) and finely spaced, thus providing a tool for either grooming or feeding. For instance, indri use their toothcomb not only for grooming, but also to pry out the large seeds from the tough epicarp of Beilschmiedia fruits, while fork-marked lemurs use their relatively long toothcomb to cut through tree bark to induce the flow of tree sap. The toothcomb is kept clean by the sublingua or "under-tongue", a specialized structure that acts like a toothbrush to remove hair and other debris. The sublingua extends below the tip of the tongue and is tipped with keratinized, serrated points that rake between the front teeth.

Only the aye-aye, the extinct giant aye-aye, and the largest of the extinct giant sloth lemurs lack a functional strepsirrhine toothcomb. In the case of the aye-aye, the morphology of the deciduous incisors, which are lost shortly after birth, indicates that its ancestors had a toothcomb. These milk teeth are lost shortly after birth and are replaced by open-rooted, continually growing (hypselodont) incisors.

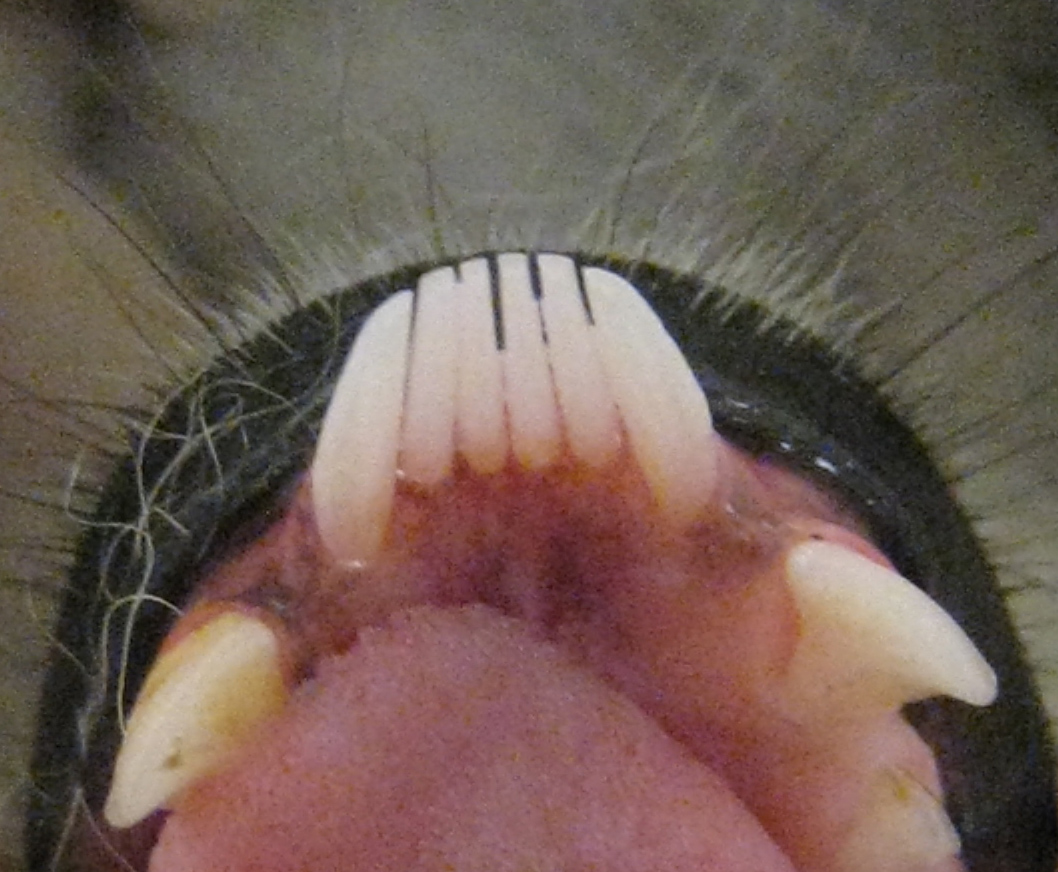
A six-tooth version of the strepsirrhine toothcomb in a ring-tailed lemur, with canine-like premolars behind it

The toothcomb in lemurs normally consists of six teeth (four incisors and two canines), although indriids, monkey lemurs, and some sloth lemurs only have a four-tooth toothcomb due to the loss of either a pair of canines or incisors. Because the lower canine is either included in the toothcomb or lost, the lower dentition can be difficult to read, especially since the first premolar (P2) is often shaped like a canine (caniniform) to fill the canine's role. In folivorous (leaf-eating) lemurs, except for indriids, the upper incisors are greatly reduced or absent. Used together with the toothcomb on the mandible (lower jaw), this complex is reminiscent of an ungulate browsing pad.

Lemurs are unusual among primates for their rapid dental development, particularly among the largest species. For example, indriids have relatively slow body growth but extremely fast tooth formation and eruption. By contrast, anthropoid primates exhibit slower dental development with increased size and slower morphological development. Lemurs are also dentally precocious at birth, and have their full permanent dentition at weaning.

Lemurs generally have thin tooth enamel compared to anthropoid primates. This may result in extra wear and breakage to the anterior (front) teeth due to heavy use in grooming, feeding, and fighting. Little other dental health information is available for lemurs, except that wild ring-tailed lemurs at Berenty Private Reserve occasionally exhibit abscessed maxillary canines (seen as open wounds on the muzzle) and tooth decay, possibly due to the consumption of non-native foods.

=== Senses ===
The sense of smell, or olfaction, is highly important to lemurs and is frequently used in communication. Lemurs have long snouts (compared to the short snouts of haplorrhines) that are traditionally thought to position the nose for better sifting of smells, although long snouts do not necessarily translate into high olfactory acuity since it is not the relative size of the nasal cavity that correlates with smell, but the density of olfactory receptors. Instead, the long snouts may facilitate better chewing.

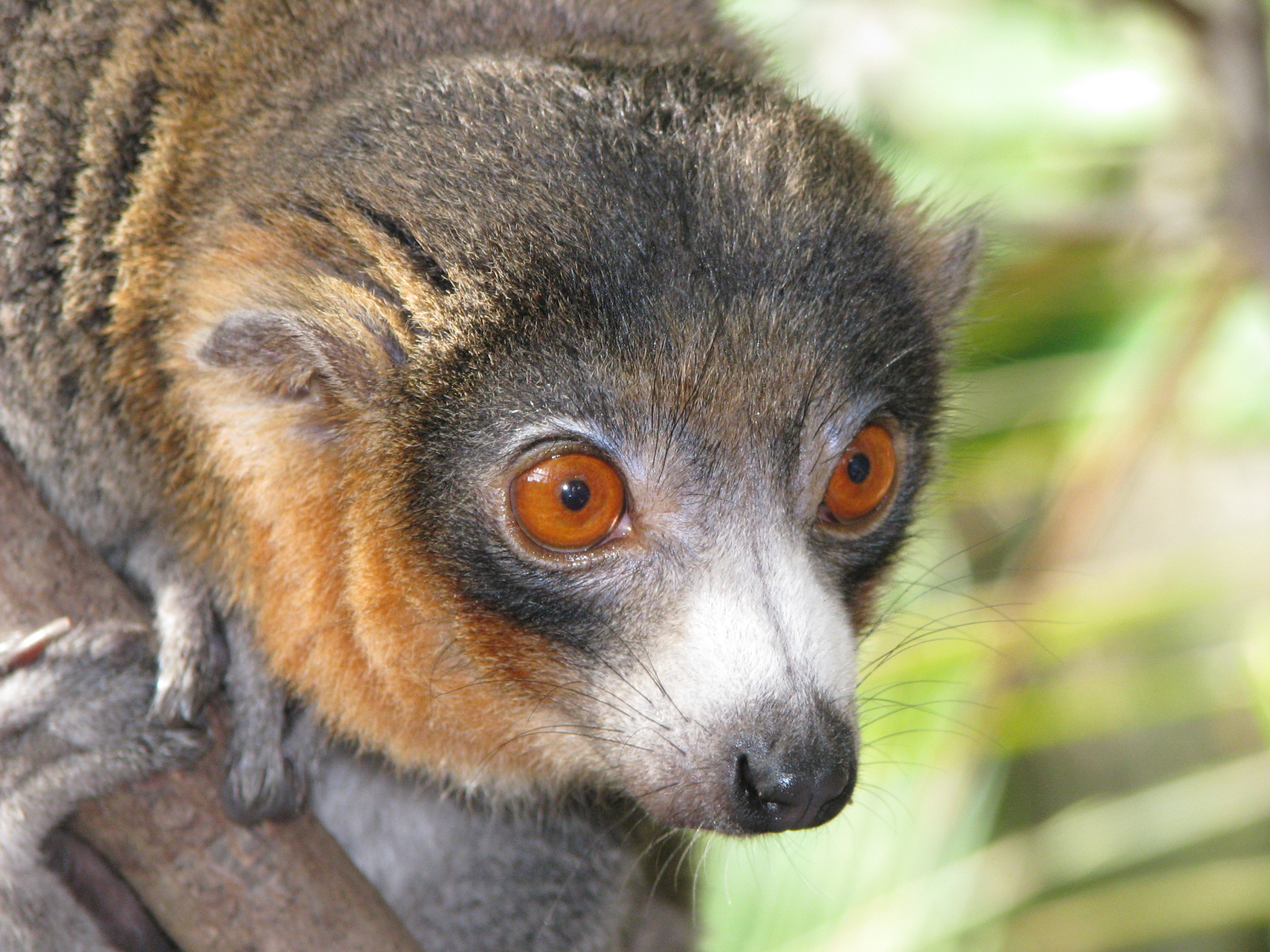
Lemurs generally have a wet nose, or rhinarium, as well as a longer snout than anthropoid primates.

The wet nose, or rhinarium, is a trait shared with other strepsirrhines and many other mammals, but not with haplorrhine primates. Although it is claimed to enhance the sense of smell, it is actually a touch-based sense organ that connects with a well-developed vomeronasal organ (VNO). Since pheromones are usually large, non-volatile molecules, the rhinarium is used to touch a scent-marked object and transfer the pheromone molecules down the philtrum (the nasal mid-line cleft) to the VNO via the nasopalatine ducts that travel through the incisive foramen of the hard palate.

To communicate with smell, which is useful at night, lemurs will scent mark with urine as well as scent glands located on the wrists, inside elbow, genital regions, or the neck. The scrotal skin of most male lemurs has scent glands. Ruffed lemurs (genus Varecia) and male sifakas have a gland at the base of their neck, while the greater bamboo lemur (Prolemur simus) and the ring-tailed lemur have glands inside the upper arms near the axilla. Male ring-tailed lemurs also have scent glands on the inside of their forearms, adjacent to a thornlike spur, which they use to gouge, and simultaneously, scent-mark tree branches. They will also wipe their tails between their forearms and then engage in "stink fights" by waving their tail at their opponents.

Lemurs (and strepsirrhines in general) are considered to be less visually oriented than the higher primates, since they rely so heavily on their sense of smell and pheromone detection. The fovea on the retina, which yields higher visual acuity, is not well-developed. The postorbital septum (or bony closure behind the eye) in haplorrhine primates is thought to stabilize the eye slightly, allowing for the evolution of the fovea. With only a postorbital bar, lemurs have been unable to develop a fovea. Therefore, regardless of their activity pattern (nocturnal, cathemeral, or diurnal), lemurs exhibit low visual acuity and high retinal summation. Lemurs can see a wider visual field, however, than anthropoid primates due to a slight difference in the angle between the eyes, as shown in the following table:

Optical angles and visual fields
	Angle between eyes	Binocular field	Combined field (binocular + periphery)
Lemurs	10–15°	114–130°	250–280°
Anthropoid primates	0°	140–160°	180–190°

Although they lack a fovea, some diurnal lemurs have a cone-rich, although less clustered, area centralis. This area centralis has a high rod-to-cone cell ratio in many diurnal species studied thus far, whereas diurnal anthropoids have no rod cells in their fovea. Once again, this suggests lower visual acuity in lemurs than in anthropoids. Furthermore, the rod-to-cone cell ratio can be variable even among diurnal species. For instance, Verreaux's sifaka (Propithecus verreauxi) and the indri (Indri indri) have only a few large cones scattered along their predominantly rod-dominated retina. The eyes of the ring-tailed lemur contain one cone to five rods. Nocturnal lemurs such as mouse lemurs and dwarf lemurs, on the other hand, have retinas made up entirely of rod cells.

Since cone cells make color vision possible, the high prevalence of rod cells in lemur eyes suggest they have not evolved color vision. The most studied lemur, the ring-tailed lemur, has been shown to have blue-yellow vision, but lacks the ability to distinguish red and green hues. Due to polymorphism in opsin genes, which code for color receptivity, trichromatic vision may rarely occur in females of a few lemur species, such as Coquerel's sifaka (Propithecus coquereli) and the red ruffed lemur (Varecia rubra). Most lemurs, therefore, are either monochromats or dichromats.

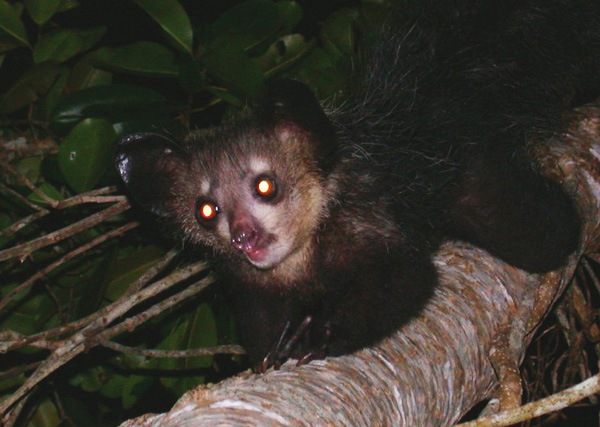
Aye-ayes exhibit eyeshine because they have a reflective layer of tissue in the eye, called a tapetum lucidum.

Most lemurs have retained the tapetum lucidum, a reflective layer of tissue in the eye, which is found in many vertebrates. This trait is absent in haplorrhine primates, and its presence further limits the visual acuity in lemurs. The strepsirrhine choroidal tapetum is unique among mammals because it is made up of crystalline riboflavin, and the resulting optical scattering is what limits visual acuity. Although the tapetum is considered to be ubiquitous in lemurs, there appear to be exceptions among true lemurs, such as the black lemur and the common brown lemur, as well as the ruffed lemurs. Since the riboflavins in the tapetum have a tendency to dissolve and vanish when processed for histological investigation, however, the exceptions are still debatable.

Lemurs also have a third eyelid known as a nictitating membrane, whereas most other primates have a lesser developed plica semilunaris. The nictitating membrane keeps the cornea moist and clean by sweeping across the eye.

=== Metabolism ===
Lemurs have low basal metabolic rates (BMR), which helps them to conserve energy during the dry season, when water and food are scarce. They can optimize their energy use by lowering their metabolic rate to 20% below the values predicted for mammals of similar body mass. The red-tailed sportive lemur (Lepilemur ruficaudatus), for instance, reportedly has one of the lowest metabolic rates among mammals. Its low metabolic rate may be linked to its generally folivorous diet and relatively small body mass. Lemurs exhibit behavioral adaptations to complement this trait, including sunning behaviors, hunched sitting, group huddling, and nest sharing, in order to reduce heat loss and conserve energy. Dwarf lemurs and mouse lemurs exhibit seasonal cycles of dormancy to conserve energy. Before dry season, they will accumulate fat in white adipose tissue located at the base of the tail and hind legs, doubling their weight. At the end of the dry season, their body mass may fall to half of what it was prior to the dry season. Lemurs that do not experience states of dormancy are also able to shut down aspects of their metabolism for energy conservation.

== Behaviour ==
Lemur behaviour is as variable as lemur morphology. Differences in diet, social systems, activity patterns, locomotion, communication, predator avoidance tactics, breeding systems, and intelligence levels help define lemur taxa and set individual species apart from the rest. Although trends frequently distinguish the smaller, nocturnal lemurs from the larger, diurnal lemurs, there are often exceptions that help exemplify the unique and diverse nature of these Malagasy primates.

=== Diet ===
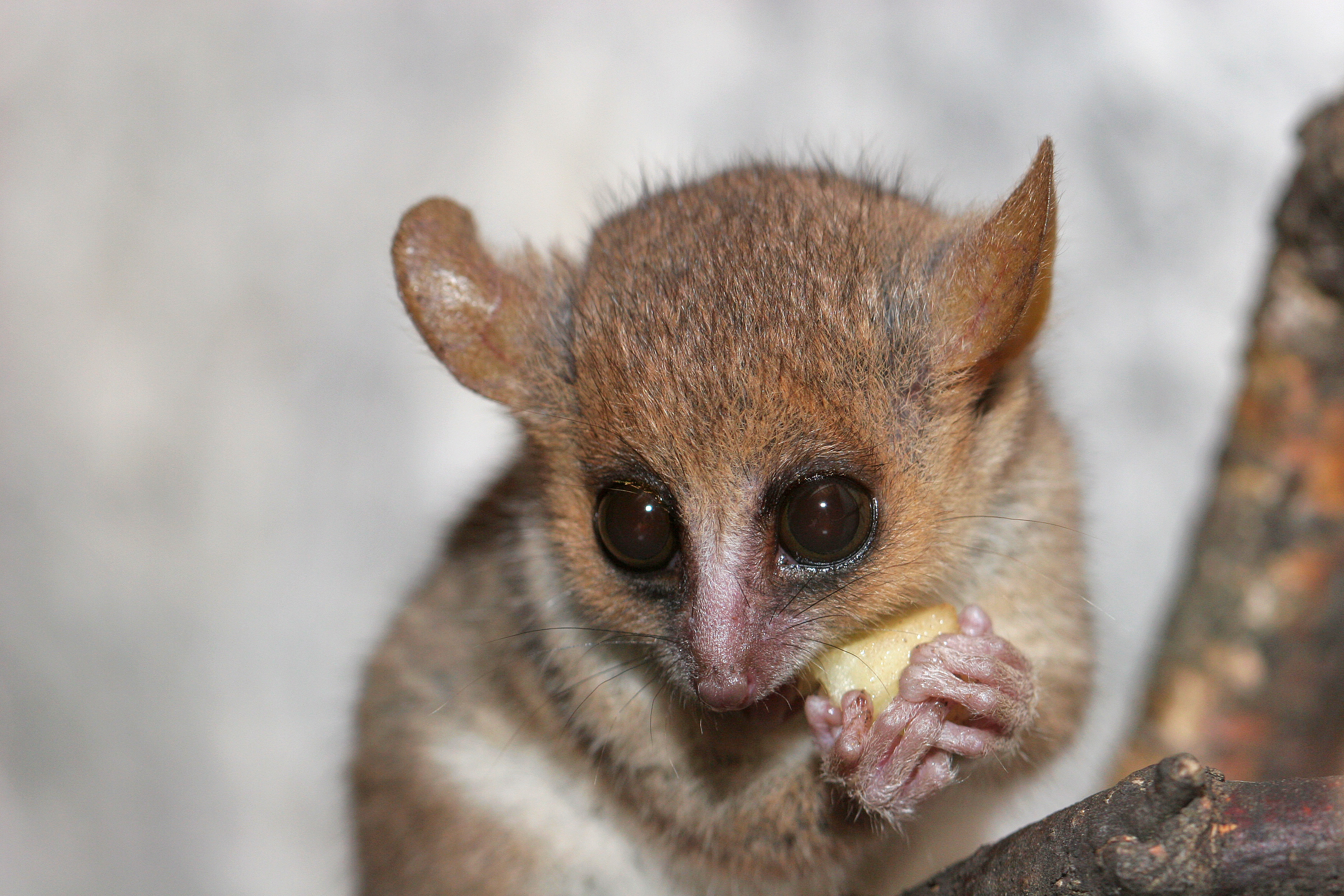
Mouse lemurs primarily eat fruit, although their diet also includes insects.

Lemur diets are highly variable and demonstrate a high degree of plasticity, although general trends suggest that the smallest species primarily consume fruit and insects (omnivory), while the larger species are more herbivorous, consuming mostly plant material. As with all primates, hungry lemurs might eat anything that is edible, whether or not the item is one of their preferred foods. For instance, the ring-tailed lemur eats insects and small vertebrates when necessary and as a result it is commonly viewed as an opportunistic omnivore. Coquerel's giant mouse lemur (Mirza coquereli) is mostly frugivorous, but will consume insect secretions during the dry season.

A common assumption in mammalogy is that small mammals cannot subsist entirely on plant material and must have a high-calorie diet in order to survive. As a result, it was thought that the diet of tiny primates must be high in protein-containing insects (insectivory). Research has shown, however, that mouse lemurs, the smallest living primates, consume more fruit than insects, contradicting the popular hypothesis.

Plant material makes up the majority of most lemur diets. Members of at least 109 of all known plant families in Madagascar (55%) are exploited by lemurs. Since lemurs are primarily arboreal, most of these exploited species are woody plants, including trees, shrubs, or lianas. Only the ring-tailed lemur, the bamboo lemurs (genus Hapalemur), and the black-and-white ruffed lemur (Varecia variegata) are known to consume herbs. While Madagascar is rich in fern diversity, these plants are rarely eaten by lemurs. One possible reason for this is that ferns lack flowers, fruits, and seeds—common food items in lemur diets. They also occur close to the ground, while lemurs spend most of their time in the trees. Lastly, ferns have an unpleasant taste due to the high content of tannins in their fronds. Likewise, mangroves appear to be rarely exploited by lemurs due to their high tannin content. Some lemurs appear to have evolved responses against common plant defenses, however, such as tannins and alkaloids. The golden bamboo lemur (Hapalemur aureus), for instance, eats giant bamboo (Cathariostachys madagascariensis), which contains high levels of cyanide. This lemur can consume twelve times the typically lethal dose for most mammals on a daily basis; the physiological mechanisms that protect it from cyanide poisoning are unknown. At the Duke Lemur Center (DLC) in the United States, lemurs that roam the outdoor enclosures have been observed eating poison ivy (Taxicodendron radicans), yet have shown no ill effects.

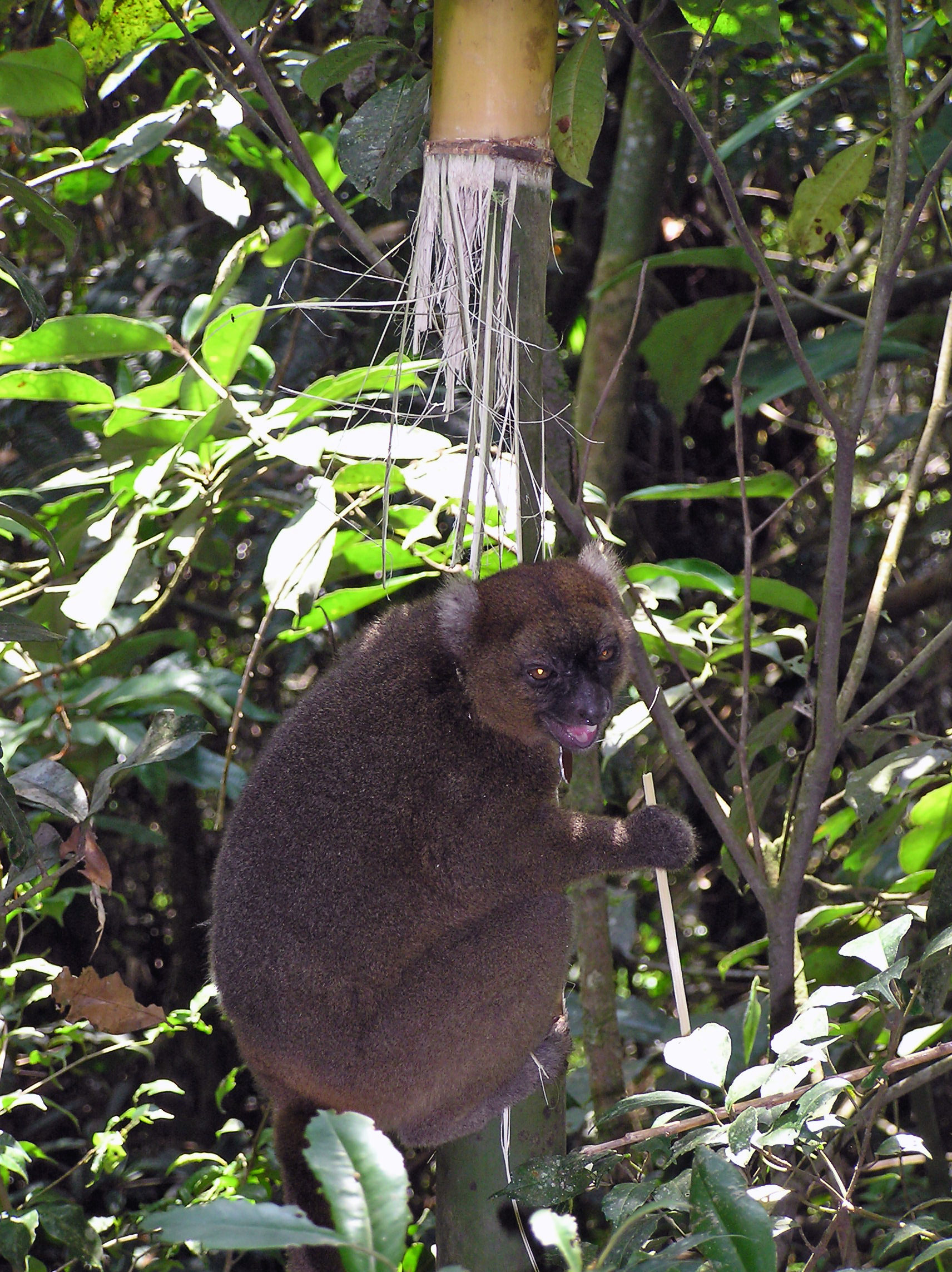
Up to 95% of the greater bamboo lemur's diet consists of bamboo.

Many of the larger lemur species consume leaves (folivory), particularly the indriids. However, some smaller lemurs such as sportive lemurs (genus Lepilemur) and woolly lemurs (genus Avahi) also primarily eat leaves, making them the smallest primates that do so. The smallest of the lemurs generally do not eat much leaf matter. Collectively, lemurs have been documented consuming leaves from at least 82 native plant families and 15 alien plant families. Lemurs tend to be selective in their consumption of the part of the leaf or shoot as well as its age. Often, young leaves are preferred over mature leaves.

Many lemurs that eat leaves tend to do so during times of fruit scarcity, sometimes suffering weight loss as a result. Most lemur species, including most of the smallest lemurs and excluding some of the indriids, predominantly eat fruit (frugivory) when available. Collectively, lemurs have been documented consuming fruit from at least 86 native plant families and 15 alien plant families. As with most tropical fruit eaters, the lemur diet is dominated by fruit from Ficus (fig) species. In many anthropoid primates, fruit is a primary source of vitamin C, but unlike anthropoid primates, lemurs (and all strepsirrhines) can synthesize their own vitamin C. Historically, captive lemur diets high in vitamin C-rich fruits have been thought to cause hemosiderosis, a type of iron overload disorder, since vitamin C increases iron absorption. Although lemurs in captivity have been shown to be prone to hemosiderosis, the frequency of the disease varies across institutions and may depend on the diet, husbandry protocols, and genetic stock. Assumptions about the problem need to be tested separately for each species. The ring-tailed lemur, for instance, seems to be less prone to the disorder than other lemur species.

Only eight species of lemur are known to be seed predators (granivores), but this may be under-reported since most observations only report fruit consumption and do not investigate whether the seeds are consumed as well. These lemurs include some indriids, such as the diademed sifaka (Propithecus diadema), the golden-crowned sifaka (Propithecus tattersalli), the indri, and the aye-aye. The aye-aye, which specializes in structurally defended resources, can chew through Canarium seeds, which are harder than the seeds that New World monkeys are known to break open. At least 36 genera from 23 families of plants are targeted by lemur seed predators.

Inflorescences (clusters of flowers) of at least 60 plant families are eaten by lemurs ranging in size from the tiny mouse lemurs to the relatively large ruffed lemurs. If the flowers are not exploited, sometimes the nectar is consumed (nectarivory) along with the pollen (palynivory). At least 24 native species from 17 plant families are targeted for nectar or pollen consumption.

Bark and plant exudates such as tree sap are consumed by a few lemur species. The exploitation of exudates has been reported in 18 plant species and only in the dry regions in the south and west of Madagascar. Only the Masoala fork-marked lemur (Phaner furcifer) and Coquerel's giant mouse lemur regularly consume tree sap. Bark has never been reported as an important food item in lemur diets, but at least four species eat it: the aye-aye, the red-tailed sportive lemur (Lepilemur ruficaudatus), the common brown lemur (Eulemur fulvus), and Verreaux's sifaka (Propithecus verreauxi). Most bark feeding is directly linked to exudate feeding, except for the aye-aye's bark feeding on Afzelia bijuga (genus Afzelia) at Nosy Mangabe in the northeast.

Soil consumption (geophagy) has also been reported and likely helps with digestion, provides minerals and salts, and helps absorb toxins. Sifakas have been observed eating soil from termite mounds, possibly adding beneficial intestinal flora to aid the digestion of cellulose from their folivorous diet.

=== Social systems ===
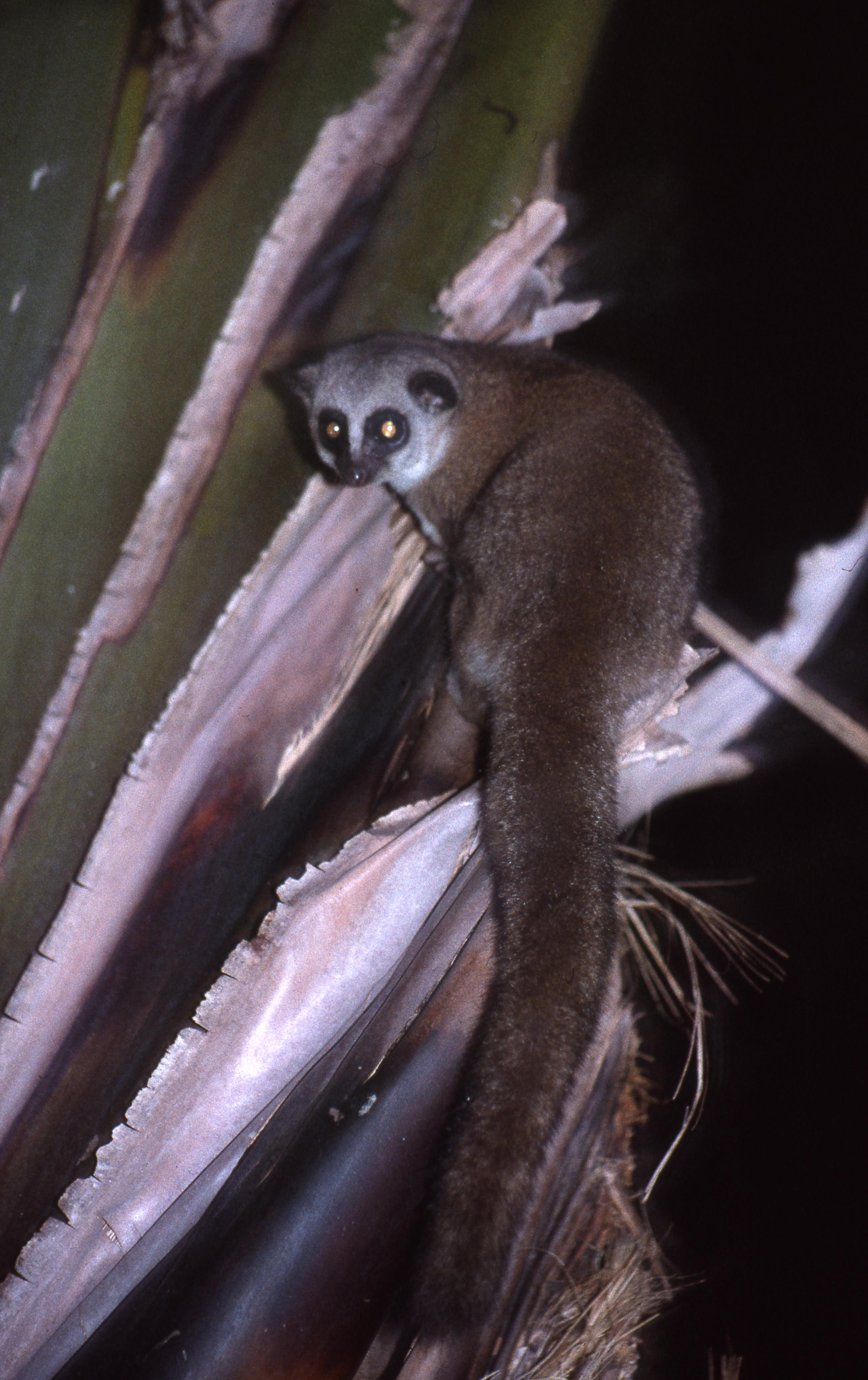
Dwarf lemurs are solitary but social, foraging alone but often sleeping in groups.

Lemurs are social and live in groups that usually include fewer than 15 individuals. Observed social organization patterns include "solitary but social", "fission-fusion", "pair bonds", and "multi-male group". Nocturnal lemurs are mostly solitary but social, foraging alone at night but often nesting in groups during the day. The degree of socialization varies by species, gender, location, and season. In many nocturnal species, for instance, the females, along with their young, will share nests with other females and possibly one male, whose larger home range happens to overlap one or more female nesting groups. In sportive lemurs and fork-marked lemurs, one or two females may share a home range, possibly with a male. In addition to sharing nests, they will also interact vocally or physically with their range-mate while they forage at night. Diurnal lemurs exhibit many of the social systems seen in monkeys and apes, living in relatively permanent and cohesive social groups. Multi-male groups are the most common, just as they are in most anthropoid primates. True lemurs utilize this social system, often living in groups of ten or less. Ruffed lemurs have been shown to live in fission-fusion societies, and Indri forms pair bonds.

Some lemurs exhibit female philopatry, where females stay within their natal range and the males migrate upon reaching maturity, and in other species both sexes will migrate. In some cases, female philopatry may help explain the evolution of female-bonded multi-male groups, such as those of the ring-tailed lemur, Milne-Edwards' sifaka (Propithecus edwardsi), and the Verreaux's sifaka. Their ancestors may have been more solitary, with females that lived in mother-daughter pairs (or dyads). Over time, these dyads may have allied themselves with other neighboring mother-daughter dyads in order to defend more distributed resources in a wide home range. If this is true, then multi-male groups in lemurs may differ fundamentally in their internal structure from those in catarrhine primates (Old World monkeys and apes).

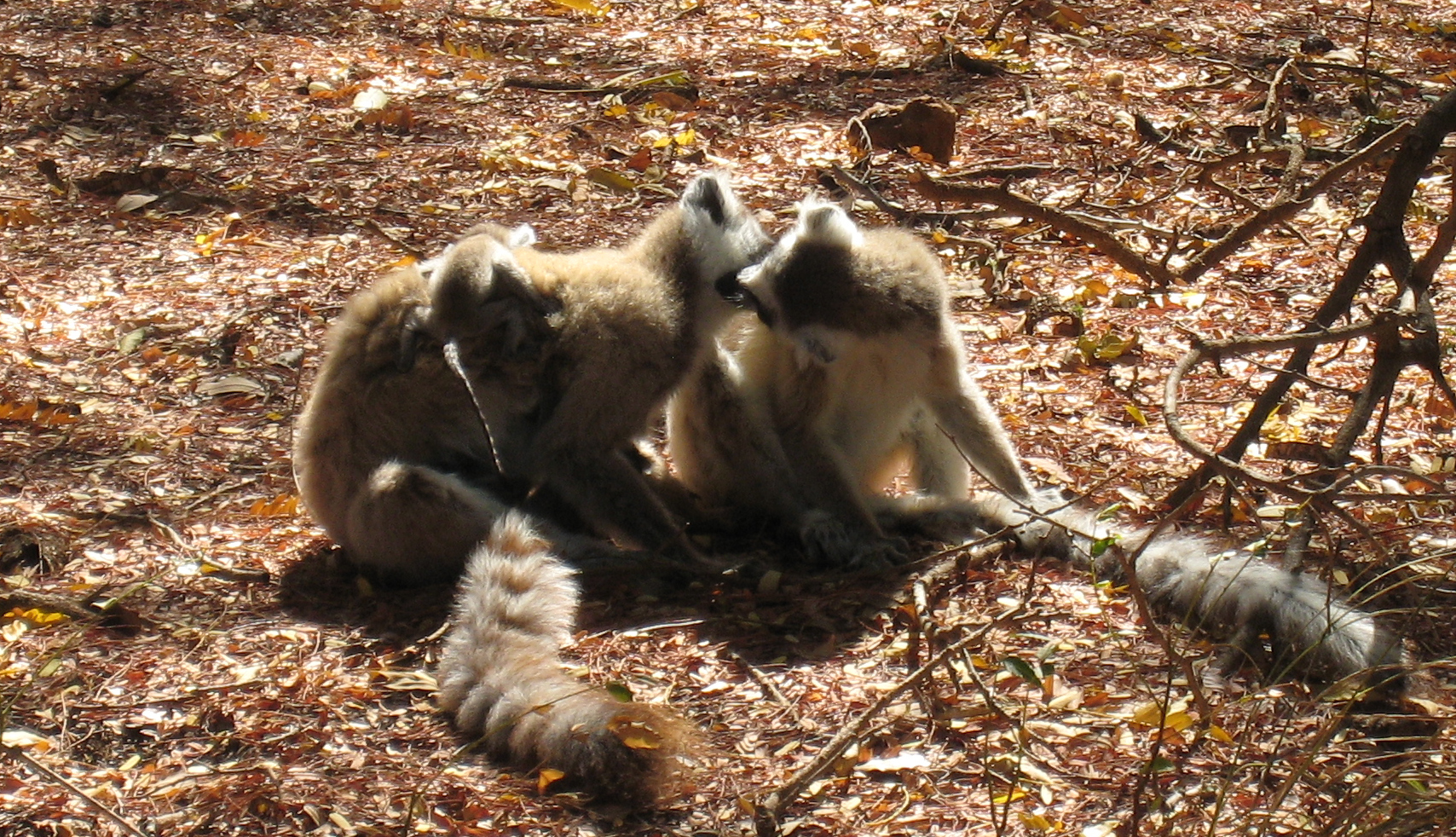
Social grooming serves many functions for social lemurs.

The presence of female social dominance sets lemurs apart from most other primates and mammals; in most primate societies, males are dominant unless females band together to form coalitions that displace them. However, many Eulemur species are exceptions and the greater bamboo lemur does not exhibit female dominance. When females are dominant within a group, the way they maintain dominance varies. Ring-tailed lemur males act submissively with or without signs of female aggression. Male crowned lemurs (Eulemur coronatus), on the other hand, will only act submissively when females act aggressively towards them. Female aggression is often associated with, but not limited to, feeding.

There have been many hypotheses that have attempted to explain why lemurs exhibit female social dominance while other primates with similar social structures do not, but no consensus has been reached after decades of research. The dominant view in the literature states that female dominance is an advantageous trait given the high costs of reproduction and the scarcity of resources available. Indeed, female dominance has been shown to be linked to increased maternal investment. However, when reproductive costs and extreme seasonality of resources were compared across primates, other primates demonstrated male dominance under conditions that were similar to or more challenging than those faced by lemurs. In 2008, a new hypothesis revised this model using simple game theory. It was argued that when two individuals were equally matched in fighting capacity, the one with the most need would win the conflict since it would have the most to lose. Consequently, the female, with higher resource needs for pregnancy, lactation, and maternal care, was more likely to win in resource conflicts with equally sized males. This, however, assumed monomorphism between sexes. The following year, a new hypothesis was proposed to explain monomorphism, stating that because most female lemurs are only sexually receptive for a day or two each year, males can utilize a more passive form of mate guarding: copulatory plugs, which block the female reproductive tract, preventing other males from successfully mating with her, and thus reducing the need for aggression and the evolutionary drive for sexual dimorphism.

In general, levels of agonism (or aggression) tend to correlate with relative canine height. The ring-tailed lemur has long, sharp upper canine teeth in both sexes, and it also exhibits high levels of agonism. The Indri, on the other hand, has smaller canines and exhibits lower levels of aggression. When neighboring groups of the same species defend their territories, the conflict can take the form of ritualized defense. In sifakas, these ritualized combats involve staring, growling, scent-marking, and leaping to occupy certain sections of the tree. The indri defends its home range with ritualized "singing" battles.

Like other primates, lemurs groom socially (allogroom) to ease tensions and solidify relationships. They groom in greeting, when waking up, when settling in for sleep, between mother and infant, in juvenile relations, and for sexual advances. Unlike anthropoid primates, who part the fur with the hands and pick out particles with the fingers or mouth, lemurs groom with their tongue and scraping with their toothcomb. Despite the differences in technique, lemurs groom with the same frequency and for the same reasons as anthropoids.

=== Activity patterns ===
The biological rhythm can vary from nocturnal in smaller lemurs to diurnal in most larger lemurs. Diurnality is not seen in any other living strepsirrhine. Cathemerality, where an animal is active sporadically both day and night, occurs among some of the larger lemurs. Few if any other primates exhibit this sort of activity cycle, either regularly or irregularly under changing environmental conditions. The most heavily studied cathemeral lemurs are the true lemurs. Although the mongoose lemur (E. mongoz) is the best-documented example, every species in the genus studied has shown some degree of cathemeral behavior, although night activity is often restricted by light availability and moon periodicity. This type of behavior was first documented in the 1960s in true lemur species as well as other Lemuridae species, such as ruffed lemurs and bamboo lemurs. Initially described as "crepuscular" (active at dawn and dusk), anthropologist Ian Tattersall stimulated additional research and coined the new term "cathemeral", although many non-anthropologists prefer the terms "circadian" or "diel".

In order to conserve energy and water in their highly seasonal environment, mouse lemurs and dwarf lemurs exhibit seasonal behavioral cycles of dormancy where the metabolic rate and body temperature are lowered. They are the only primates known to do so. They accumulate fat reserves in their hind legs and the base of their tail before the dry winter season, when food and water are scarce, and can exhibit daily and prolonged torpor during the dry season. Daily torpor constitutes less than 24 hours of dormancy, whereas prolonged torpor averages two weeks in duration and signals hibernation. Mouse lemurs have been observed experiencing torpor that lasts for several consecutive days, but dwarf lemurs are known to hibernate for six to eight months every year, particularly on the west coast of Madagascar.

Dwarf lemurs are the only primates known to hibernate for extended periods. Unlike other hibernating mammals from temperate regions, which have to awaken regularly for a few days, dwarf lemurs experience five months of continuous deep hibernation (May through September). Before and after this deep hibernation, there are two months (April and October) of transition, where they will forage on a limited basis to reduce demands on their fat reserves. Unlike any other hibernating mammal, the body temperature of hibernating dwarf lemurs will fluctuate with the ambient temperature rather than remaining low and stable.

Other lemurs that do not exhibit dormancy conserve energy by selecting thermoregulated microhabitats (such as tree holes), sharing nests, and reducing exposed body surfaces, such as by hunched sitting and group huddling. Also, the ring-tailed lemur, ruffed lemurs, and sifakas are commonly seen sunning, thus using solar radiation to warm their bodies instead of metabolic heat.

=== Locomotion ===
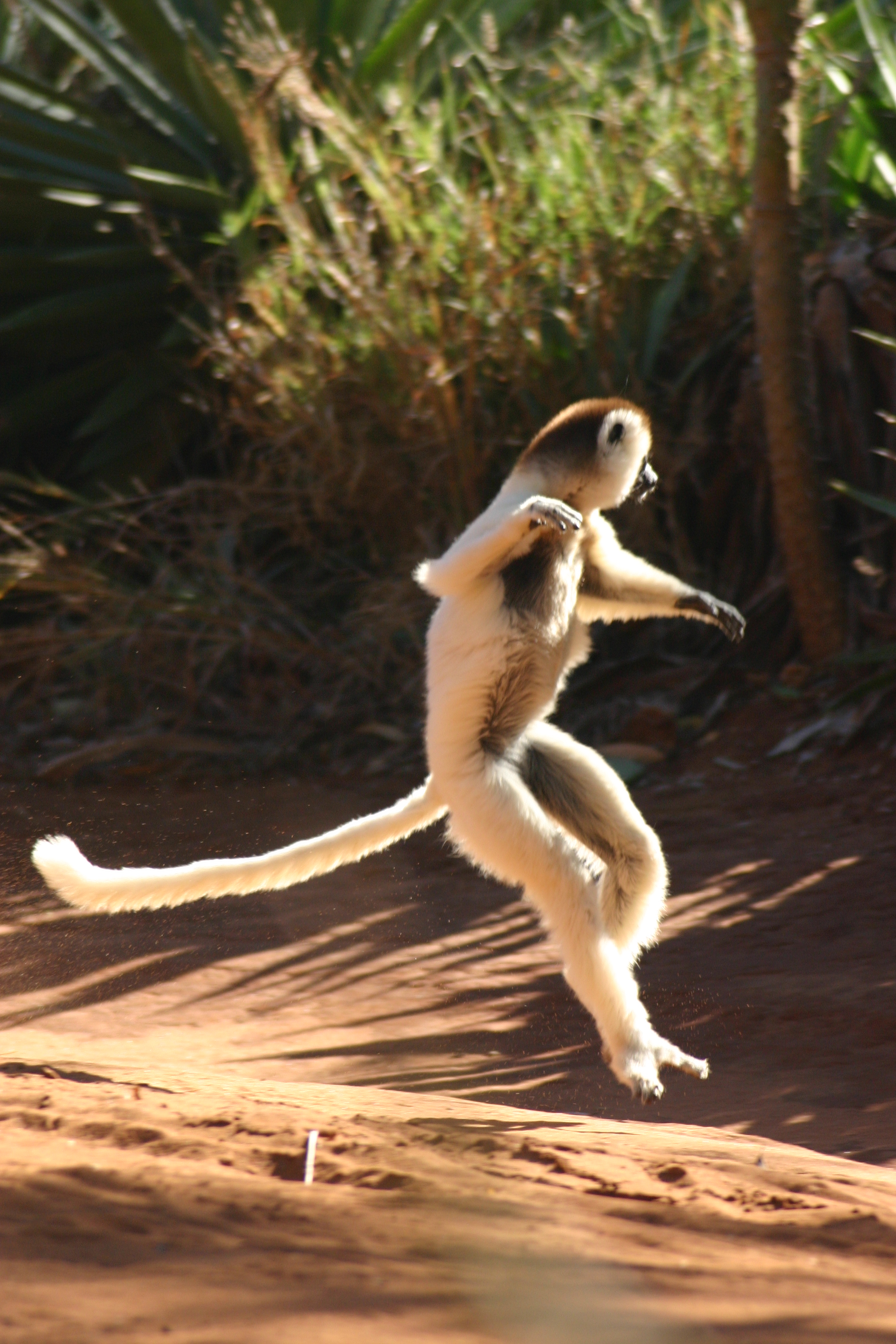
Sifakas are specially adapted to vertical clinging and leaping, so they must hop sideways to move on the ground.

Locomotor behavior in lemurs, both living and extinct, is highly varied and its diversity exceeds that of anthropoids. Locomotor postures and behaviors have included vertical clinging and leaping (including saltatory behavior), seen in indriids and bamboo lemurs; slow (loris-like) arboreal quadrupedal locomotion, once exhibited by Mesopropithecus; fast arboreal quadrupedal locomotion, seen in true lemurs and ruffed lemurs; partially terrestrial quadrupedal locomotion, seen in the ring-tailed lemur; highly terrestrial quadrupedal locomotion, once exhibited by monkey lemurs such as Hadropithecus; and sloth-like suspensory locomotion, once exhibited by many of the sloth lemurs, such as Palaeopropithecus. The Lac Alaotra gentle lemur (Hapalemur alaotrensis) has even been reported to be a good swimmer. Sometimes these locomotor types are lumped together into two main groups of lemurs, the vertical clingers and leapers and the arboreal (and occasionally terrestrial) quadrupeds.

The jumping prowess of the indriids has been well documented and is popular among ecotourists visiting Madagascar. Using their long, powerful back legs, they catapult themselves into the air and land in an upright posture on a nearby tree, with both hands and feet tightly gripping the trunk. Indriids can leap up to 10 m (33 ft) rapidly from tree trunk to tree trunk, an ability referred to as "ricochetal leaping". Verreaux's sifaka (Propithecus verreauxi) manages to do this in the spiny forests of southern Madagascar. It is unknown how it avoids impaling its palms on the thorn-covered trunks of large plants such as Alluaudia. When distances between trees are too great, sifakas will descend to the ground and cross distances more than 100 m (330 ft) by standing upright and hopping sideways with the arms held to the side and waving up and down from chest to head height, presumably for balance. This is sometimes described as a "dance-hop".

=== Communication ===
Lemur communication can be transmitted through sound, sight, and smell (olfaction). The ring-tailed lemur, for instance, uses complex though highly stereotyped behaviors such as scent-marking and vocalizations. Visual signals are probably the least used by lemurs, since they lack many of the muscles used in common primate facial expressions. Given their poor vision, whole-body postures are probably more noticeable. However, the ring-tailed lemur has demonstrated distinct facial expressions including a threat stare, pulled back lips for submission, and pulled back ears along with flared nostrils during scent-marking. This species has also been observed using yawns as threats. Their ringed tails also communicate distance, warn off neighboring troops, and help locate troop members. Sifakas are known to exhibit an open-mouth play face as well as a submissive teeth-baring grimace used in agonistic interactions.

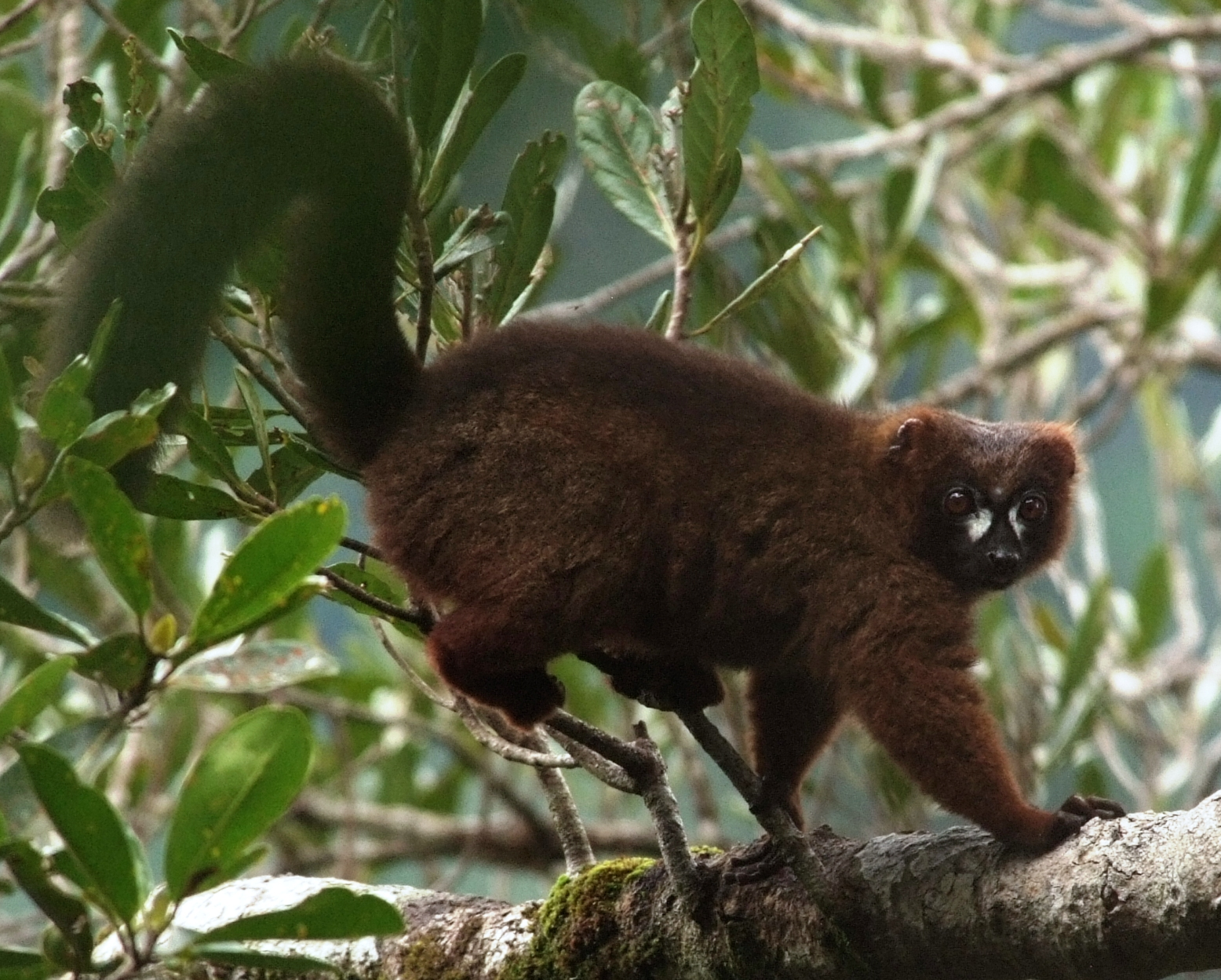
Lemurs use scent-marking to communicate. Pictured is a red-bellied lemur rubbing its rump against some smaller branches.

Olfaction is particularly important to lemurs, except for the indri, which lacks most common lemur scent glands and has a greatly reduced olfactory region in the brain. Olfaction can communicate information about age, sex, reproductive status, as well as demarcate the boundaries of a territory. It is most useful for communication between animals that rarely encounter each other. Small, nocturnal lemurs mark their territories with urine, while the larger, diurnal species use scent glands located on various parts of their anatomy. The ring-tailed lemur engages in "stink fights" by rubbing its tail across scent glands on its wrists and then flicking it at other male opponents. Some lemurs defecate in specific areas, otherwise known as latrine behavior. Although many animals exhibit this behavior, it is a rare trait among primates. Latrine behavior can represent territorial marking and aid in interspecies signaling.

Compared to other mammals, primates in general are very vocal, and lemurs are no exception. Some lemur species have extensive vocal repertoires, including the ring-tailed lemur and ruffed lemurs. Some of the most common calls among lemurs are predator alarm calls. Lemurs not only respond to alarm calls of their own species, but also alarm calls of other species and those of non-predatory birds. The ring-tailed lemur and a few other species have different calls and reactions to specific types of predators. With mating calls, it has been shown that mouse lemurs that cannot be discerned visually respond more strongly to the calls of their own species, particularly when exposed to the calls of other mouse lemurs that they would encounter normally within their home range. Lemur calls can also be very loud and carry long distances. Ruffed lemurs use several loud calls that can be heard up to 1 km (0.62 mi) away on a clear, calm day. The loudest lemur is the indri, whose calls can be heard up to 2 km (1.2 mi) or more and thus communicate more effectively the territorial boundaries over its 34 to 40 hectares (0.13 to 0.15 sq mi) home range. Both ruffed lemurs and the indri exhibit contagious calling, where one individual or group starts a loud call and others within the area join in. The song of the indri can last 45 seconds to more than 3 minutes and tends to coordinate to form a stable duet comparable to that of gibbons.

Tactile communication (touch) is mostly used by lemurs in the form of grooming, although the ring-tailed lemur also clumps together to sleep (in an order determined by rank), reaches out and touches adjacent members, and cuffs other members. Reaching out and touching another individual in this species has been shown to be a submissive behavior, done by younger or submissive animals towards older and more dominant members of the troop. Allogrooming, however, appears to occur more frequently between higher ranking individuals, a shared trait with other primate species. Unlike anthropoid primates, lemur grooming seems to be more intimate and mutual, often directly reciprocated. Anthropoids, on the other hand, use allogrooming to manage agonistic interactions. The ring-tailed lemur is known to be very tactile, spending between 5 and 11% of its time grooming.

Sample lemur vocalizations

Indri duet
The wailing "song" of the indri

Gray mouse lemur alarm call
High-frequency, fast-paced squeaks emitted when startled

Ring-tailed lemur cackle
A defensive but confrontational vocalization

Ruffed lemur roar/shriek chorus
An intergroup spacing call

=== Predator avoidance ===
Lemur alarm calls
Three types of clicks followed by loud yaps
Mammalian predator alert by a ring-tailed lemur

High-amplitude, pulsed squawks
Mammalian predator alert by a ruffed lemur

All lemurs experience some predation pressure. Common defenses against predation include the use of alarm calls and predator mobbing, mostly among diurnal lemurs. The leaping abilities of lemurs may have evolved for predator avoidance rather than for travel, according to a study in kinematics. Nocturnal lemurs are difficult to see and track at night and decrease their visibility by foraging alone. They also try to avoid predators by using concealing sleeping locations, such as nests, tree holes, or dense vegetation, Some may also avoid areas frequented by predators by detecting the smell of their feces and alternating between multiple sleeping locations. Even torpor and hibernation states among cheirogaleids may be partly due to high levels of predation. Infants are protected while foraging by either leaving them in the nest or by stashing them in a hidden location, where the infant remains immobile in the absence of the parent.

Diurnal lemurs are visible during the day, so many live in groups, where increased numbers aid predator detection. Diurnal lemurs use and respond to alarm calls, even those of other lemur species and non-predatory birds. The ring-tailed lemur has different calls and reactions to different classes of predators, such as predatory birds, mammals, or snakes. Some lemurs, such as the indri, use crypsis to camouflage themselves. They are often heard but difficult to see in the trees due to the dappled light, earning them the reputation of being "ghosts of the forest".

=== Reproduction ===
Except for the aye-aye and the Lac Alaotra gentle lemur, lemurs are seasonal breeders with very short mating and birth seasons influenced by the highly seasonal availability of resources in their environment. Mating season usually last less than three weeks each year, and the female vagina opens up only during a few hours or days of her most receptive time of estrus. These narrow windows for reproduction and resource availability appear to relate to their short gestation periods, rapid maturation, and low basal metabolic rates, as well as the high energy costs of reproduction for females. This may also relate to the relatively high mortality rate among adult females and the higher proportion of adult males in some lemur populations—both unusual traits among primates. In both the aye-aye and Lac Alaotra gentle lemur, birth (parturition) occurs over a six-month period.

Lemurs time their mating and birth seasons so that all weaning periods are synchronized to match the time of highest food availability. Weaning occurs either before or shortly after the eruption of the first permanent molars in lemurs. Mouse lemurs are able to fit their entire breeding cycle into the wet season, whereas larger lemurs, such as sifakas, must lactate for two months during the dry season. Infant survival in some species, such as Milne-Edwards' sifaka, has been shown to be directly impacted by both environmental conditions and the rank, age, and health of the mother. The breeding season is also affected by geographical location. For example, mouse lemurs give birth between September and October in their native habitat in the Southern Hemisphere, but from May through June in the captive settings in the Northern Hemisphere.

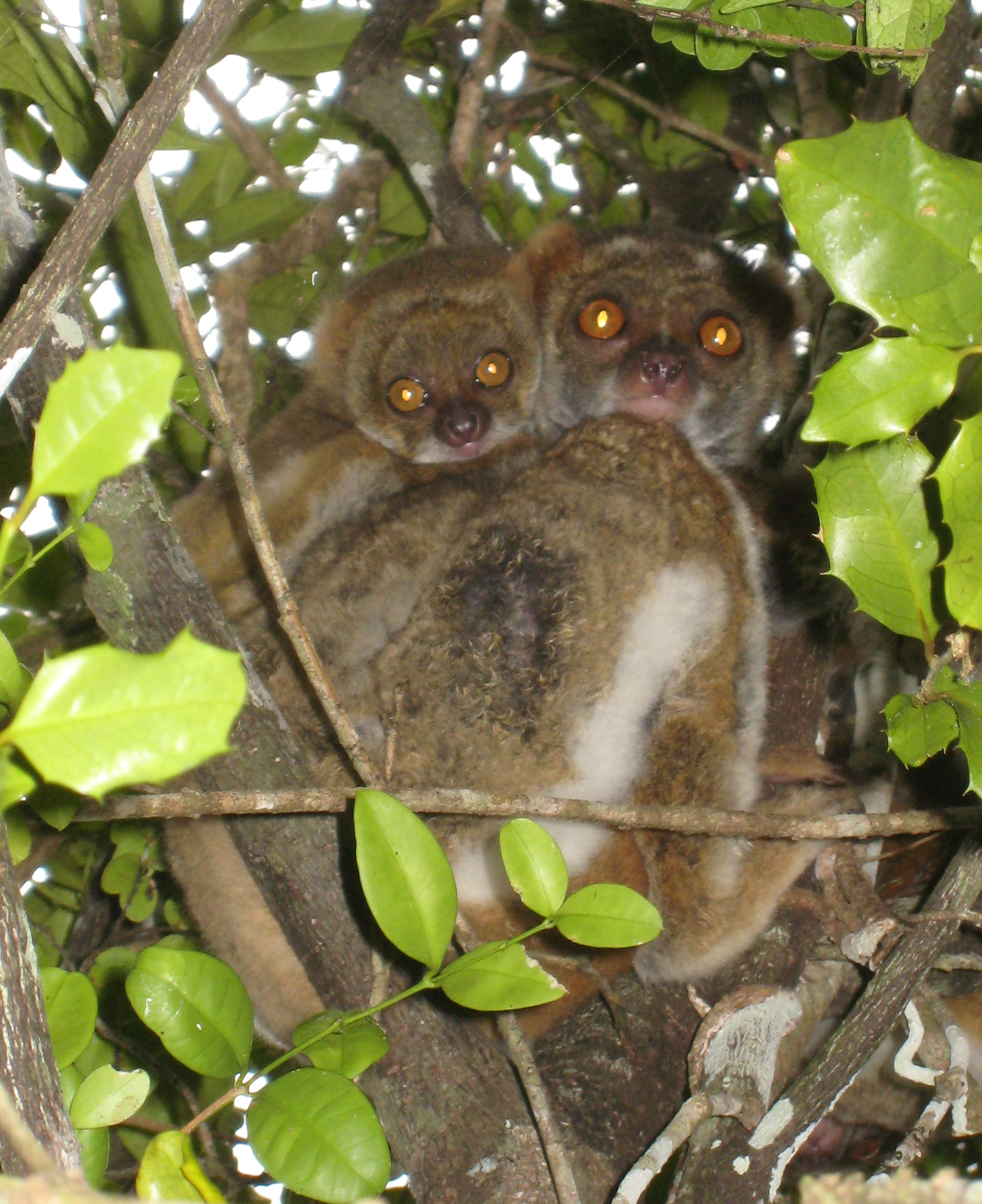
Woolly lemurs are nocturnal and typically give birth to one offspring, which they carry with them while foraging.

Scent factors heavily into lemur reproduction. Scent-marking activity escalates during the mating season. Pheromones may coordinate reproductive timing for females coming into estrus. Mating can be either monogamous or promiscuous for both males and females, and mating can include individuals from outside the group. Monogamous lemurs include the red-bellied lemur (Eulemur rubriventer) and the mongoose lemur (E. mongoz), although the mongoose lemur has been observed mating outside of its pair bond. Monogamy is most common among nocturnal species, although some exhibit scramble competition, sexual suppression of subordinates, or competitions between males that avoid direct fighting. In mouse lemurs, males utilize sperm plugs, developed enlarged testes during the mating season, and develop size dimorphism (likely due to the enlarged testes). These indicate a mating system known as scramble competition polygyny, where males cannot defend females or the resources that might attract them.

The gestation period varies within lemurs, ranging from 9 weeks in mouse lemurs and 9–10 weeks in dwarf lemurs to 18–24 weeks in other lemurs. The smaller, nocturnal lemurs, such as mouse lemurs, giant mouse lemurs, and dwarf lemurs, usually give birth to more than one infant, whereas the larger, nocturnal lemurs, such as fork-marked lemurs, sportive lemurs, and the aye-aye usually have one offspring. Dwarf and mouse lemurs have up to four offspring, but both average only two. Ruffed lemurs are the only large, diurnal lemurs to consistently give birth to two or three offspring. All other lemurs have single births. Multiple births in lemurs are normally fraternal, and are known to occur in every five to six births in species such as the ring-tailed lemur and some Eulemur.

After the offspring are born, lemurs either carry them around or stash them while foraging. When transported, the infants either cling to the mother's fur or are carried in the mouth by the scruff. In some species, such as bamboo lemurs, infants are carried by mouth until they are able to cling to their mother's fur. Species that park their offspring include nocturnal species (e.g. mouse lemurs, sportive lemurs, and dwarf lemurs), bamboo lemurs, and ruffed lemurs. In the case of the ruffed lemurs, the young are altricial and the mothers build nests for them, much like the smaller, nocturnal lemur species. Woolly lemurs are unusual for nocturnal lemurs because they live in cohesive family groups and carry their single offspring with them rather than parking them. Alloparenting (multiple or group parenting) has been reported in all lemur families except the sportive lemurs and aye-aye. Allonursing is also known to occur in several lemur groups. Even males have been observed caring for infants in species such as the red-bellied lemur, mongoose lemur, eastern lesser bamboo lemur, silky sifaka, fat-tailed dwarf lemur, and ruffed lemurs.

Yet another trait that sets most lemurs apart from anthropoid primates is their long lifespan together with their high infant mortality. Many lemurs, including the ring-tailed lemur, have adapted to a highly seasonal environment, which has affected their birthrate, maturation, and twinning rate (r-selection). This helps them to recover rapidly from a population crash. In captivity, lemurs can live twice as long as they do in the wild, benefiting from consistent nutrition that meets their dietary requirements, medical advancements, and improved understanding of their housing requirements. In 1960, it was thought that lemurs could live between 23 and 25 years. It is now known that the larger species can live for more than 30 years without showing signs of aging (senescence) and still be capable of reproduction.

=== Cognitive abilities and tool use ===
Lemurs have traditionally been regarded as being less intelligent than anthropoid primates, with monkeys and apes often described as having more cunning, guile, and deceptiveness. Many lemur species, such as sifakas and the ring-tailed lemur, have scored lower on tests designed for monkeys while performing as well as monkeys on other tests. These comparisons may not be fair since lemurs prefer to manipulate objects with their mouths (rather than their hands) and only take interest in objects when in captivity. Recent studies have shown that lemurs exhibit levels of technical intelligence on par with many other primates, although they manipulate objects less often. Tool use has not been witnessed by lemurs in the wild, although in captivity the common brown lemur and the ring-tailed lemur have been demonstrated to be able to understand and use tools.

A few lemurs have been noted to have relatively large brains. The extinct Hadropithecus was as large as a large male baboon and had a comparably sized brain, giving it the largest brain size relative to body size among all prosimians. The aye-aye also has a large brain-to-body ratio, which may indicate a higher level of intelligence. However, despite having a built-in tool in the form of its thin, elongated middle finger, which it uses to fish for insect grubs, the aye-aye has tested poorly in the use of extraneous tools.

== Ecology ==
See above: Diet, Metabolism, Activity patterns, and Locomotion

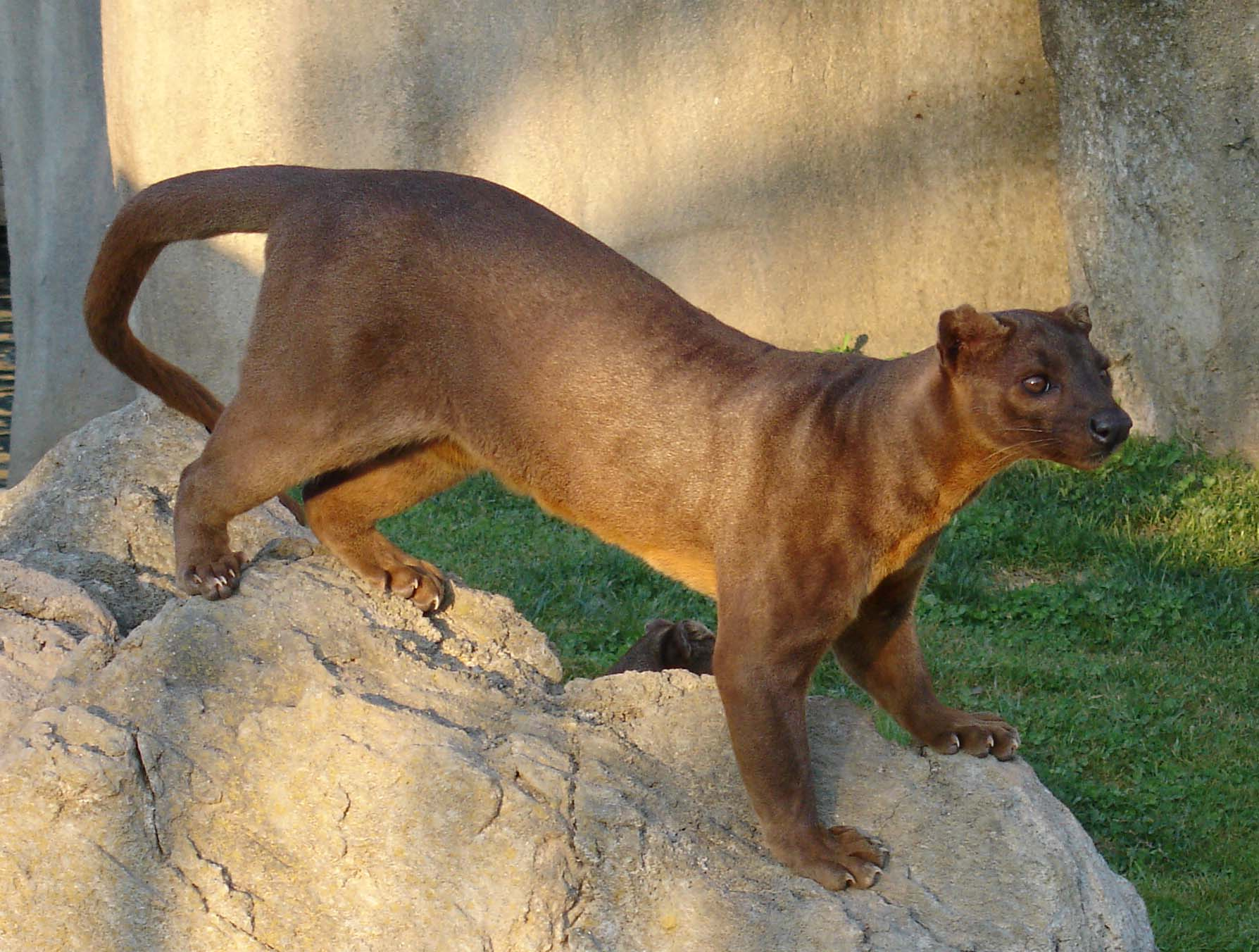

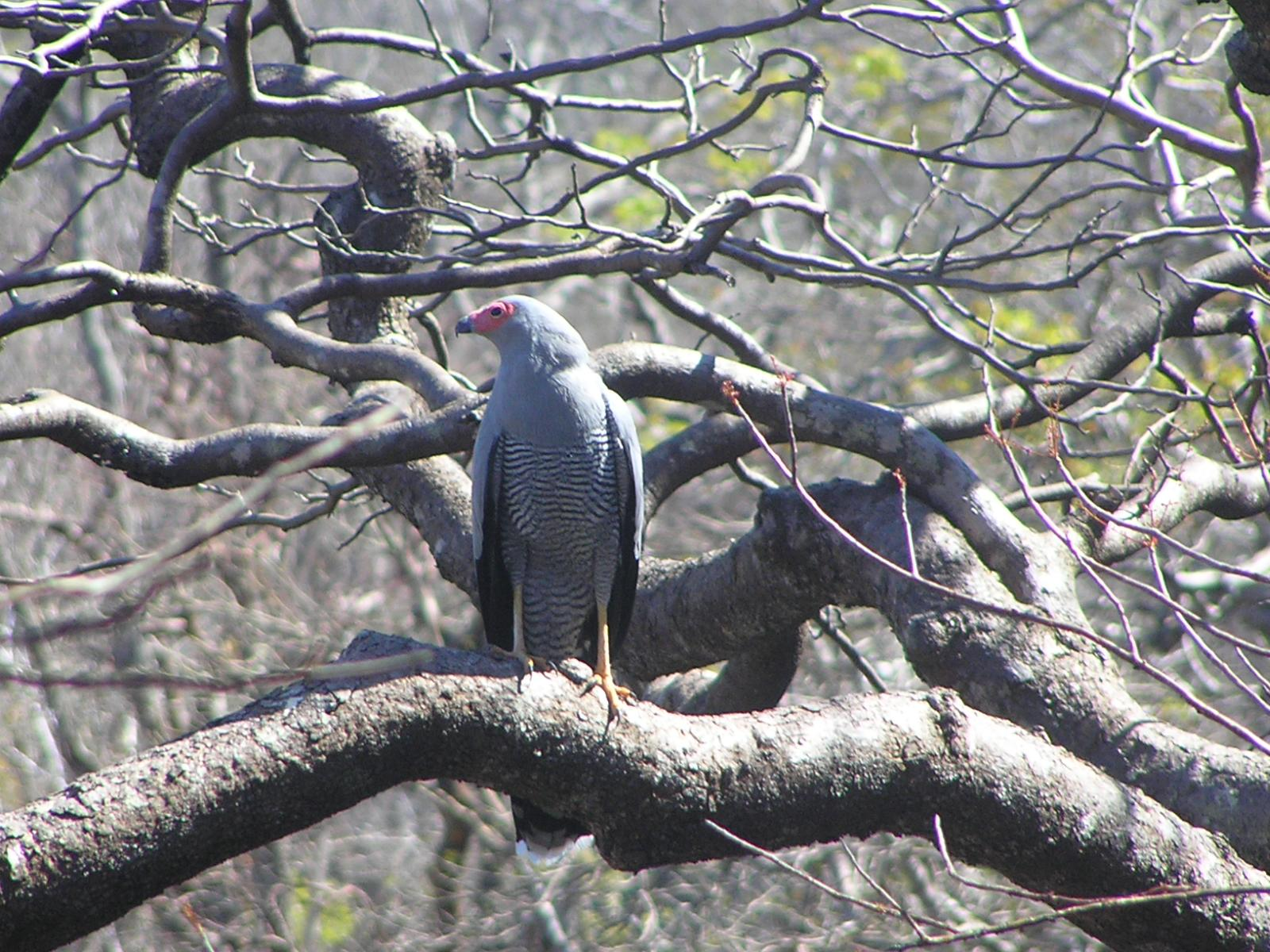
The fossa (above) and the Madagascar harrier-hawk (below) are predators of many lemur species.

Madagascar not only contains two radically different climatic zones, the rainforests of the east and the dry regions of the west, but also swings from extended drought to cyclone-generated floods. These climatic and geographical challenges, along with poor soils, low plant productivity, wide ranges of ecosystem complexity, and a lack of regularly fruiting trees (such as fig trees) have driven the evolution of lemurs' immense morphological and behavioral diversity. Their survival has required the ability to endure the persistent extremes, not yearly averages.

Lemurs have either presently or formerly filled the ecological niches normally occupied by monkeys, squirrels, woodpeckers, and grazing ungulates. With the diversity of adaptations for specific ecological niches, habitat selection among lemur families and some genera is often very specific, thus minimizing competition. In nocturnal lemurs from the more seasonal forests in the west, up to five species can coexist during the wet season due to high food abundance. However, to endure the extreme dry season, three of the five species utilize different dietary patterns and their underlying physiological traits to allow them to coexist: fork-marked lemurs feed on tree gum, sportive lemurs feed on leaves, and giant mouse lemurs sometimes feed on insect secretions. The other two species, the gray mouse lemur and the fat-tailed dwarf lemur (Cheirogaleus medius), avoid competition through reduced activity. The gray mouse lemur uses bouts of torpor, while the fat-tailed dwarf lemur hibernates completely. Similarly, on the east coast entire genera focus on specific food to avoid too much niche overlap. True lemurs and ruffed lemurs are frugivorous, indriids are folivorous, and bamboo lemurs specialize in bamboo and other grasses. Once again, seasonal dietary differences as well as subtle differences in substrate preferences, forest strata used, activity cycle, and social organization enable lemur species to coexist, although this time the species are more closely related and have similar niches. A classic example involves resource partitioning between three species of bamboo lemur that live in close proximity in small forested areas: the golden bamboo lemur, the greater bamboo lemur, and the eastern lesser bamboo lemur (Hapalemur griseus). Each utilizes either different species of bamboo, different parts of the plant, or different layers in the forest. Nutrient and toxin content (such as cyanide) help regulate food selection, though seasonal food preferences are also known to play a role.

Dietary regimes of lemurs include folivory, frugivory, and omnivory, with some being highly adaptable while others specialize on foods such as plant exudates (tree gum) and bamboo. In some cases, lemur feeding patterns directly benefit the native plant life. When lemurs exploit nectar, they may act as pollinators as long as the functional parts of the flower are not damaged. In fact, several unrelated Malagasy flowering plants demonstrate lemur-specific pollination traits, and studies indicate that some diurnal species, such as the red-bellied lemur and the ruffed lemurs, act as major pollinators. Two examples of plant species that rely on lemurs for pollination include traveller's palm (Ravenala madagascariensis) and a species of legume-like liana, Strongylodon cravieniae. Seed dispersal is another service lemurs provide. After passing through the lemur gut, tree and vine seeds exhibit lower mortality and germinate faster. Latrine behavior exhibited by some lemurs may help improve soil quality and facilitate seed dispersal. Because of their importance in maintaining a healthy forest, frugivorous lemurs may qualify as keystone mutualists.

All lemurs, particularly the smaller species, are affected by predation and they are important prey items for predators. Humans are the most significant predator of diurnal lemurs, despite taboos that occasionally forbid the hunting and eating of certain lemur species. Other predators include native euplerids, such as the fossa, feral cats, domestic dogs, snakes, diurnal birds of prey, and crocodiles. Extinct giant eagles, including one or two species from the genus Aquila and the giant Malagasy crowned eagle (Stephanoaetus mahery), as well as the giant fossa (Cryptoprocta spelea), previously also preyed on lemurs, perhaps including the giant subfossil lemurs or their subadult offspring. The existence of these extinct giants suggests that predator-prey interactions involving lemurs were more complex than they are today. Today, predator size restricts owls to the smaller lemurs, usually 100 g (3.5 oz) or less, while the larger lemurs fall victim to the larger diurnal birds of prey, such as the Madagascar harrier-hawk (Polyboroides radiatus) and the Madagascar buzzard (Buteo brachypterus).

== Research ==
Similarities that lemurs share with anthropoid primates, such as diet and social organization, along with their own unique traits, have made lemurs the most heavily studied of all mammal groups on Madagascar. Research often focuses on the link between ecology and social organization, but also on their behavior and morphophysiology (the study of anatomy in relation to function). Studies of their life-history traits, behavior and ecology help understanding of primate evolution, since they are thought to share similarities with ancestral primates.

Lemurs have been the focus of monographic series, action plans, field guides, and classic works in ethology. However, few species have been thoroughly studied to date, and most research has been preliminary and restricted to a single locality. Only recently have numerous scientific papers been published to explain the basic aspects of behavior and ecology of poorly known species. Field studies have given insights on population dynamics and evolutionary ecology of most genera and many species. Long-term research focused on identified individuals is in its infancy and has only been started for a few populations. However, learning opportunities are dwindling as habitat destruction and other factors threaten the existence of lemur populations across the island.

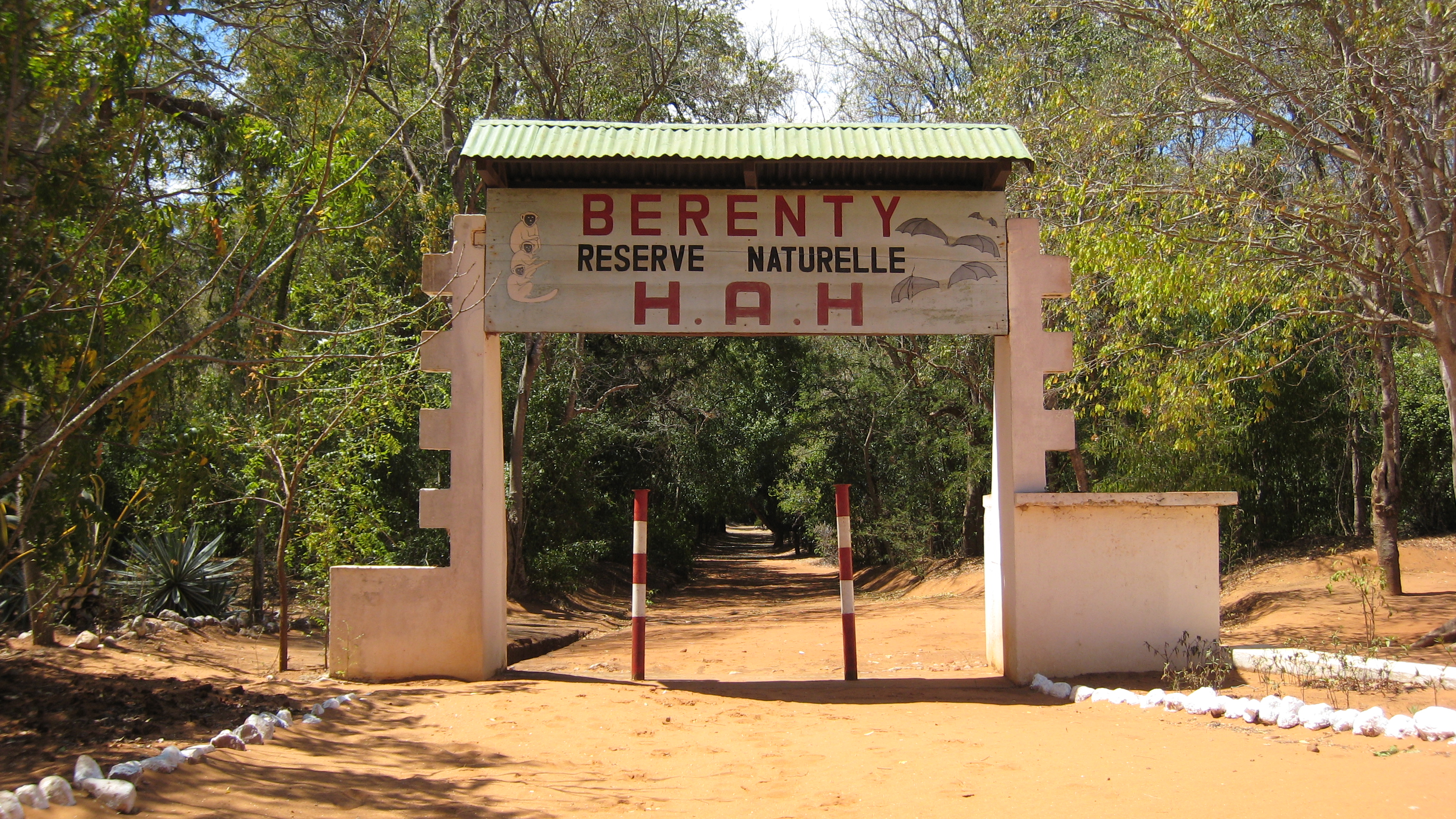
Berenty Private Reserve in southern Madagascar is both a popular tourist destination and research location. Alison Jolly began her research here in 1962.

Lemurs are mentioned in sailors' voyage logs as far back as 1608 and in 1658 that at least seven lemur species were described in detail by the French merchant, Étienne de Flacourt, who may also have been the only westerner to see and chronicle the existence of a giant (now extinct) lemur, which he called the tretretretre. Around 1703 merchants and sailors began bringing lemurs back to Europe, at which time James Petiver, an apothecary in London, described and illustrated the mongoose lemur. Starting in 1751, the London illustrator George Edwards began describing and illustrating some lemur species, of which a few were included in various editions of Systema Naturae by Carl Linnaeus. In the 1760s and 1770s, French naturalists Georges-Louis Leclerc, Comte de Buffon and Louis-Jean-Marie Daubenton began describing the anatomy of several lemur species. The first traveling naturalist to comment on lemurs was Philibert Commerçon in 1771, although it was Pierre Sonnerat who recorded a greater variety of lemur species during his travels.

During the 19th century, there was an explosion of new lemur descriptions and names, which later took decades to sort out. During this time, professional collectors gathered specimens for museums, menageries, and cabinets. Some of the major collectors were Johann Maria Hildebrandt and Charles Immanuel Forsyth Major. From these collections, as well as increasing observations of lemurs in their natural habitats, museum systematists including Albert Günther and John Edward Gray continued to contribute new names for new lemur species. However, the most notable contributions from this century includes the work of Alfred Grandidier, a naturalist and explorer who devoted himself to the study of Madagascar's natural history and local people. With the help of Alphonse Milne-Edwards, most of the diurnal lemurs were illustrated at this time. However, lemur taxonomic nomenclature took its modern form in the 1920s and 1930s, being standardized by Ernst Schwarz in 1931.

Although lemur taxonomy had developed, it was not until the 1950s and 1960s that the in-situ (or on-site) study of lemur behavior and ecology began to blossom. Jean-Jacques Petter and Arlette Petter-Rousseaux toured Madagascar in 1956 and 1957, surveying many of its lemur species and making important observations about their social groupings and reproduction. In 1960, the year of Madagascar's independence, David Attenborough introduced lemurs to the West with a commercial film. Under the guidance of John Buettner-Janusch, who founded the Duke Lemur Center in 1966, Alison Jolly traveled to Madagascar in 1962 to study the diet and social behavior of the ring-tailed lemur and Verreaux's sifaka at Berenty Private Reserve. The Petters and Jolly spawned a new era of interest in lemur ecology and behavior and were shortly followed by anthropologists such as Alison Richard, Robert Sussman, Ian Tattersall, and many others. Following the political turmoil of the mid-1970s and Madagascar's revolution, field studies resumed in the 1980s, thanks in part to the renewed involvement of the Duke Lemur Center under the direction of Elwyn L. Simons and the conservation efforts of Patricia Wright. In the decades that followed, huge strides have been made in lemur studies and many new species have been discovered.

Ex situ research (or off-site research) is also popular among researchers looking to answer questions that are difficult to test in the field. For example, efforts to sequence the genome of the gray mouse lemur will help researchers understand which genetic traits set primates apart from other mammals and will ultimately help understand what genomic traits set humans apart from other primates. One of the foremost lemur research facilities is the Duke Lemur Center (DLC) in Durham, North Carolina. It maintains the largest captive lemur population outside of Madagascar, which it maintains for non-invasive research and captive breeding. Many important research projects have been carried out there, including studies of lemur vocalizations, basic locomotor research, the kinematics of bipedalism, the effects of social complexity transitive reasoning, and cognition studies involving a lemur's ability to organize and retrieve sequences from memory. Other facilities, such as the Lemur Conservation Foundation, located near Myakka City, Florida, have also hosted research projects, such as one that looked at lemurs' ability to preferentially select tools based on functional qualities.

== Conservation ==
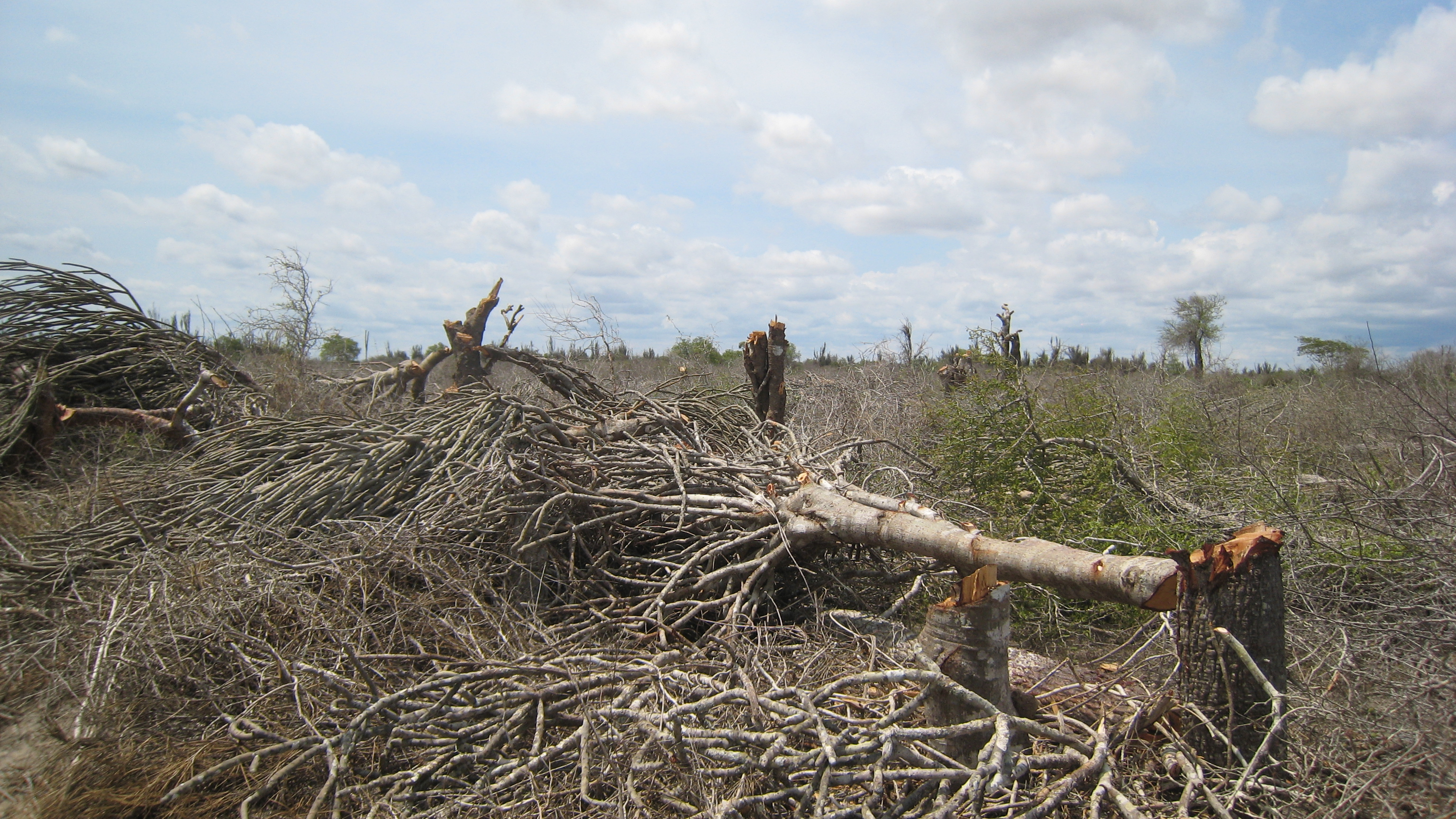

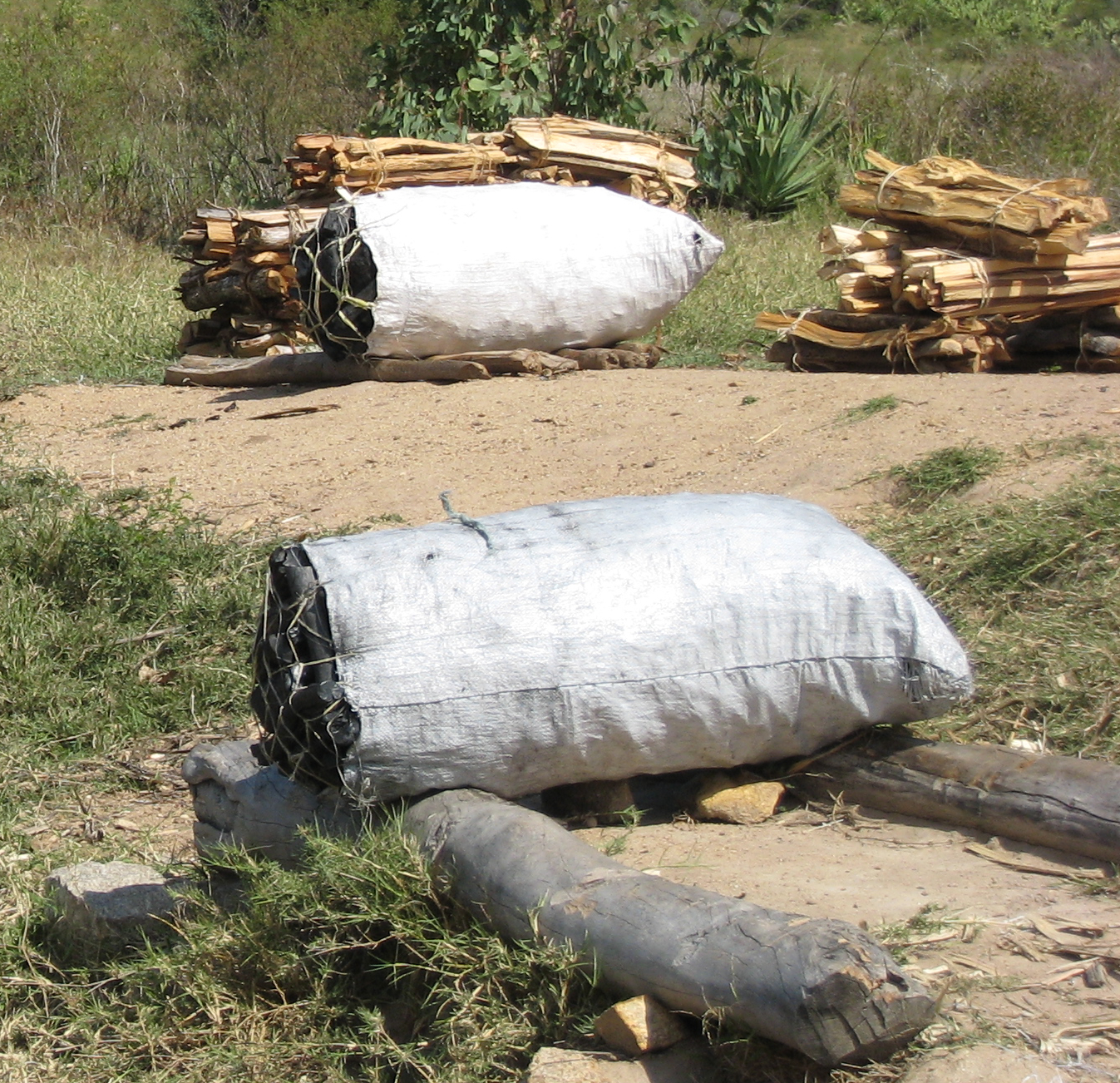
Lemurs in the spiny forests of Madagascar are threatened by deforestation for the creation of farmland and pasture (above) as well as firewood and charcoal production (below) for cooking fuel.

Lemurs are threatened by a host of environmental problems, including deforestation, hunting for bushmeat, live capture for the exotic pet trade, and climate change. All species are listed by CITES on Appendix I, which prohibits trade of specimens or parts, except for scientific purposes. As of 2005, the International Union for Conservation of Nature (IUCN) listed 16% of all lemur species as critically endangered, 23% as endangered, 25% as vulnerable, 28% as "data deficient", and only 8% as least concern. Over the next five years, at least 28 species were newly identified, none of which have had their conservation status assessed. Many are likely to be considered threatened since the new lemur species that have been described recently are typically confined to small regions. Given the rate of continued habitat destruction, undiscovered species could go extinct before being identified.

More recently, the IUCN reported in 2025 that 98% of lemur species face extinction risk, with more than 30% classified as Critically Endangered. Since the arrival of humans on the island approximately 2000 years ago, all endemic Malagasy vertebrates over 10 kg (22 lb) have disappeared, including 17 species, 8 genera, and 3 families of lemurs. The IUCN Species Survival Commission (IUCN/SSC), the International Primatological Society (IPS), and Conservation International (CI) have included as many as five lemurs in their biennial "Top 25 Most Endangered Primates". The 2008–2010 list includes the greater bamboo lemur, gray-headed lemur (Eulemur cinereiceps), blue-eyed black lemur (Eulemur flavifrons), northern sportive lemur (Lepilemur septentrionalis), and silky sifaka. In 2012, an assessment by the Primate Specialist Group of the International Union for Conservation of Nature (IUCN) concluded that 90% of the then 103 described species of lemur should be listed as threatened on the IUCN Red List, making lemurs the most endangered group of mammals. The IUCN reiterated its concern in 2013, noting that 90% of all lemur species could be extinct within 20 to 25 years unless a US$7 million 3-year conservation plan aimed at helping local communities can be implemented.

Madagascar is one of the poorest countries in the world, with a high population growth rate of 2.5% per year and nearly 70% of the population living in poverty. The country is also burdened with high levels of debt and limited resources. These socioeconomic issues have complicated conservation efforts, even though the island of Madagascar has been recognized by IUCN/SSC as a critical primate region for over 20 years. Due to its relatively small land area—587,045 km^{2} (226,659 sq mi)—compared to other high-priority biodiversity regions and its high levels of endemism, the country is considered one of the world's most important biodiversity hotspots, with lemur conservation being a high priority. Despite the added emphasis for conservation, there is no indication that the extinctions that began with the arrival of humans have come to an end.

=== Threats in the wild ===
The greatest concern facing lemur populations is habitat destruction and degradation. Deforestation takes the form of local subsistence use, such as slash and burn agriculture (referred to as tavy in Malagasy), the creation of pasture for cattle through burning, and legal and illegal gathering of wood for firewood or charcoal production; commercial mining; and the illegal logging of precious hardwoods for foreign markets. After centuries of unsustainable use, as well as rapidly escalating forest destruction since 1950, less than 60,000 km^{2} (23,000 sq mi) or 10% of Madagascar's land area remains forested. Only 17,000 km^{2} (6,600 sq mi) or 3% of the island's land area is protected and due to dire economic conditions and political instability, most of the protected areas are ineffectively managed and defended. Some protected areas were set aside because they were naturally protected by their remote, isolated location, often on steep cliffs. Other areas, such as the dry forests and spiny forests of the west and south, receive little protection and are in serious danger of being destroyed.

Some species may be in risk of extinction even without complete deforestation, such as ruffed lemurs, which are very sensitive to habitat disturbance. If large fruit trees are removed, the forest may sustain fewer individuals of a species and their reproductive success may be affected for years. Small populations may be able to persist in isolated forest fragments for 20 to 40 years due to long generation times, but in the long term, such populations may not be viable. Small, isolated populations also risk extirpation by natural disasters and disease outbreaks (epizootics). Two diseases that are lethal to lemurs and could severely impact isolated lemur populations are toxoplasmosis, which is spread by feral cats, and the herpes simplex virus carried by humans.

Climate change and weather-related natural disasters also threaten lemur survival. For the last 1000 years, western and highland regions have been growing significantly drier, but in the past few decades, severe drought has become much more frequent. There are indications that deforestation and forest fragmentation are accelerating this gradual desiccation. The effects of drought are even felt in the rainforests. As annual rainfall decreases, the larger trees that make up the high canopy suffer increased mortality, failure to fruit, and decreased production of new leaves, which folivorous lemurs prefer. Cyclones can defoliate an area, knock down canopy trees, and create landslides and flooding. This can leave lemur populations without fruit or leaves until the following spring, requiring them to subsist on crisis foods, such as epiphytes.

Lemurs are hunted for food by the local Malagasy, either for local subsistence or to supply a luxury meat market in the larger cities. Most rural Malagasy do not understand what "endangered" means, nor do they know that hunting lemurs is illegal or that lemurs are found only in Madagascar. Many Malagasy have taboo, or fady, about hunting and eating lemurs, but this does not prevent hunting in many regions. Even though hunting has been a threat to lemur populations in the past, it has recently become a more serious threat as socioeconomic conditions deteriorate. Economic hardships have caused people to move around the country in search of employment, leading local traditions to break down. Drought and famine can also relax the fady that protect lemurs. Larger species, such as sifakas and ruffed lemurs, are common targets, but smaller species are also hunted or accidentally caught in snares intended for larger prey. Experienced, organized hunting parties using firearms, slings and blowguns can kill as many as eight to twenty lemurs in one trip. Organized hunting parties and lemur traps can be found in both non-protected areas and remote corners of protected areas. National parks and other protected areas are not adequately protected by law enforcement agencies. Often, there are too few park rangers to cover a large area, and sometimes terrain within the park is too rugged to check regularly.

Although not as significant as deforestation and hunting, some lemurs, such as crowned lemurs and other species that have successfully been kept in captivity, are occasionally kept as exotic pets by Malagasy people. Bamboo lemurs are also kept as pets, although they only survive for up to two months. Live capture for the exotic pet trade in wealthier countries is not normally considered a threat due to strict regulations controlling their export.

=== Conservation efforts ===
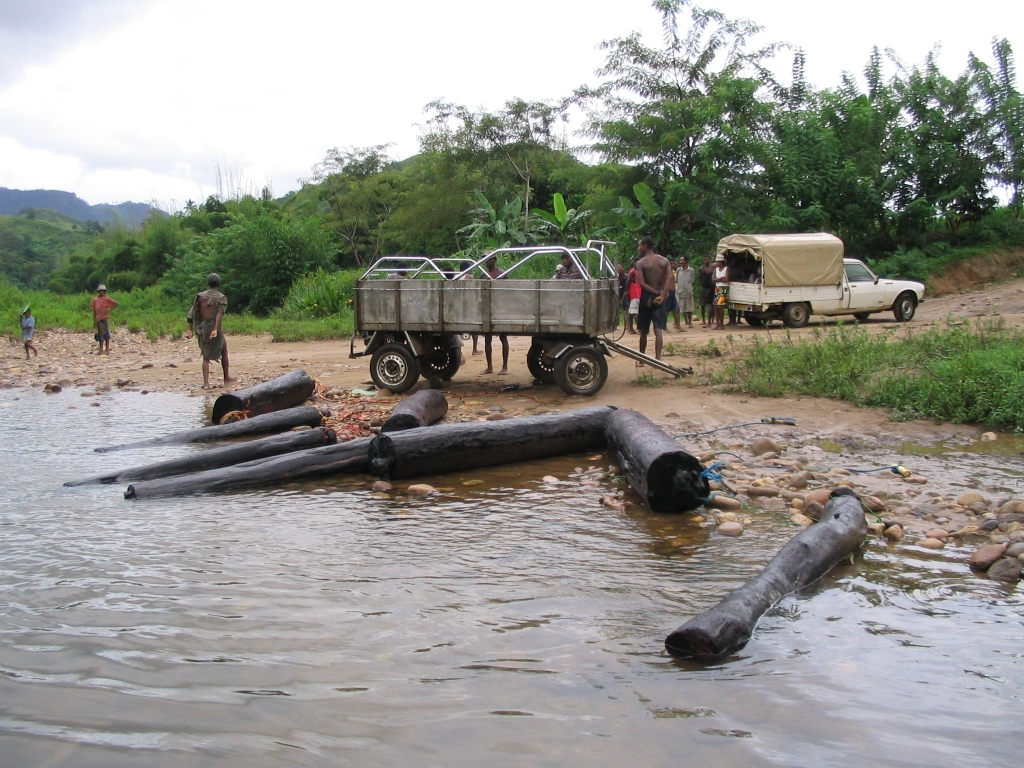
Rosewood is logged illegally from national parks, such as Marojejy.

Lemurs have drawn much attention to Madagascar and its endangered species. In this capacity, they act as flagship species, the most notable of which is the ring-tailed lemur, which is considered an icon of the country. The presence of lemurs in national parks helps drive ecotourism, which especially helps local communities living in the vicinity of the national parks, since it offers employment opportunities and the community receives half of the park entrance fees. In the case of Ranomafana National Park, job opportunities and other revenue from long-term research can rival that of ecotourism.

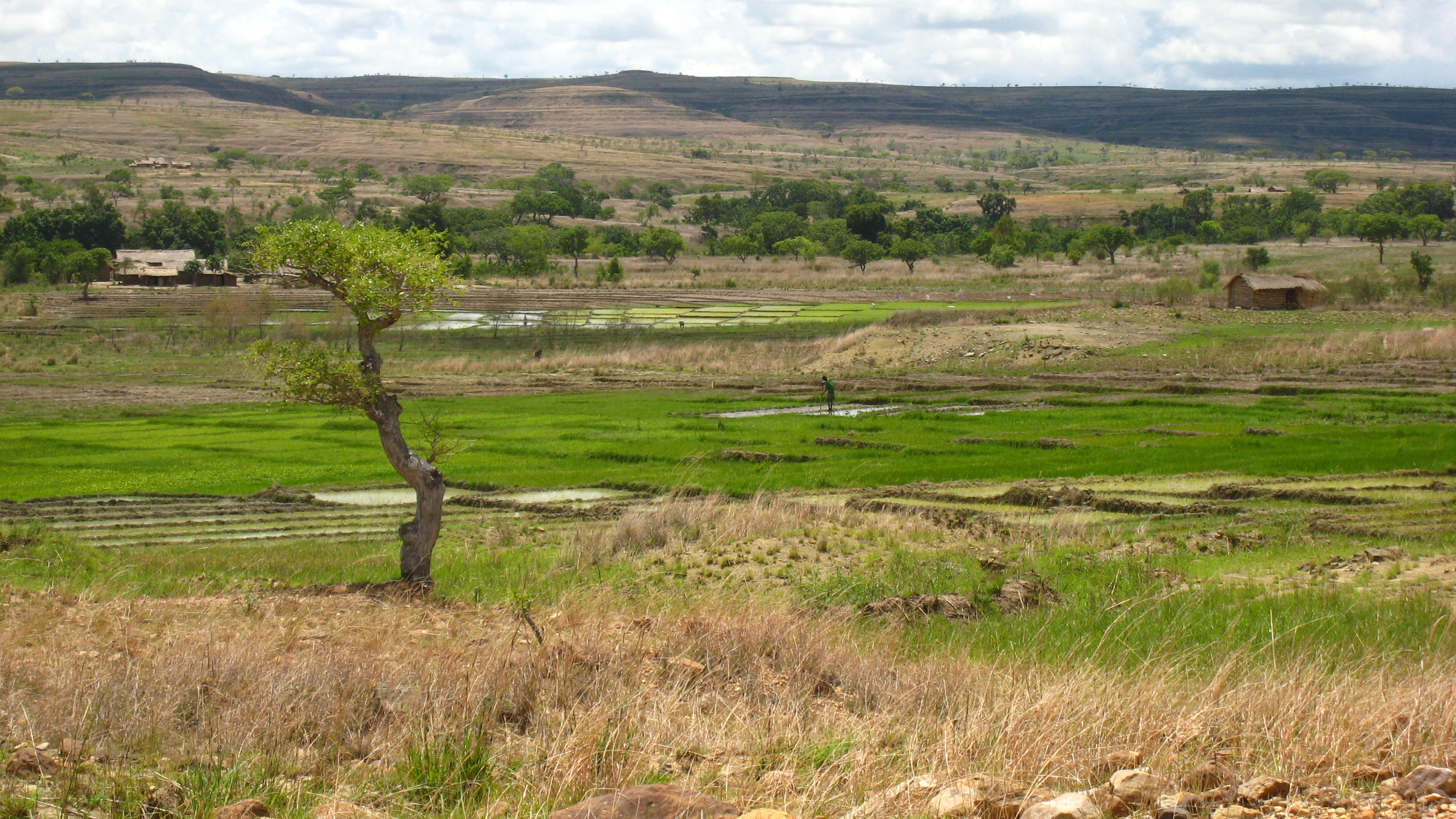
Rice paddies have gradually replaced lemur habitat, particularly in the central part of the island.

Starting in 1927, the Malagasy government has declared all lemurs as "protected" by establishing protected areas that are now classified under three categories: National Parks (Parcs Nationaux), Strict Nature Reserves (Réserves Naturelles Intégrales), and Special Reserves (Réserves Spéciales). There are currently 18 national parks, 5 strict nature reserves, and 22 special reserves, as well as several other small private reserves, such as Berenty Reserve and Sainte Luce Private Reserve, both near Fort Dauphin. All protected areas, excluding the private reserves, comprise approximately 3% of the land surface of Madagascar and are managed by Madagascar National Parks, formerly known as l'Association Nationale pour la Gestion des Aires Protégées (ANGAP), as well as other non-governmental organizations (NGOs), including Conservation International (CI), the Wildlife Conservation Society (WCS), and the World Wide Fund for Nature (WWF). Most lemur species are covered by this network of protected areas, and a few species can be found in multiple parks or reserves.

Conservation is also facilitated by the Madagascar Fauna Group (MFG), an association of nearly 40 zoos and related organizations, including the Duke Lemur Center, the Durrell Wildlife Conservation Trust, and the Saint Louis Zoological Park. This international NGO supports Madagascar's Parc Ivoloina, helps protect Betampona Reserve and other protected areas, and promotes field research, breeding programs, conservation planning, and education in zoos. One of their major projects involved the release of captive black-and-white ruffed lemurs, designed to help restock the dwindling population within Betampona Reserve.

Habitat corridors are needed for linking these protected areas so that small populations are not isolated. In September 2003 in Durban, South Africa, Madagascar's former president Marc Ravalomanana promised to triple the size of the island's protected areas in five years. This became known as the "Durban Vision". In June 2007, the World Heritage Committee included a sizable portion of Madagascar's eastern rainforests as a new UNESCO World Heritage Site.

Debt relief may help Madagascar protect its biodiversity. With the political crisis in 2009, illegal logging has proliferated and now threatens rainforests in the northeast, including its lemur inhabitants and the ecotourism that the local communities rely upon.

Captive lemur populations are maintained locally and outside of Madagascar in varied zoological conservatories and research centers, although the diversity of species is limited. Sikafas, for instance, do not survive well in captivity, so few facilities have them. The largest captive lemur population can be found at the Duke Lemur Center (DLC) in North Carolina, whose mission includes non-invasive research, conservation (e.g. captive breeding), and public education. Another large lemur colony is located in the Myakka City Lemur Reserve in Florida, run by the Lemur Conservation Foundation (LCF), which also hosts lemur research. In Madagascar, Lemurs' Park is a free-range, private facility southwest of Antananarivo that exhibits lemurs for the public while also rehabilitating captive-born lemurs for reintroduction into the wild.

== In Malagasy culture ==
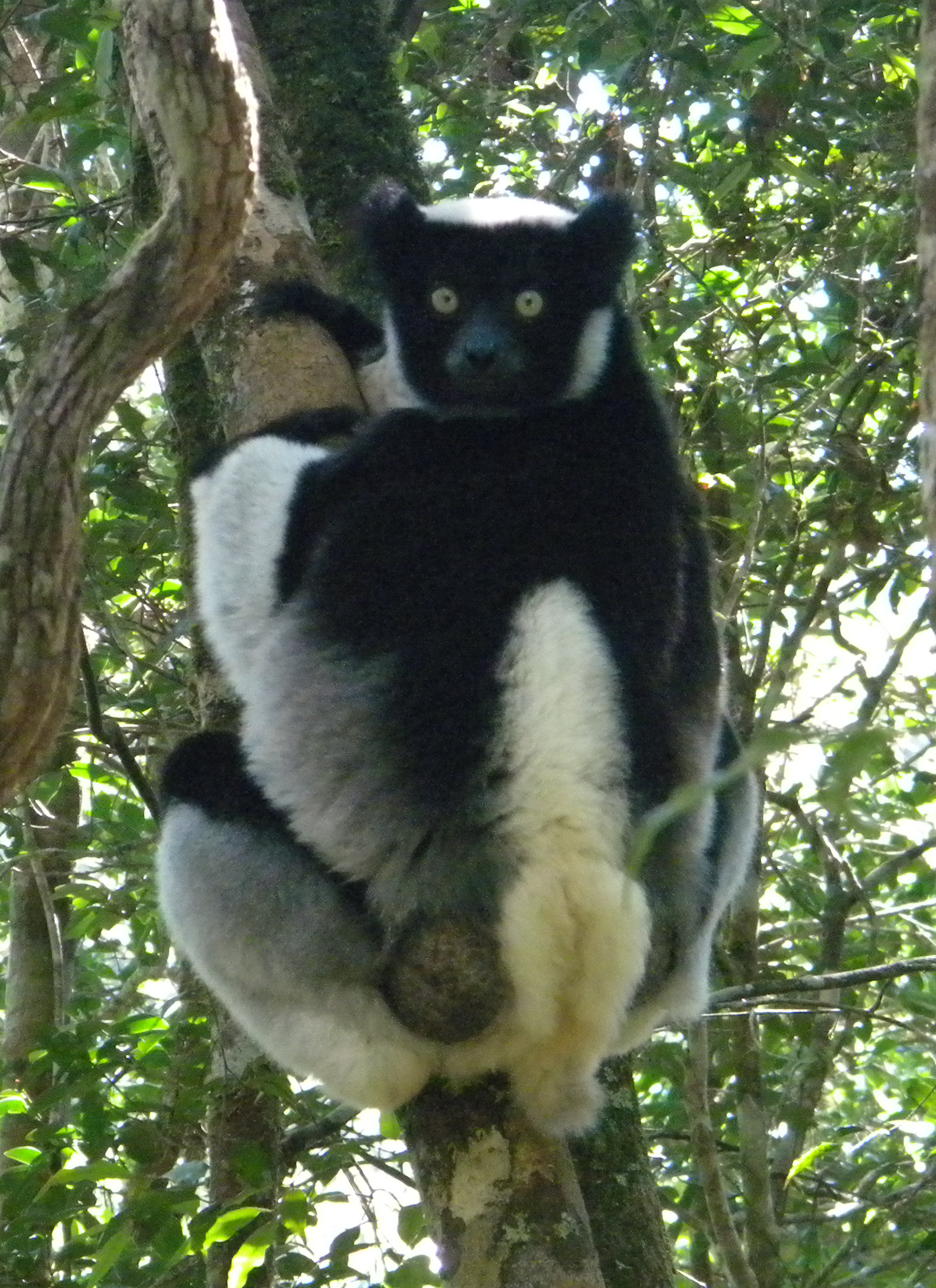
The indri is known locally as babakoto, which translates to "Ancestor of Man".

In Malagasy culture, lemurs, and animals in general, have souls (ambiroa) which can get revenge if mocked while alive or if killed in a cruel fashion. Because of this, lemurs, like many other elements of daily life, have been a source of taboos, known locally as fady, which can be based around stories with four basic principles. A village or region may believe that a certain type of lemur may be the ancestor of the clan. They may also believe that a lemur's spirit may get revenge. Alternatively, the animal may appear as a benefactor. Lemurs are also thought to impart their qualities, good or bad, onto human babies. In general, fady extend beyond a sense of the forbidden, but can include events that bring bad luck.

One example of lemur fady told around 1970 comes from Ambatofinandrahana in the Fianarantsoa Province. According to the account, a man brought a lemur home in a trap, but alive. His children wanted to keep the lemur as a pet, but when the father told them it was not a domestic animal, the children asked to kill it. After the children tortured the lemur, it eventually died and was eaten. A short time later, all the children died of illness. As a result, the father declared that anyone who tortures lemurs for fun shall "be destroyed and have no descendants."

Fady can not only help protect lemurs and their forests under stable socioeconomic situations, but they can also lead to discrimination and persecution if a lemur is known to bring bad fortune, for instance, if it walks through town. In other ways, fady does not protect all lemurs equally. For example, although the hunting and eating of certain species may be taboo, other species may not share that same protection and are therefore targeted instead. Fady can vary from village to village within the same region. If people move to a new village or region, their fady may not apply to the lemur species that are locally present, making them available for consumption. Fady restrictions on lemur meat can be relaxed in times of famine and drought.

The aye-aye is almost universally viewed unfavorably across Madagascar, though the tales vary from village to village and region to region. If people see an aye-aye, they may kill it and hang the corpse on a pole near a road outside of town (so others can carry the bad fortunes away) or burn their village and move. The superstitions behind aye-aye fady include beliefs that they kill and eat chickens or people, that they kill people in their sleep by cutting their aortic vein, that they embody ancestral spirits, or that they warn of illness, death, or bad luck in the family. As of 1970, the people of the Marolambo District in the Toamasina Province feared the aye-aye because they believed it had supernatural powers. Because of this, no one was allowed to mock, kill, or eat one.

There are also widespread fady about indri and sifakas. They are often protected from hunting and consumption because of their resemblance to humans and their ancestors, mostly due to their large size and upright or orthograde posture. The resemblance is even stronger for indri, which lack the long tail of most living lemurs. Known locally as babakoto ("Ancestor of Man"), the indri is sometimes seen as the progenitor of the family or clan. There are also stories of an indri that helped a human down from a tree, so they are seen as benefactors. Other lemur fady include the belief that a wife will have ugly children if her husband kills a woolly lemur, or that if a pregnant woman eats a dwarf lemur, her baby will get its beautiful, round eyes.

== In popular culture ==
Lemurs have also become popular in Western culture in recent years. The DreamWorks Animation franchise Madagascar features the characters King Julien, Maurice and Mort and was seen by an estimated 100 million people in theaters and 200–300 million people on DVD worldwide. Prior to this film, Zoboomafoo, a Public Broadcasting Service (PBS) children's television series from 1999 to 2001, helped to popularize sifakas by featuring a live Coquerel's sifaka from the Duke Lemur Center as well as a puppet. A twenty-episode series called Lemur Kingdom (in the United States) or Lemur Street (in the United Kingdom and Canada) aired in 2008 on Animal Planet. It combined the typical animal documentary with dramatic narration to tell the story of two groups of ring-tailed lemurs at Berenty Private Reserve.
