= International Journal of Primatology =

- Discipline: primatology
- Language: English
- Edited by: Prof Joanna M. Setchell (Jo, she/her)

Publication details
- History: 1980—present
- Publisher: Springer (Netherlands/United States)
- Frequency: bimonthly
- Open access: Hybrid open access
- Impact factor: 1.927 (2018)

Standard abbreviations
- ISO 4: Int. J. Primatol.

Indexing
- CODEN: IJPRDA
- ISSN: 0164-0291 (print); 1573-8604 (web)
- LCCN: 80648062
- OCLC no.: 04556695

Links
- Journal homepage; Online access

The International Journal of Primatology is a peer-reviewed academic journal that publishes original research papers on the study of primates, data descriptors, review articles, book reviews, commentaries, and brief communications. Special Issues or Special Sections are published from time to time.

Articles published in the journal are drawn from a number of disciplines involved in primatological research, including anthropology, zoology, psychology, palaeontology, sociology, genetics, and conservation biology.

Articles reporting on species threatened with extinction are highlighted, to raise awareness of the plight of primates.

== Publication history ==
The International Journal of Primatology was established in 1980, in response to proposals for a peer-reviewed journal of primatology made during the 6th Congress of the International Primatological Society in 1976.

The journal was first published in March 1980, and is the official journal of the International Primatological Society. It was initially published quarterly on behalf of the society by Plenum Press, now part of Springer Science+Business Media. In 1988 the publication frequency increased to bimonthly.

== Editors ==
Founding editors:

- Matt Cartmill, Duke University Medical Center, USA
- Gerald A. Doyle, University of the Witwatersrand, South Africa

Editor-in-Chief 1989-2009:

- Russel H Tuttle

Editor-in-Chief 2009 onwards:

- Joanna M Setchell (Jo, she/her), Professor of Anthropology, Durham University, UK.

There are five associate editors, and a book review editor. An Editorial Board serves to represent the international nature of the journal and the broad range of expertise in primatology.

== Editorial policy ==
The International Journal of Primatology has taken a deliberate set of actions to address diversity, and inclusion in the journal, including

- Providing detailed instructions for authors and guidelines for reviewers, in multiple languages
- Introducing double-blind peer review
- Examining submissions, acceptance rates, and invitations to review with respect to gender and the author’s country of affiliation and basing further actions on the findings.
- Diversifying the Associate Editors to better reflect the global primatological community.
- Ensuring gender parity and improving geographical diversity in the Editorial Board.
- Diversifying the reviewer pool.
- Introducing an Inclusion and Diversity statement to raise awareness of neo-colonial science.
- Publishing translated abstracts in the main text, and translated manuscripts as supplementary material.

== Open science ==
Where they qualify, articles accepted in the International Journal of Primatology are awarded Open Science Framework badges to recognise open scientific practices, including: Open Data Badges and Open Analytical Code Badges.
