= International Primatological Society =

Organization focused on primates

The International Primatological Society (IPS) is a scientific, educational, and charitable organization focused on non-human primates. It encourages scientific research in all areas of study, facilitates international cooperation among researchers, and promotes primate conservation.

Together with the IUCN Species Survival Commission Primate Specialist Group (IUCN/SSC PSG) and Conservation International (CI), it jointly publishes a biannual report entitled Primates in Peril: The World's 25 Most Endangered Primates.

Jan van Hooff served as secretary general of the organization.

== See also ==
- International Journal of Primatology
