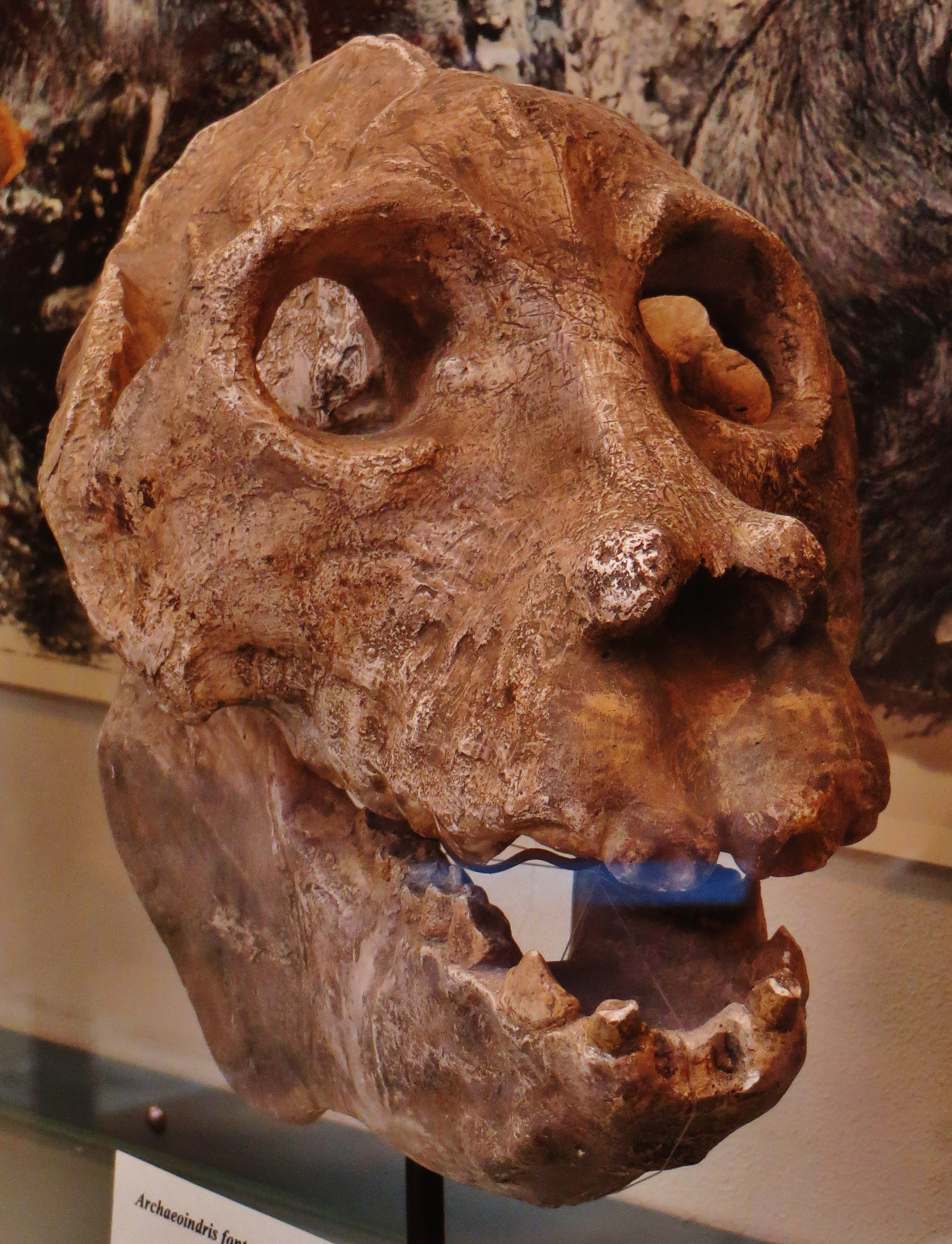
- Archaeoindris fontoynontii skull

Scientific classification
- Kingdom: Animalia
- Phylum: Chordata
- Class: Mammalia
- Order: Primates
- Suborder: Strepsirrhini
- Family: †Palaeopropithecidae
- Genus: †Archaeoindris; Standing, 1909
- Species: †A. fontoynontii

Binomial name
- †Archaeoindris fontoynontii Standing, 1909
- Subfossil sites for Archaeoindris fontoynontii

Synonyms
- Lemuridotherium madagascariense Standing, 1910

= Archaeoindris =

Archaeoindris Temporal range: Pleistocene-Holocene

Extinct giant lemur

Archaeoindris fontoynontii is an extinct giant lemur and the largest primate known to have evolved on Madagascar, comparable in size to a male gorilla. It belonged to a family of extinct lemurs known as "sloth lemurs" (Palaeopropithecidae), and because of its extremely large size, it has been compared to the ground sloths that once roamed North and South America. It was most closely related to Palaeopropithecus, the second-largest type of sloth lemur. Along with the other sloth lemurs, Archaeoindris was related to the living indri, sifakas, and woolly lemurs, as well as the recently extinct monkey lemurs (Archaeolemuridae). The genus, Archaeoindris translates to "ancient indri-like lemur".

Archaeoindris was first described by Herbert F. Standing in 1909 on the basis of subfossil fragmentary jaws, although Charles Lamberton later discovered a complete skull. Only six bones from the lower skeleton have been found, and excavations in the 1980s offered no leads for new finds. Its remains have been found at only one location: Ampasambazimba, a subfossil site in central Madagascar. Following its initial discovery, some subfossil remains of Megaladapis grandidieri (a type of extinct koala lemur) were mistakenly associated with Archaeoindris, while smaller leg bones from a juvenile and a massive adult leg bone were erroneously assumed to belong to two separate species. These errors were gradually corrected between the 1930s and 1980s.

The skeleton of Archaeoindris was massive and robust, and shared many traits with that of Palaeopropithecus. The arms were longer than the legs, but no hand or foot bones have been found for comparison with the other sloth lemurs. Size estimates based on the limited remains have varied widely, ranging as high as 244 kilograms (538 pounds), but the most thorough statistical investigation using regression analyses predicts a mass of 160 kg (350 lb).

Misattributions and limited remains have resulted in varying opinions about the way Archaeoindris moved, ranging from tree- to ground-dwelling in its environment. Its skeleton suggests it was a deliberate climber that visited the ground to travel.

The diet of Archaeoindris was mostly leaves, and its habitat—prior to human arrival—was a mix of woodlands, bushlands, and savanna, rich in lemur diversity. Today, the region is dominated by grasslands, and lemur diversity is very low in the nearest protected area, Ambohitantely Special Reserve. Although it was a rare lemur, it was still extant when humans first arrived on Madagascar, and it would have been vulnerable to hunting and habitat loss.

== Etymology ==
The generic name Archaeoindris, meaning "ancient indri-like lemur", is derived from the Greek word ἀρχαῖος (archaios, or "ancient") and indris, a common variation of the generic name Indri. The species name, fontoynontii (sometimes spelled fontoynonti), was selected in honor of Antoine Maurice Fontoynont, the president of the Académie Malgache (Malagasy Academy) at the time. Fontoynont was reported to have been supervising the excavation when it was discovered.

== Evolutionary history ==
Archaeoindris was a type of sloth lemur (family Palaeopropithecidae), a recently extinct family of giant lemurs (known as subfossil lemurs) native to Madagascar. Its ancestors were likely arboreal (tree-dwelling), and this giant sloth lemur has been compared to the extinct giant ground sloths of North and South America.

Phylogeny of Archaeoindris and its closest lemur relatives

- - †Archaeolemuridae
    - †Archaeolemur
    - †Hadropithecus
  - †Palaeopropithecidae
    - †Mesopropithecus
    - - †Babakotia
      - - †Palaeopropithecus
        - †Archaeoindris
  - Indriidae
    - Indri (indri)
    - Propithecus (sifakas)
    - Avahi (woolly lemurs)

Archaeoindris was most closely related to Palaeopropithecus, a genus containing the second largest of the sloth lemurs and specialized for suspensory behavior in its arboreal habitat. Traits of the postcranium (skeleton below the skull) indicate that Babakotia was the next most closely related sloth lemur to Archaeoindris and Palaeopropithecus, followed by Mesopropithecus, the smallest of the sloth lemurs.

All four genera of sloth lemurs are known to be a sister taxon (close relatives) of family Indriidae, which includes the indri (Indri), sifakas (Propithecus), and woolly lemurs (Avahi). This relationship is supported by data from morphological, developmental and molecular research. Another member of this clade (related group) is the family of monkey lemurs (Archaeolemuridae). Dental features, such as the morphology of their molar teeth and the modified number of teeth in their toothcomb (a specialized grooming structure found in lemuriforms), have long suggested a relationship.

Other anatomical and developmental traits, though, suggested that monkey lemurs might be more closely related to family Lemuridae, which include five genera of lemur, including the ring-tailed lemur (Lemur catta). Molecular analysis has shown strong support for the former, placing the monkey lemurs in a clade with the sloth lemurs and indriids.

=== Taxonomic classification ===
The family Palaeopropithecidae contains a large number of species compared to most other subfossil lemur families. It includes four known genera and seven species, all of which are now extinct. Among these was the genus Archaeoindris, one of only a few monotypic lemur taxa.

Archaeoindris fontoynontii was first described by Herbert F. Standing in 1909 from two fragments of a maxilla (upper jaw) and a complete mandible (lower jaw). These type specimens—AM-6239 (maxillae) and AM-6237 (mandible)—are stored in the collection at the University of Antananarivo. The mandible contains a complete set of upper teeth, the left maxillary fragment contains the last premolar (P4) and all three molars (M1–M3), and the right maxillary fragment bears both premolars (P2 and P4) and the first molar (M1).

At the time, Standing noted similarities with the dentition of Palaeopropithecus. Sixteen years after Standing's discovery, Charles Lamberton discovered the first and only complete cranium (skull) and associated mandible for Archaeoindris, both of which were well preserved. He published this find in 1934.

Only six postcranial specimens of Archaeoindris have been found. Two of these belonged to an adult and include a damaged humerus (upper arm bone) and an almost complete femur (thigh bone). The other four came from an immature individual, and include a damaged humerus, a damaged ulna (lower arm bone), and two femurs, both lacking the epiphyses (rounded end of the bone) on both ends.

Archaeoindris is one of the least common of the subfossil lemurs, and the few known specimens were all found at Ampasambazimba in the Central Highlands. Excavations run by a multidisciplinary Malagasy-American team at this fossil site between 1983 and 1984 yielded no new subfossil remains, and no other potential sites are known for this species.

Historically, some remains from other subfossil lemurs have been mistakenly attributed to Archaeoindris, resulting in incorrect interpretations of its anatomy and behavior. In 1934, Lamberton missed earlier attribution errors and incorrectly labeled a tibia and two fibulae (lower leg bones) from a species of koala lemur (Megaladapis grandidieri) as belonging to Archaeoindris. Because of these misattributions and Lamberton's use of the immature bones, his reconstruction was inaccurate.

In 1936, Alice Carleton corrected Lamberton by identifying the tibia and fibulae as belonging to a koala lemur. Carleton's corrections were later confirmed and other misattributions were corrected in the 1960s and 1970s by Alan Walker and William L. Jungers.

In 1910, 24 years before Lamberton's monograph on Archaeoindris, Standing identified a massive right femur from Ampasambazimba as a new species, Lemuridotherium madagascariense. Although Standing recognized the strong similarities between Lemuridotherium and Archaeoindris, he placed them in separate genera due to what he perceived as a great size difference. Lamberton was also persuaded by the size difference, partly because he failed to recognize the smaller tibia and fibulae as belonging to the smaller Megaladapis grandidieri. Furthermore, Lamberton did not realize that the smaller femurs he assigned to Archaeoindris belonged to a juvenile.

Although some later authors considered Lemuridotherium a synonym of Archaeoindris, no one had provided provided a definitive proof until Martine Vuillaume-Randriamanantena in 1988. Vuillaume-Randriamanantena also established associations between the postcrania and crania of Archaeoindris, summarized what is known about the postcranial skeleton, and documented the strong similarity with the genus Palaeopropithecus.

== Anatomy and physiology ==
Though similar to Palaeopropithecus, Archaeoindris was significantly larger and more robust. Archaeoindris was one of the largest primates to ever evolve, and was the largest-known strepsirrhine primate, weighing an estimated 160 kg (350 lb). It was roughly the size of an adult male gorilla, which was first noted by Lamberton.

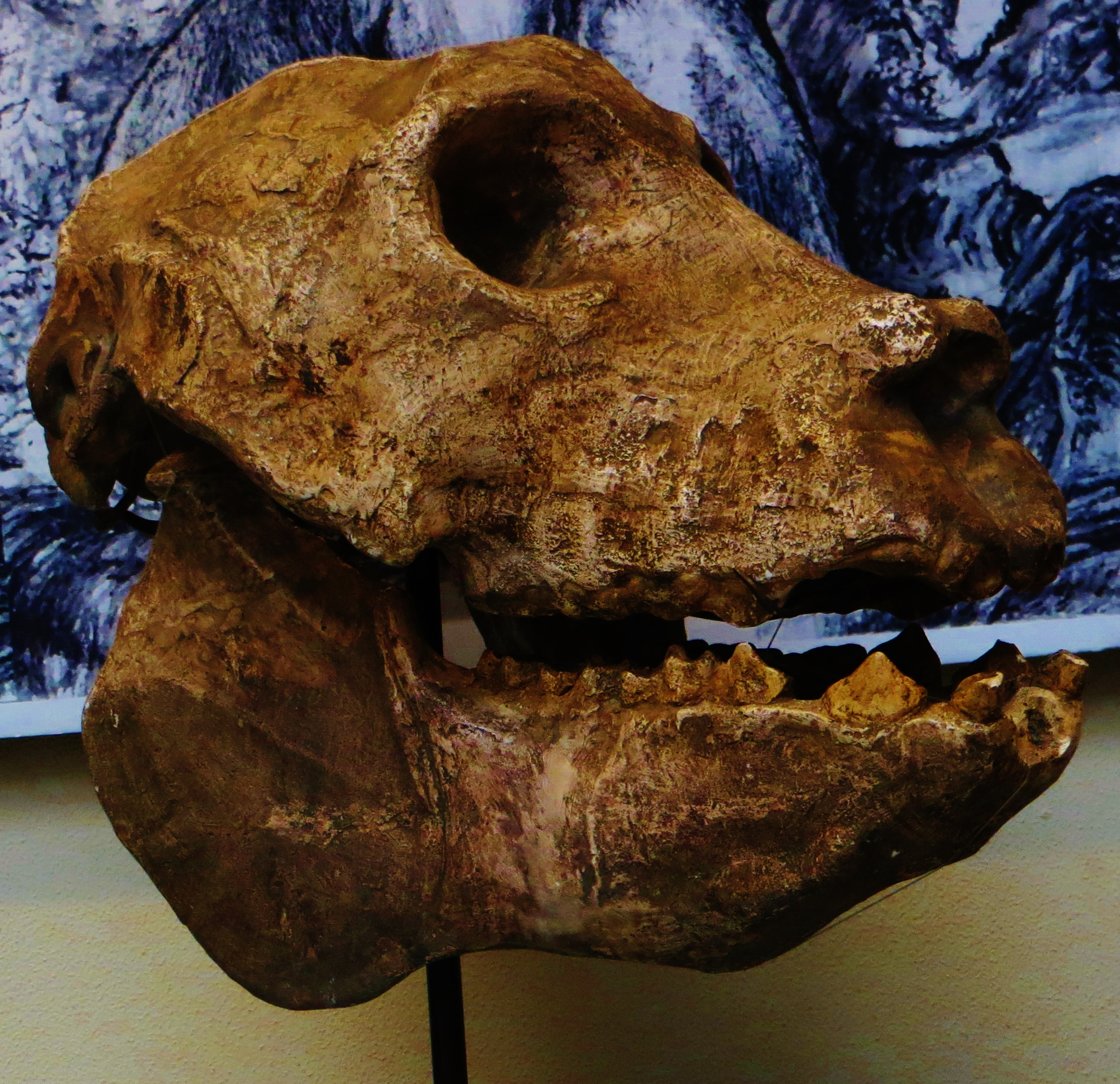
The skull of Archaeoindris was wide and short, with a pair of bony protrusions around the nasal openings (National Museum of Natural History, Paris).

Since its discovery, size estimates have varied from "larger than a human" to "possibly the largest primate ever". In a study by Jungers from 1990, the area of its molar teeth predicted a mass of 230.5 kg (508 lb), while the femoral head diameter predicted a mass of 244.1 kg (538 lb). In 1995, Laurie Godfrey estimated a mass of 197.5 kg (435 lb) using the midshaft circumferences of the humerus and femur. Using multiple regressions of the cortical area of the femur in 2008, Jungers and colleagues generated the current best estimate of 161.2 kg (355 lb) with a possible range of 150–187.8 kg (331–414 lb). These estimates were considered to be more accurate since the harder cortical bone in the midshaft of the femur supported an animal's weight, and its thickness better correlated with the animal's mass than the midshaft diameter (which includes both hard cortex and spongy bone). The only fossil primate that was probably larger than Archaeoindris was Gigantopithecus blacki, a close relative of orangutans.

Like all three species of Palaeopropithecus, Archaeoindris exhibited derived traits not seen in the two other, less-specialized genera of sloth lemurs. These traits included deflated auditory bullae and paired protrusions of bone around the nasal opening consisting of part of the premaxilla and the nasal bones. Its skull was wider than that of Megaladapis, but shorter, measuring 269 mm (10.6 in). Its face was shorter than that of Palaeopropithecus, with its eyes directed further forward. The neurocranium (braincase) was small and elevated relative to the face, unlike Palaeopropithecus. Postorbital constriction (narrowing of the skull behind the eye sockets) is pronounced. The skull also bore a low, broad sagittal crest (a ridge of bone on the top of the skull to which jaw muscles attach) and robust but smaller nuchal crests (ridges of bone on the back of the skull to which neck muscles attach).

The rims of the orbits (eye sockets) were not as thick as those of Palaeopropithecus. The area of the orbit was 946 mm^{2} (1.466 sq in), comparable to that of gorillas. The ratio of its orbit area to the size of its optic canal indicates that Archaeoindris had low retinal summation, meaning its eyes were as sensitive to light as those of living diurnal lemurs, yet the ratio was not as low as in comparably sized apes, suggesting Archaeoindris had lower visual acuity than apes do and lacked trichromatic color vision.

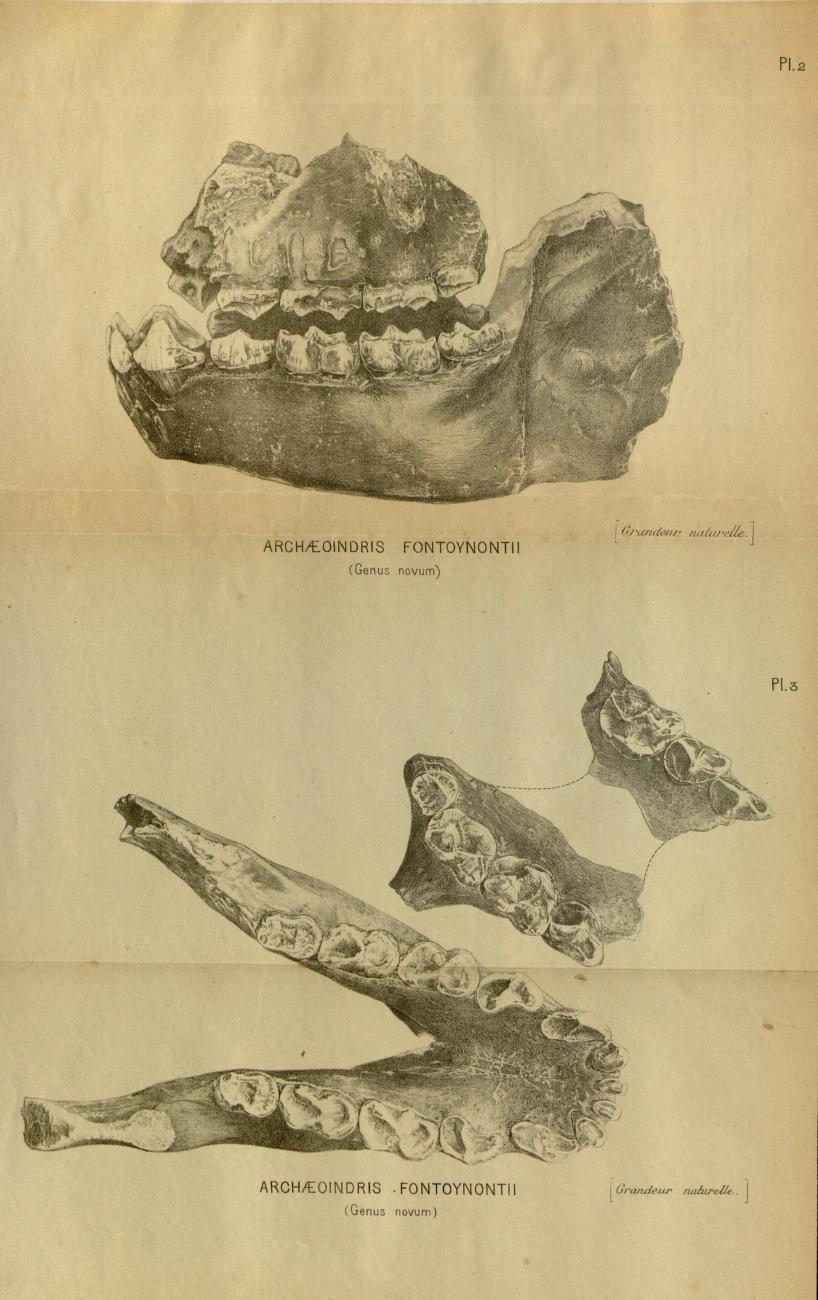
Mandible and fragmentary maxillae of A. fontoynontii (1909)

The jaw exhibited a long, robust mandibular symphysis (joining of the two halves of the lower jaw), which fused early during development. Its palate (bones on the roof of the mouth) was rectangular. Like other sloth lemurs, it likely experienced accelerated dental development, and had an adult dental formula of 2.1.2.32.0.2.3. Its teeth were also similar to those of Palaeopropithecus, both in morphology and proportions. The four lower incisors that would have made up the toothcomb were modified, being shorter and more robust, possibly for feeding purposes. The canines were short and stout, but sharp. Also, there was a diastema (gap) between the lower premolars (p2 and p4). Other dental similarities with Palaeopropithecus included small third upper and lower molars (M3 and m3), the first and second molars were narrow and long, and the enamel of its cheek teeth was crenulated (low and rounded), though not as wrinkled and slightly higher-crowned.

Most bones of the postcranial skeleton, including the bones of the hands, feet, vertebral column, ribs, radius (lower arm bone), tibia, and fibula, have not been found for Archaeoindris. As with many cranial features, the postcranial bones that have been discovered are similar to those of Palaeopropithecus, but significantly larger and more robust. The head of the femur was large and lacked a fovea capitis femoris (a small depression in the head of the femur). The femur was short and extremely robust, had a very high collodiaphyseal angle (the angle of the neck and shaft of the bone), and the greater trochanter was small.

In the adult, the humerus was significantly longer than the femur, while in the immature specimen, both the humerus and ulna were much longer than the femur, making the arms considerably longer than the legs, as also seen in Palaeopropithecus. Yet, the relative length of arms to legs was shorter in Archaeoindris, so although its intermembral index was over 100, it was lower than that of Palaeopropithecus.

== Behavior ==
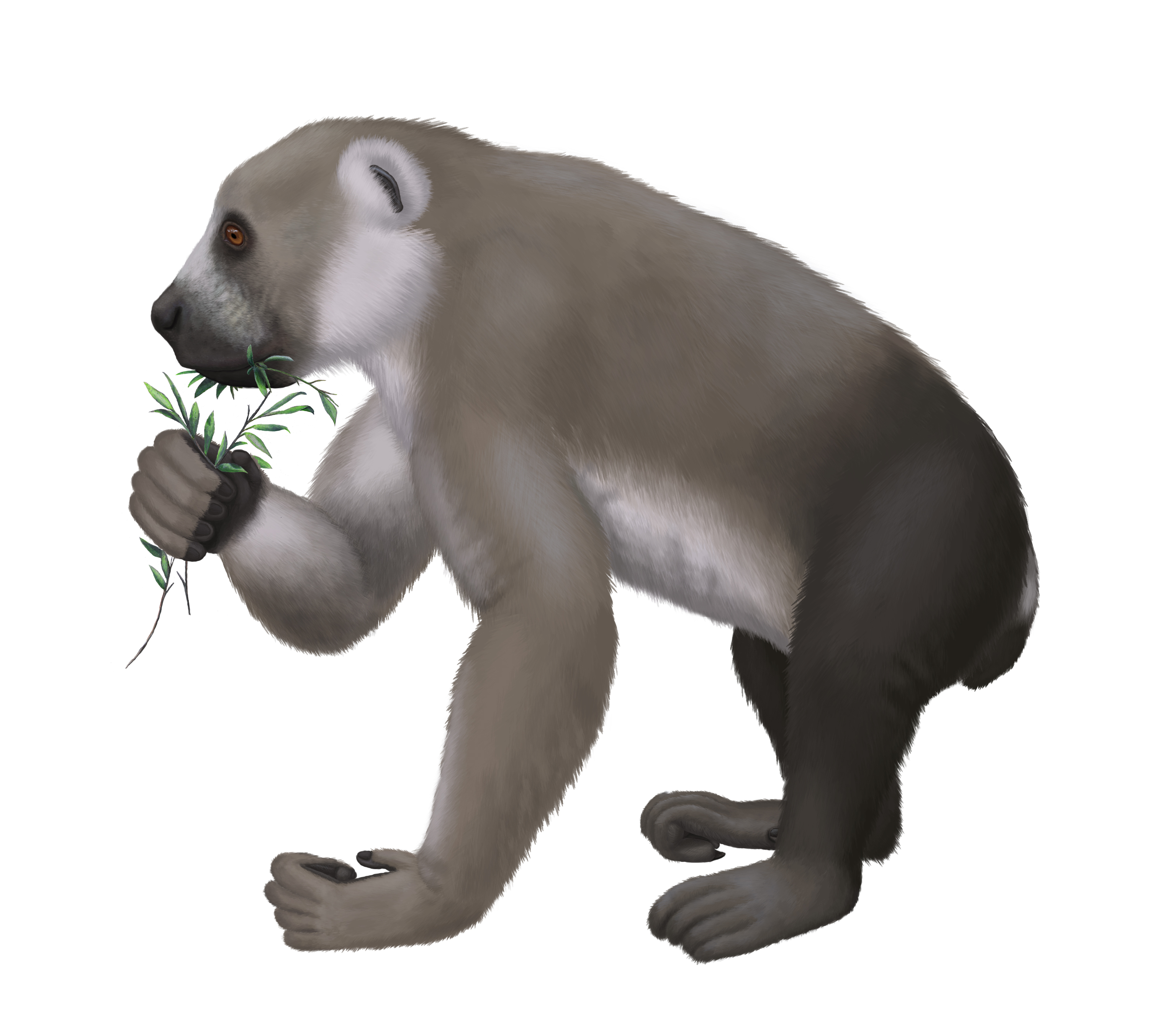
Life restoration of Archaeoindris fontoynontii

Archaeoindris is thought to have been a leaf-eater (folivorous), a view supported by wear patterns on its teeth. Its fused mandibular symphyses and the likelihood of accelerated dental development suggest that it began processing fibrous foods in the mouth with thorough chewing. Its diet may also have included some fruits and seeds. Like most of the other giant lemurs, Archaeoindris is thought to have been diurnal because of its relatively small orbits, which are comparable to those of gorillas.

Both Standing and Lamberton assumed Archaeoindris to be a slow-moving tree-dweller like Megaladapis, primarily due to the misattributed bones. Lamberton also speculated that it would have resembled a ground sloth, a view later supported by Jungers in 1980 after several misattributions had been corrected and having considered its gorilla-like size. Jungers went on to propose that it would have spent most of its time on the ground (terrestrial).

The functional morphology of its hip joint indicates a degree of mobility typically seen in more arboreal animals. Other traits shared with Palaeopropithecus, particularly seen in the femur, suggest that Archaeoindris spent considerable time in the trees for feeding and possibly nesting, although it also would have visited the ground to feed and travel. It is described as a deliberate, scansorial (climbing) browser, and whether it was like Palaeopropithecus in performing hang-feeding is unknown, since hand and foot bones are missing. Given its bulky size, this would be unexpected.

== Distribution and habitat ==
Archaeoindris is known from only one subfossil site, Ampasambazimba, in central Madagascar, and all remains date to the Late Quaternary. The area today is dominated by grasslands, particularly of the grass genus Aristida. Prior to human arrival, the area around Ampasambazimba was not completely forested, but more of an open habitat, consisting of a mix of woodlands, bushlands, and savanna. Animal remains at this subfossil site have yielded about 20 species of lemurs living in sympatry (sharing the same geographic area). In comparison, the nearby Ambohitantely Special Reserve today contains only four species, roughly 20% of the area's original lemur diversity.

== Extinction ==
Despite being the most species-rich family among the giant lemurs, all four genera of sloth lemur, including Archaeoindris, have gone extinct. Radiocarbon dating of the stratigraphic level of some of the Archaeoindris remains were dated to 8000 BP, while two other specimens were dated to 2362–2149 BP (412–199 BCE) and 2711–2338 BP (761–388 BCE). From these dates, it is likely that Archaeoindris was still alive on the high plateau in 350 BCE when the first humans reached the west coast of Madagascar, despite being rare by that time. Consequently, it would have been especially vulnerable to hunting and habitat loss.
