= Ampasambazimba =

Mountain peak and subfossil site

- Location within Madagascar

Highest point
- Elevation: 1,036 m (3,399 ft)
- Coordinates: 18°54′00″S 46°43′48″E

Ampasambazimba is a mountain peak and subfossil site in Madagascar, near Analavory, (Itasy) most known for being the site of the remains of the extinct giant sloth lemur Archaeoindris.

Ampasambazimba is located at 1,036 meters above sea level. It was discovered in 1902 by Monsieur Raybaud, a colonial administrator at the time. In 1909, the giant sloth lemur Archaeoindris was described by Herbert F. Standing using subfossil fragments. A complete skull was later discovered by Charles Lamberton in 1925, which he then published in 1934.

Ampasambazimba is regarded as one of the most productive and most well-known subfossil sites in Madagascar. A number of sporadic excavations were conducted at Ampasambazimba, ranging from 1902 to 1984. Excavations resulted in the discovery of 15 lemuroid species, of which seven were extinct. Excavations also resulted in the discovery of 13 bird species, of which eight were extinct.

== History ==
=== Prehistoric ===
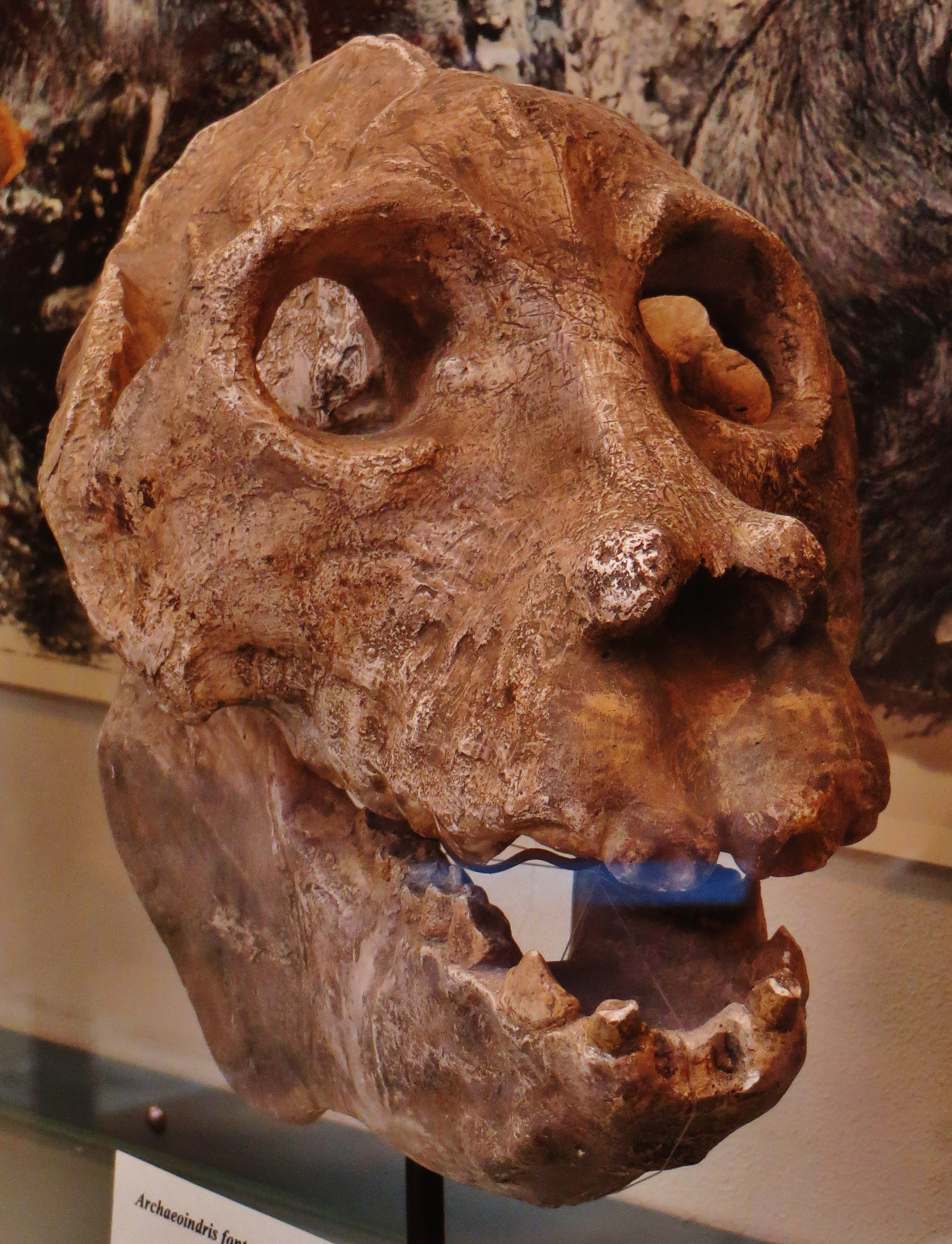
Skull of Archaeoindris fontoynonti

Radiocarbon dating suggests lemuroid species were living on Ampasambazimba over 22,000 years ago. The dating also showed that tree specimens had existed over 8,000 years ago. It has been believed that the giant sloth lemur Archaeoindris had been living when humans first set foot on Madagascar at approximately 350 BC. Subfossil evidence suggested that Megaladapis grandidieri was the last extant lemuroid species, with the subfossil sample being dated 900–1040 AD. Birds and eagles, including Stephanoaetus mahery, were also thought to have been living at Ampasambazimba over 5,500 years ago.

Prior to human arrival, Ampasambazimba was thought to have been a more open habitat, rather than a completely forested area. It consisted of a mix of woodlands, bushlands, and savanna.

=== Discovery ===
In 1902, Monsieur Raybaud, a colonial administrator, discovered Ampasambazimba and constructed a report to then-President of France Émile Loubet. This prompted a number of sporadic excavations, ranging from 1902 to 1984. Excavations unearthed an "enormous amount of bone material". 15 lemur species, including Archaeoindris and Megaladapis, were unearthed; seven were extinct. 13 bird species, including Stephanoeatus mahery, were also unearthed; eight were extinct.

== Fossil Content ==
=== Reptiles ===
==== Testudines ====
Genus	Species	Family	Material	Notes	Images
Aldabrachelys	A. grandidieri	Testudinidae			
Aldabrachelys	A. abrupta	Testudinidae			

==== Crocodylia ====
Genus	Species	Family	Material	Notes	Images
Voay	V. robustus	Crocodylidae			
Crocodylus	C. niloticus	Crocodylidae		Nile crocodile	

=== Birds ===
Aepyornithiformes

Genus	Species	Family	Material	Notes	Images
Aepyornis	A. hildebrandti	Aepyornithidae			
Aepyornis	A. maximus	Aepyornithidae			
Mullerornis	M. modestus	Aepyornithidae			

==== Anseriformes ====
Genus	Species	Family	Material	Notes	Images
Centrornis	C. majori	Anatidae			
Alopochen	A. sirabensis	Anatidae		The most common bird known from the site	
Sarkidiornis	S. melanotos	Anatidae		Knob-Billed Duck, much less common at the site then their present distribution would suggest. Possibly a recent introduction.	
Anas	A. bernieri	Anatidae		Bernier's teal, no longer found in the area.	
Anas	A. melleri	Anatidae		Meller's duck	

==== Gruiformes ====
Genus	Species	Family	Material	Notes	Image
Gallinula	G. chloropus	Rallidae		Common Moorhen	

==== Cuculiformes ====
Genus	Species	Family	Material	Notes	Image
Coua	C. berthae	Cuculidae			

==== Accipitriformes ====
Genus	Species	Family	Material	Notes	Image
Stephanoaetus	S. mahery	Accipitridae			
Aquila	A. sp A	Accipitridae			
Aquila	A. sp. B	Accipitridae			

=== Mammals ===
==== Afrosoricida ====
Genus	Species	Family	Material	Notes	Image
Plesiorycteropus	P. madagascariensis	Tenrecidae?			
Plesiorycteropus	P. germainepetterae	Tenrecidae?			
Tenrec	T. ecaudatus	Tenrecidae		Tailess tenrec	

Primates

Genus	Species	Family	Material	Notes	Image
Archaeoindris	A. fontoynontii	Palaeopropithecidae	A skull and limb elements		
Palaeopropithecus	P. maximus	Palaeopropithecidae			
Palaeopropithecus	P. ingens	Palaeopropithecidae			
Mesopropithecus	M. pithecoides	Palaeopropithecidae			
Propithecus	P. diadema	Indriidae		Diademed sifaka	
Propithecus	P. verreauxi	Indriidae		Verreaux's sifaka	
Indri	I. indri	Indriidae		The indri	
Avahi	A. laniger	Indriidae		Eastern woolly lemur	
Megaladapis	M. grandidieri	Megaladapidae			
Archaeolemur	A. edwardsi	Archaeolemuridae			
Hadropithecus	H. stenognathus	Archaeolemuridae			
Pachylemur	P. insignis	Lemuridae			
Pachylemur	P. jullyi	Lemuridae			
Eulemur	E. mongoz	Lemuridae		Mongoose lemur	
Eulemur	E. fulvus	Lemuridae		Common brown lemur	
Hapalemur	H. simus	Lemuridae		Greater bamboo lemur	
Lepilemur	L. mustelinus	Lepilemuridae		Weasel sportive lemur	
Daubentonia	D. sp	Daubentoniidae			

==== Rodentia ====
Genus	Species	Family	Material	Notes	Image
Hypogeomys	H. antimena	Nesomyidae		Malagasy giant rat	

==== Carnivora ====
Genus	Species	Family	Material	Notes	Image
Cryptoprocta	C. spelea	Eupleridae			
Cryptoprocta	C. ferox	Eupleridae		Fossa	
Galidictis	G. sp	Eupleridae			

==== Artiodactyla ====
Genus	Species	Family	Material	Notes	Images
Hippopotamus	H. madagascariensis	Hippopotamidae			
Hippopotamus	H. lemerlei	Hippopotamidae		Possibly present in Ampasambazimba	
