= Ankarana Special Reserve =

Protected area in northern Madagascar

- IUCN category IV (habitat/species management area)
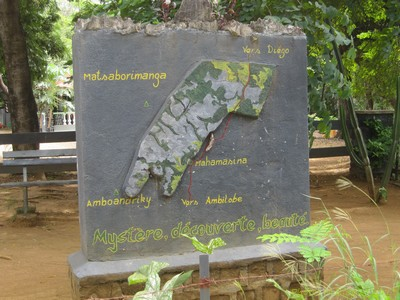
- Ankarana reserve

- Location within Madagascar
- Location: Diana Region, Madagascar
- Nearest city: Antsiranana (Diego Suarez)
- Coordinates: 13°4′22″S 48°54′53″E
- Area: 182 km^{2} (70 sq mi)
- Established: 20 February 1956
- Governing body: Madagascar National Parks

Ankarana Special Reserve is a protected area in northern Madagascar created in 1956. It is a small, partially vegetated plateau composed of 150-million-year-old middle Jurassic limestone. With an average annual rainfall of about 2,000 millimetres (79 in), the underlying rocks have been eroded to produce caves and feed subterranean rivers—a karst topography. The rugged relief and the dense vegetation have helped protect the region from human intrusion and exploitation. The Ankarana Massif is the setting for a wildlife rich adventure story for children.

The southern entrance of what is now designated the Ankarana National Park is in Mahamasina (commune of Tanambao Marivorahona) on the Route nationale 6 some 108 km south-west of Antsiranana and 29 km (18 mi) north-east of Ambilobe. There are some hotels situated close to the park headquarters at the entrance.

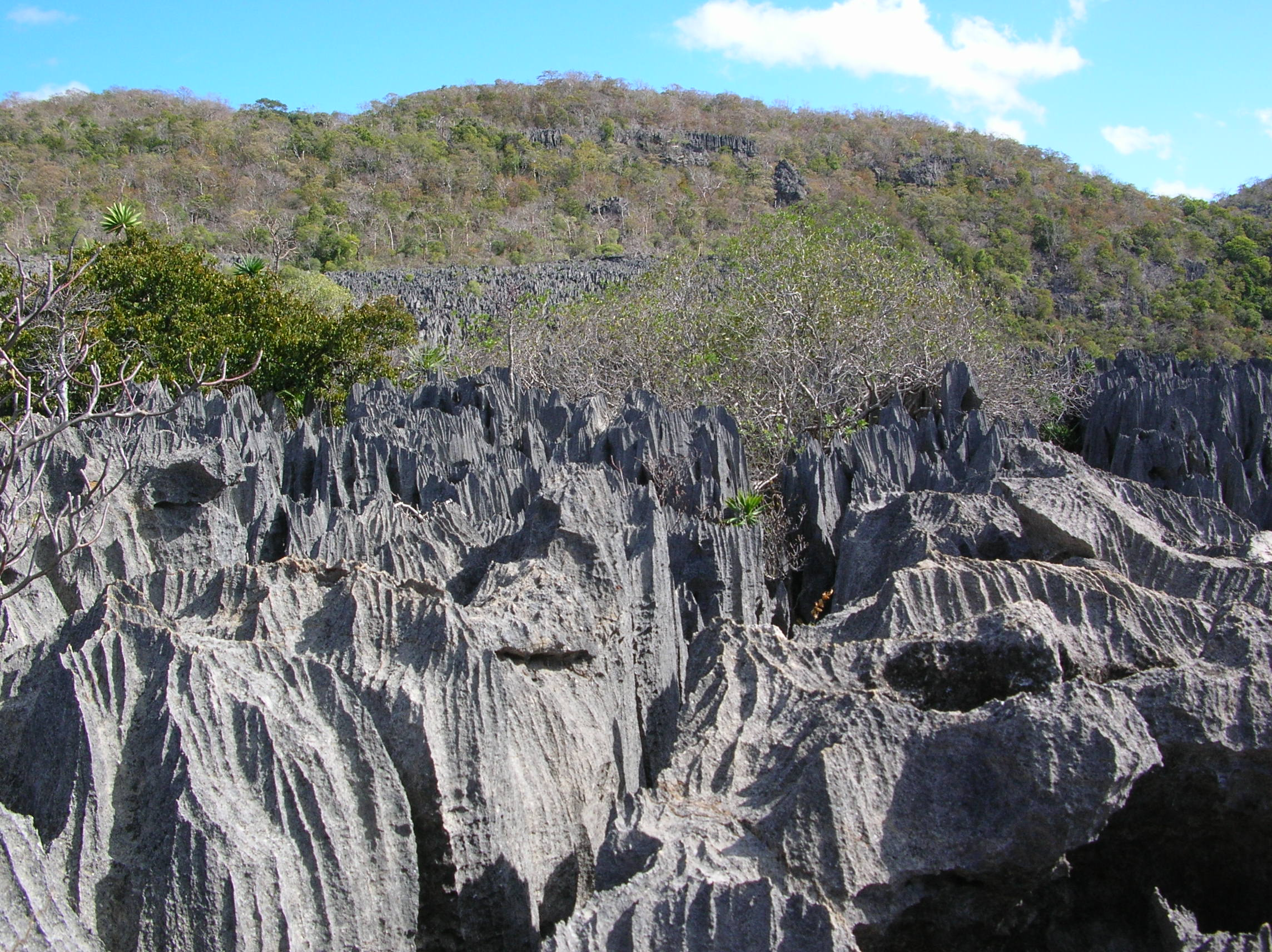
Ankarana Plateau, showing tsingy

== Geology ==
The plateau slopes gently to the east, but on the west it ends abruptly in the "Wall of Ankarana", a sheer cliff that extends 25 kilometres (16 mi) north to south, and rises up to 280 metres (920 ft). To the south, the limestone mass breaks up into separate spires known as tower karst. In the center of the plateau, seismic activity and eons of rainfall have eroded the limestone, forming deep gorges and ribbons of flowstone. In places where the calcific upper layers have been completely eroded, the harder base rock has been etched into channels and ridges known in Malagasy as tsingy meaning 'where one cannot walk barefoot'. The area is littered with basalt boulders, and basalt has also flowed deep into the canyons that dissect the massif.

== Exploration ==
Beginning in the 1960s, expatriate Frenchman Jean Duflos (who after marriage changed his name to Jean Radofilao) undertook a huge amount of exploration of the cave systems and subterranean rivers of the massif, much of it on his own or with visiting speleologists. Around 100 kilometres (62 mi) of cave passages within the massif have been mapped. La Grotte d'Andrafiabe, one of the most accessible caves, comprises at least 8.035 kilometres (4.993 mi) of horizontal passages. Indeed, the massif contains the longest cave systems in Madagascar, and probably in the whole of Africa.

== Fauna ==
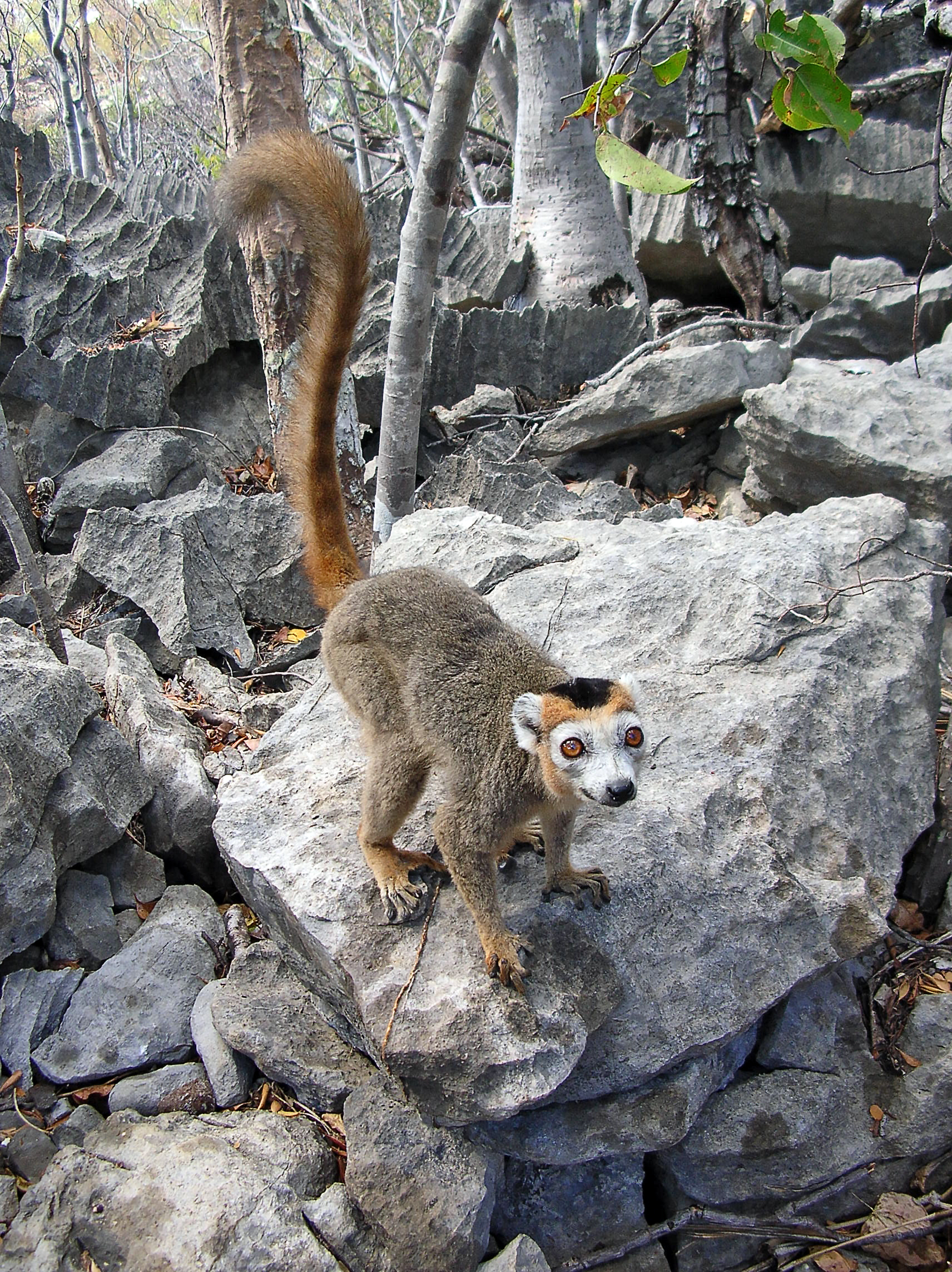
Crowned lemur photographed at the Ankarana Special Reserve

Expeditions in the 1980s first began cataloguing the animals and plants of the Ankarana Special Reserve are described in Dr Jane Wilson-Howarth's travel narrative Lemurs of the Lost World and in the scientific press. Discoveries included unexpected sub-fossil remains of large extinct lemurs and surviving but previously undescribed species of blind fish, shrimps and other invertebrates. Several expedition members contributed photos to an illustrated introductory guide to Madagascar which features the Crocodile Caves of Ankarana.

During the 1986 expedition, Phil Chapman and Jean-Elie Randriamasy collated a bird list for the reserve and recorded 65 species from 32 families representing nearly a third of all bird species that breed in Madagascar. They also noted one interesting aspect of behaviour. They reported that there was an unusual strategy used by many of the small insect-eating songbirds. Species such as the paradise flycatcher (Terpsiphone mutata), the common jery (Neomixis tenella), the greenbuls (Xanthomixis zosterops and Bernieria madagascariensis), the bulbul (Hypsipetes madagascariensis), the sunbird (Nectarinia souimanga) and the vangas (Lepopterus madagascarinus and Xenopirostris polleni) foraged together in mixed bands. Within each band different species seemed to specialise in where and how they searched out their insect prey. Some species concentrated on the trunk and branches of trees, some on slender boughs, others searched beneath the leaves. By acting together in this way they probably increased foraging efficiency as each species could catch others' escaped prey. They were also safer from attack by predators, as the group as a whole was more likely to spot approaching danger.

The Ankarana Reserve is an important refuge for significant populations of the crowned lemur (Eulemur coronatus), Sanford's brown lemur (Eulemur sanfordi) and other mammal species. The following lemurs are also recorded from the area: northern sportive lemur (Lepilemur septentrionalis), brown mouse lemur (Microcebus rufus), fat-tailed dwarf lemur (Cheirogalus medius), fork-marked lemur (Phaner furcifer), eastern woolly lemur (Avahi laniger), Perrier's sifaka (Propithicus diadema perrieri), aye-aye (Daubentonia madagascariensis) and the western lesser bamboo lemur (Hapalemur griseus occidentalis).

In addition subfossils of the following lemurs have been found at Ankarana: greater bamboo lemur (Prolemur simus), indri (Indri indri), the sloth lemur (Babakotia radofilai), Mesopropithicus dolichobrachion and Palaeopropithicus cf ingens plus Pachylemur sp., the huge Megaladapis cf madagascariensis/grandidieri, and the baboon lemur Archaeolemur sp.

== See also ==
- Madagascar dry deciduous forests
- Crowned lemur
