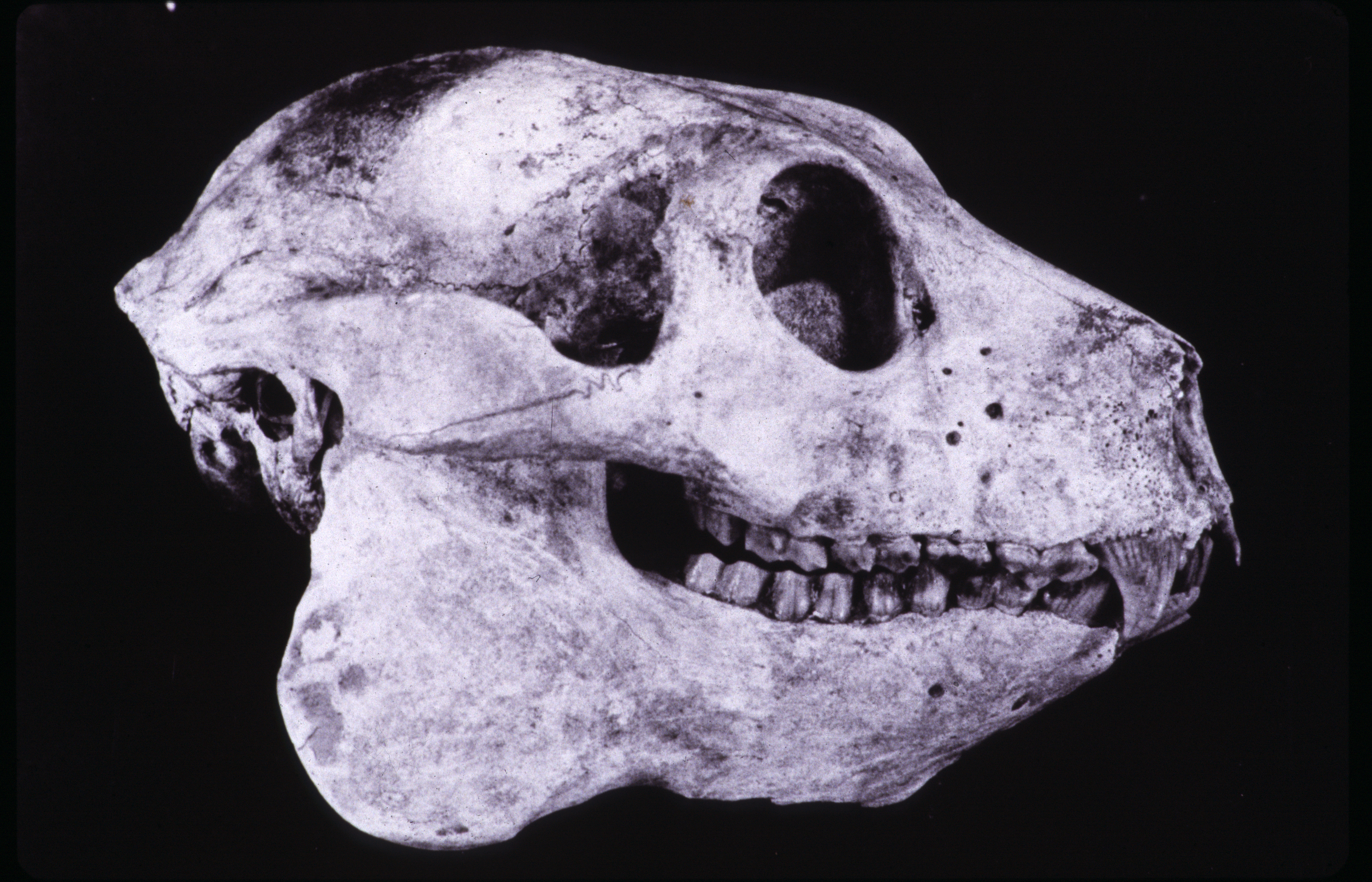
- Babakotia radofilai skull

Scientific classification
- Kingdom: Animalia
- Phylum: Chordata
- Class: Mammalia
- Order: Primates
- Suborder: Strepsirrhini
- Family: †Palaeopropithecidae
- Genus: †Babakotia; Godfrey et al., 1990
- Species: †B. radofilai

Binomial name
- †Babakotia radofilai Godfrey et al., 1990
- Subfossil sites for Babakotia radofilai

= Babakotia =

Babakotia Temporal range: Pleistocene–Northgrippian (Possible Late Miocene species)

Extinct genus of lemurs

Babakotia is an extinct genus of medium-sized lemur, or strepsirrhine primate, from Madagascar that contains a single species, Babakotia radofilai. Together with Palaeopropithecus, Archaeoindris, and Mesopropithecus, it forms the family Palaeopropithecidae, commonly known as the sloth lemurs. The name Babakotia comes from the Malagasy name for the indri, babakoto, to which it and all other sloth lemurs are closely related. Due to its mix of morphological traits that show intermediate stages between the slow-moving smaller sloth lemurs and the suspensory large sloth lemurs, it has helped determine the relationship between both groups and the closely related and extinct monkey lemurs.

Babakotia radofilai and all other sloth lemurs share many traits with living sloths, demonstrating convergent evolution. It had long forearms, curved digits, and highly mobile hip and ankle joints. Its skull was more heavily built than that of indriids, but not as much as in the larger sloth lemurs. Its dentition is similar to that of all other indriids and sloth lemurs. It lived in the northern part of Madagascar and shared its range with at least two other sloth lemur species, Palaeopropithecus ingens and Mesopropithecus dolichobrachion. Babakotia radofilai was primarily a leaf-eater (folivore), though it also ate fruit and hard seeds. It is known only from subfossil remains and may have died out shortly after the arrival of humans on the island, but not enough radiocarbon dating has been done with this species to know for certain.

== Etymology ==
The name of the genus Babakotia derives from the Malagasy common name for the Indri, babakoto, a close relative of Babakotia. The species name, radofilai, was chosen in honor of French mathematician and expatriate Jean Radofilao, an avid spelunker who mapped the caves where remains of Babakotia radofilai were first found.

== Classification and phylogeny ==
Babakotia radofilai is the sole member of the genus Babakotia and belongs to the family Palaeopropithecidae, which includes three other genera of sloth lemurs: Palaeopropithecus, Archaeoindris, and Mesopropithecus. This family in turn belongs to the infraorder Lemuriformes, which includes all the Malagasy lemurs.

The first subfossil remains of Babakotia radofilai were discovered as part of a series of expeditions following upon discoveries of Jean Radofilao and two Anglo-Malagasy reconnaissance expeditions in 1981 and 1986–7. The second wave of research was launched in the 1980s by biological anthropologist Elwyn L. Simons who unearthed in 1988 at a cave known as Antsiroandoha in the Ankarana Massif, northern Madagascar a nearly complete skeleton and skull in addition to the remains of roughly a dozen other individuals. Identified immediately as a sloth lemur (palaeopropithecid) upon its discovery, Babakotia along with Mesopropithecus helped to settle a debate about the relationship between the sloth lemurs, the monkey lemurs (family Archaeolemuridae) and the living indriids. The monkey lemurs had skulls that more closely resembled the indriids, but their teeth were very specialized and unlike those of the indriids. The larger sloth lemurs, on the other hand, retained a dentition similar to living indriids, yet differed by having more robust and specialized skulls. Babakotia and Mesopropithecus not only shared the indriid dentition, but also the indriid-like skulls, providing evidence that sloth lemurs were most closely related to living indriids, with monkey lemurs as a sister group to both. Furthermore, the discovery of Babakotia helped to demonstrate that the ancestral indriids were not "ricochetal leapers" (bouncing rapidly from tree to tree) like living indriids, but vertical climbers and hanging feeders, and possibly occasional leapers.

== Anatomy and physiology ==
Weighing between 16 and 20 kg (35 and 44 lb), Babakotia radofilai was a medium-sized lemur and noticeably smaller than the large sloth lemurs (Archaeoindris and Palaeopropithecus), but larger than the small sloth lemurs (Mesopropithecus). In many ways, it had an intermediate level of adaptations for suspensory behavior between the large sloth lemurs and the small sloth lemurs. This includes its highly mobile hip and ankle joints, as well as other specializations in the vertebral column, pelvis, and limbs. Its forelimbs were 20% longer than its hind limbs, giving it a higher intermembral index (~119) than Mesopropithecus (~97 to 113), suggesting that it was convergently similar to arboreal sloths. It had a reduced tarsus and curved, elongated digits, adapted for grasping and suggesting suspensory behavior. Its hind feet were reduced, making it well-adapted for climbing and hanging (like in other palaeopropithecids), but not leaping (like in indriids). Wrist bones found in 1999 further demonstrated that this species was a vertical climber. Additionally, analysis of its semicircular canals, lumbar vertebrae and its spinous processes indicate slow movement and climbing (antipronograde) adaptations, but not necessarily sloth-like hanging, vertical clinging, or leaping. Therefore, it was likely a slow climber like a loris and also exhibited some suspensory behavior like a sloth.

Babakotia placement within the lemur phylogeny

- Lemuriformes
  - Daubentoniidae
  - - - †Megaladapidae
      - Lemuridae
    - - - Cheirogaleidae
        - Lepilemuridae
      - - †Archaeolemuridae
        - - †Palaeopropithecidae
            - †Mesopropithecus
            - - †Babakotia
              - - †Palaeopropithecus
                - †Archaeoindris
          - Indriidae

All sloth lemurs have relatively robust skulls compared to the indriids, yet despite shared cranial features with the larger sloth lemurs, its skull still resembles that of an indri. The cranial traits shared with the other sloth lemurs include relatively small orbits, robust zygomatic arches, and a mostly rectangular hard palate. The small orbits taken into consideration with the relative size of the optic canal suggest that Babakotia had low visual acuity, which is typical for lemurs. The skull length averages 144 mm (5.7 in).

The dental formula of Babakotia radofilai was the same as the other sloth lemurs and indriids: either 2.1.2.31.1.2.3 or 2.1.2.32.0.2.3 × 2 = 30. It is unclear whether one of the teeth in the permanent dentition is an incisor or canine, resulting in these two conflicting dental formulae. Regardless, the lack of either a lower canine or incisor results in a four-tooth toothcomb instead of the more typical six-tooth strepsirrhine toothcomb. Babakotia radofilai differed slightly from indriids in having somewhat elongated premolars. Its cheek teeth had broad shearing crests and crenulated enamel.

== Distribution and ecology ==
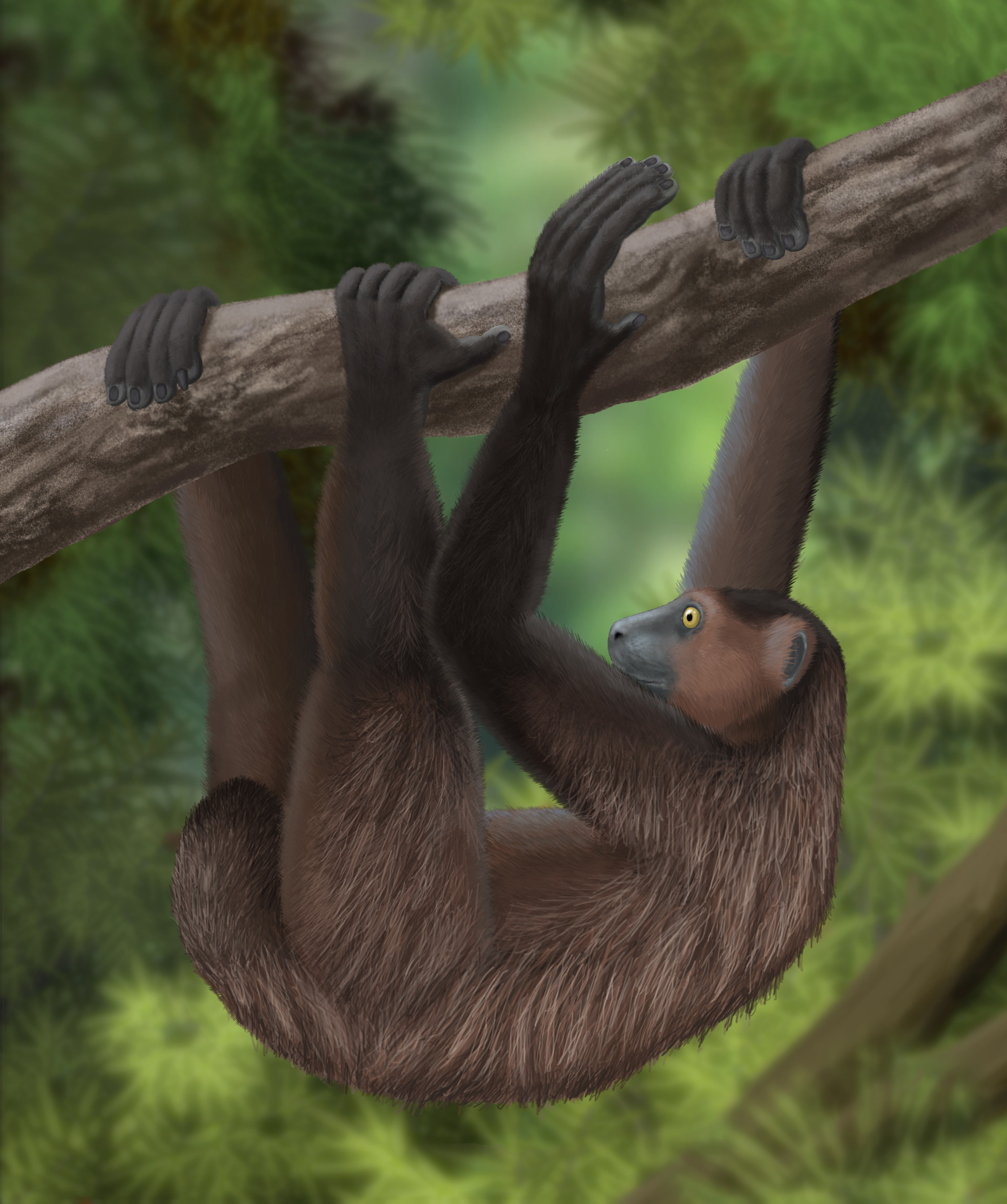
Restoration of Babakotia radofilai

Like all other lemurs, Babakotia radofilai was endemic to Madagascar. Its remains have only been found in limestone caves at the Ankarana Massif within the Ankarana Reserve and at Anjohibe, indicating a range across the extreme north and northwest of the island. The restricted range of this arboreal primate, particularly during a time when much of the island was blanketed in forest, might have been due to habitat specificity, competitive exclusion, or some other unknown factor. It was sympatric (occurred together) with Palaeopropithecus maximus and Mesopropithecus dolichobrachion.

Based on its size, the morphology of its molars, and microwear analysis on its teeth, Babakotia radofilai was likely a folivore, while supplementing its diet with fruit and hard seeds. In all sloth lemurs, including Babakotia radofilai, the permanent teeth erupted early, a trait seen in indriids that improves survivability of juveniles during the first dry season following weaning.

== Extinction ==
Because it died out relatively recently and is only known from subfossil remains, it is considered to be a modern form of Malagasy lemur. Babakotia radofilai lived during the Holocene epoch and is thought to have disappeared shortly after the arrival of humans to the island, possibly within the last 1,000 years. The only radiocarbon date that has been reported for it dates back to 3100–2800 BCE.
