= Charles Lamberton =

French paleontologist (1876–1960)

- Born: 23 April 1876; Jazeneuil, France
- Died: 8 October 1960 (aged 84); La Trinité, Alpes-Maritimes, France
- Monuments: Nesomys lambertoni; Brookesia lambertoni; Chamaeleo lambertoni
- Occupation: Paleontologist
- Years active: 1912–1956

Charles Lamberton (23 April 1876 – 8 October 1960) was a French paleontologist who lived and studied on the island of Madagascar between 1911 and 1948 and specialized in the recently extinct subfossil lemurs. He made significant contributions towards fixing misattributions of skeletal remains and poor interpretations of subfossil lemur behavior. His paleontological expeditions during the 1930s led to the discovery of a new species of Mesopropithecus, a type of sloth lemur. Three species—one mammal and two reptiles—were named after him, although one is now considered a taxonomic synonym.

== Career ==
Charles Lamberton lived on the island of Madagascar between 1911 and 1948, where he was employed as a Professor at Gallieni College and as a Secretary for the Malagasy Academy. During much of his career, which spanned from 1912 to 1956, he wrote extensively about the recently extinct, subfossil fauna of Madagascar.

For nearly 50 years, Lamberton studied the subfossil lemurs, a group of extinct, giant lemurs that died out shortly after the arrival of humans to the island. During the 1930s, Lamberton led several paleontological expeditions primarily to the southwest of Madagascar. In 1936, based on cranial remains he had discovered, Lamberton named and described a species of sloth lemur, Mesopropithecus globiceps, which he initially placed under another genus.

During the early 1900s, reconstructions of subfossil lemurs were poor interpretation due to misattributions of postcranial bones. Although other paleontologists had begun correcting misattributed bones and issues of synonymy, Lamberton fixed more misattributions and poor interpretations of subfossil lemur remains than any other paleontologist. In 1947, he correctly identified the postcranial remains of the sloth lemur, Palaeopropithecus, which Guillaume Grandidier had mistakenly attributed to a giant tree sloth he called Bradytherium. Ten years later, in 1957, he wrote a crushing rebuttal to Italian paleontologist Giuseppe Sera by pointing out many skeletal misattributions and tactfully refuting his misinterpretation of the koala lemur (Megaladapis) as a ray-like swimmer and his fancifully creative "arboreal-aquatic acrobat" theory for Palaeopropithecus. Both Lamberton and British paleontologist Alice Carleton showed that Palaeopropithecus was suspensory; however, Carleton proposed that Palaeopropithecus was sloth-like, while Lamberton predicted locomotion more similar to that of an orangutan. It wasn't until the late 1900s that subfossil discoveries demonstrated that Palaeopropithecus was more sloth-like.

Lamberton also corrected misattributions for Mesopropithecus made by Carleton, but did not fix earlier misattributions for the largest of the extinct lemurs, Archaeoindris. The errors with Archaeoindris were properly fixed in 1988.

In 1948, Lamberton established the name Pachylemur for an extinct type of giant ruffed lemur as a subgenus of the genus Lemur, which then contained all the species of the family Lemuridae. By 1979, Pachylemur was generally accepted as a valid genus. However, the name Pachylemur had nomenclatural problems relating to the Principle of Homonymy, the Principle of Priority, and Lamberton's failure to select a type species. These problems could potentially render the name unavailable under the rules of zoological nomenclature. To conserve the name Pachylemur, Jelle Zijlstra, Colin Groves, and Alex Dunkel submitted a petition to the International Commission on Zoological Nomenclature in 2011.

== Honors ==
Three species are named after Lamberton: the western red forest rat (Nesomys lambertoni) of western Madagascar, Lamberton's baboon tarantula (Monocentropus lambertoni), and the Fito leaf chameleon (Brookesia lambertoni). The taxonomic synonym for the carpet chameleon (Furcifer lateralis), Chamaeleo lambertoni Angel, 1921, was also named after Lamberton.
