= William L. Jungers =

American anthropologist

William L. Jungers (17 November 1948 – 2023) was an American anthropologist, Distinguished Teaching Professor and the Chair of the Department of Anatomical Sciences at State University of New York at Stony Brook on Long Island, New York. He is best known for his work on the biomechanics of bipedal locomotion in hominids such as the 3.4-million-year-old Lucy (Australopithecus afarensis), and the 6.1- to 5.8-million-year-old Millennium Man Orrorin tugenensis. He devoted much of his career to the study of the lemurs of Madagascar, especially giant extinct subfossil forms such as Megaladapis. More recently, Jungers has been a subject of media attention due to his analysis of the remains of Homo floresiensis, which he believed to be legitimate members of a newly discovered species based on remains of the shoulder, the wrist, and the feet.

== Early life ==
Jungers was born in Palacios, Texas and spent part of his childhood in that area. He excelled academically from an early age and graduated as one of several valedictorians of his 1966 Streator Township High School class. Standing 6'4" tall, he was also an accomplished basketball player throughout his high school career. Following graduation, he attended Oberlin College for his undergraduate education where he was involved in the liberal political and social culture of the late 1960s. He later received his PhD in anthropology from the University of Michigan in 1976 at the age of 26 under the advisorship of Frank Livingstone, Milford Wolpoff and C. Loring Brace. He was hired shortly thereafter at the University of Illinois but moved in 1978 to the State University of New York at Stony Brook Department of Anatomical Sciences, where he has remained throughout the course of his career.

== Scholarly life ==
Jungers was an expert in biomechanics, and has edited an important reference work on primate allometry in particular. His work concerning the extinct subfossil lemurs focused on their initial isolation in the virtually predator-free environment of Madagascar, their subsequent adaptive radiation, and the unusual morphological and behavioral diversity that resulted as a consequence. He has worked on hominid bipedalism being due to the unique muscular and skeletal constraints required for locomotion in humans and their ancestors, and the apparently ancient anatomy of the recent "hobbit" fossils, possibly influenced by insular dwarfism. By the end of 2009 Jungers had written more than 150 peer-reviewed articles about the relationship between form and function in many primate species, both extinct and extant.

== Awards ==
- Phi Beta Kappa (Oberlin College)
- Alfred P. Sloan Scholar, Oberlin College (1966–1970)
- Comfort-Starr Award in Sociology-Anthropology, Oberlin College (1970)
- Danforth Foundation Graduate Fellow (1971–1975)
- Rackham Graduate School Fellowship, University of Michigan (1976)
- Aescupalius Award in Recognition of Outstanding Teaching, SBU (1994)
- Dean's Award for Excellence in Graduate Mentoring, SBU (2002)
- Excellence in Teaching Award - SOM (1986, 1990, 1992, 1994, 2000, 2001, 2003, 2004)
- President's Award for Excellence in Teaching (2006–2007)
- Chancellor's Award for Excellence in Teaching (2006–2007)
