= Retinal summation =

Convergence of signalling in the retina

Retinal summation describes the relationship between different types of cells in the retina: cone photoreceptor cells, bipolar cells, and ganglion cells. With high retinal summation, a large number of photoreceptor cells converge on a smaller number of bipolar cells in transferring their signals to ganglion cells. Zero summation occurs when each cone photoreceptor cell contacts a single ganglion cell via a single bipolar cell.

High summation increases sensitivity to light at the expense of visual acuity. Low retinal summation results in high visual acuity, with individual photoreceptor cells sending their own signals. High retinal summation yields high sensitivity to low light levels, where the signal is summed before reaching the brain—presumably advantageous when the signals reaching individual photoreceptor cells are weak.

High retinal summation is an adaptation to low light levels, and low retinal summation to high light levels (thus sharpening the images).
