= Herbert F. Standing =

English paleontologist (1857–1943)

- Born: Herbert Fox Standing; 5 July 1857; Crawley, Sussex
- Died: 24 December 1943 (aged 86); Durban, South Africa
- Monuments: Phelsuma standingi
- Occupations: Medical missionary Paleontologist; Author
- Years active: unknown
- Notable work: The Children of Madagascar (1887)

Herbert Fox Standing (5 July 1857 – 24 December 1943) was an English paleontologist and Quaker medical missionary in Madagascar. He was the author of the book The Children of Madagascar (1887) and the Headmaster of the Boys' High School of the Friends' Foreign Mission Association in Antananarivo.

Standing is responsible for describing four species of subfossil lemur, including Archaeoindris fontoynontii (1909), Mesopropithecus pithecoides (1905), Palaeopropithecus maximus (1903), Megaladapis grandidieri (1903), and other subfossil taxa that have since become taxonomic synonyms. Standing's day gecko (Phelsuma standingi) is named after him.

Standing married Lucy Glynn in 1881. They had seven children.
