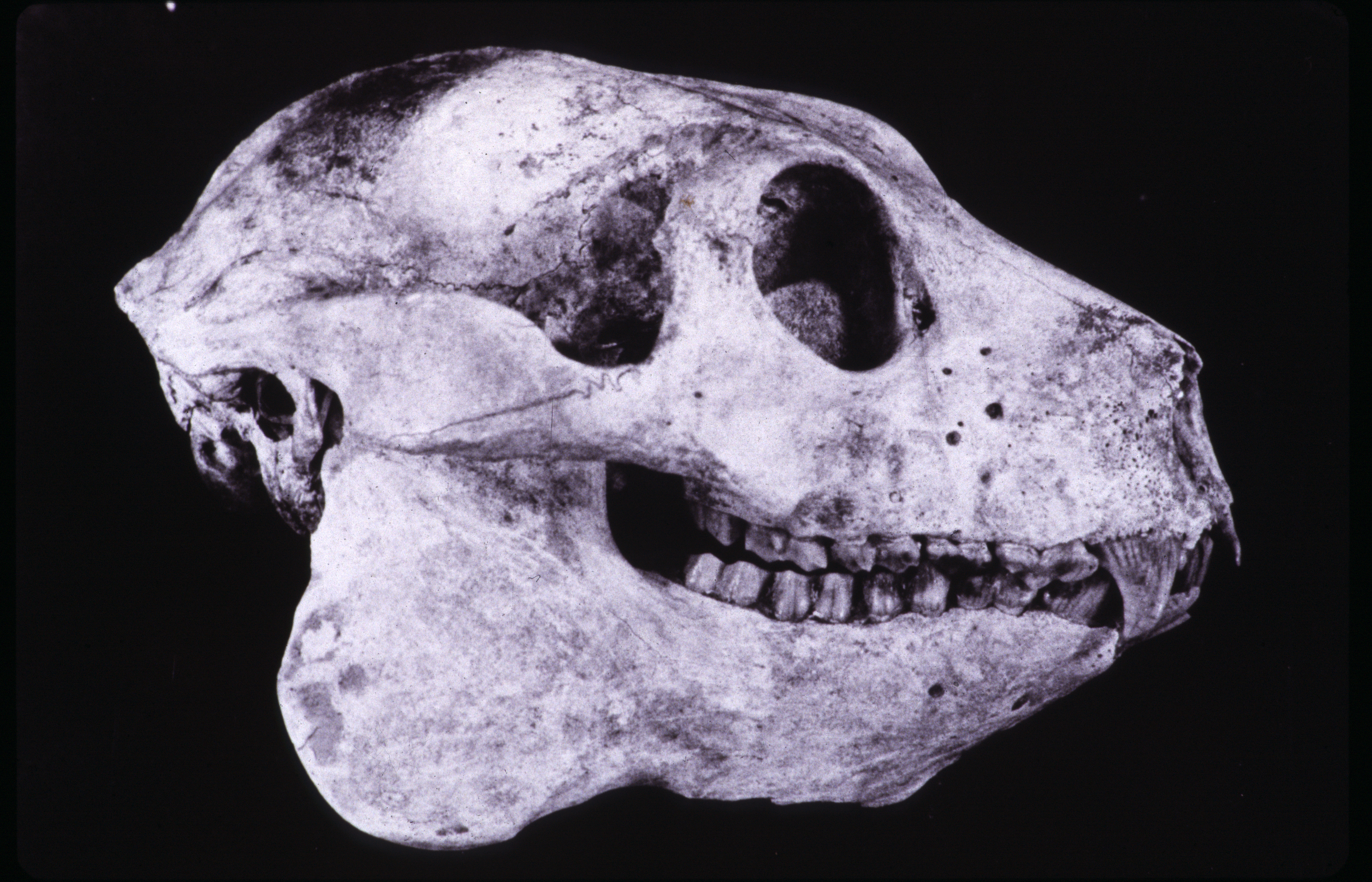
- Babakotia radofilai skull

Scientific classification
- Kingdom: Animalia
- Phylum: Chordata
- Class: Mammalia
- Order: Primates
- Suborder: Strepsirrhini
- Superfamily: Lemuroidea
- Family: †Palaeopropithecidae; Tattersall, 1973

Genera
- †Archaeoindris; †Babakotia; †Mesopropithecus; †Palaeopropithecus

= Sloth lemur =

Sloth lemur Temporal range: Pleistocene–Northgrippian

Extinct family of lemurs

The sloth lemurs (Palaeopropithecidae) comprise an extinct family of lemurs that includes four genera. The common name can be misleading, as members of Palaeopropithecidae were not closely related to sloths. This clade has been dubbed the ‘‘sloth lemurs’’ because of remarkable postcranial convergences with South American sloths. Despite postcranial similarities, the hands and feet show significant differences. Sloths possess long, curved claws, while sloth lemurs have short, flat nails on their distal phalanges like most primates.

== Diet ==
Members of the family Palaeopropithecidae appear to have eaten a mix of fruit, nuts, and foliage. The sloth lemurs were mixed-feeders rather than specialized browsers who ate a mixed diet based on seasonality. On the basis of highly robust mandible, Palaeopropithecus and Archaeoindris can be considered highly folivorous. The family Palaeopropithecidae exhibited molar megadonty, small deciduous teeth with low occlusal length ratios, and a decoupling of the speed of dental and body growth with acceleration of dental development relative to body growth. These attributes were observed in conjunction with the finding that Palaeopropithecidae experienced prolonged periods of gestation.

== Distribution and diversity ==
Postcranial measurements and anatomy suggest that three of the four genera, Palaeopropithecus, Babakotia, and Mesopropithecus were primarily arboreal and suspensory. The family was isolated due to river systems which formed a bio-geographical boundary, and likely attributed to the speciation of the family into four genera.

== Taxonomy ==
Traditionally the family Palaeopropithecidae has been considered most closely related to members of the extant family Indriidae based on morphology. Recently, DNA from extinct giant lemurs has confirmed this, as well as the fact that Malagasy primates in general share a common ancestor. The post-canine teeth of sloth lemurs are similar in number (two premolars, three molars) and general design to living indriids. Babakotia and Mesopropithecus preserve the typical indriid-like toothcomb, but Palaeopropithecus and Archaeoindris have replaced it with four short and stout teeth of unknown functional significance. The vertebrae formation supports the theory that three of the four genera were suspensory/arboreal, while Babakotia was more likely antipronograde.

Taxonomy of family Palaeopropithecidae
- Family Palaeopropithecidae
  - Archaeoindris
    - A. fontoynontii
  - Babakotia
    - B. radofilai
  - Mesopropithecus
    - M. dolichobrachion
    - M. globiceps
    - M. pithecoides
  - Palaeopropithecus
    - P. ingens
    - P. kelyus
    - P. maximus
Phylogeny of sloth lemurs and their closest relatives

- - †Archaeolemuridae
    - †Archaeolemur
    - †Hadropithecus
  - †Palaeopropithecidae
    - †Mesopropithecus
    - - †Babakotia
      - - †Palaeopropithecus
        - †Archaeoindris
  - Indriidae
    - Indri (indri)
    - Propithecus (sifakas)
    - Avahi (woolly lemurs)

== Extinction ==
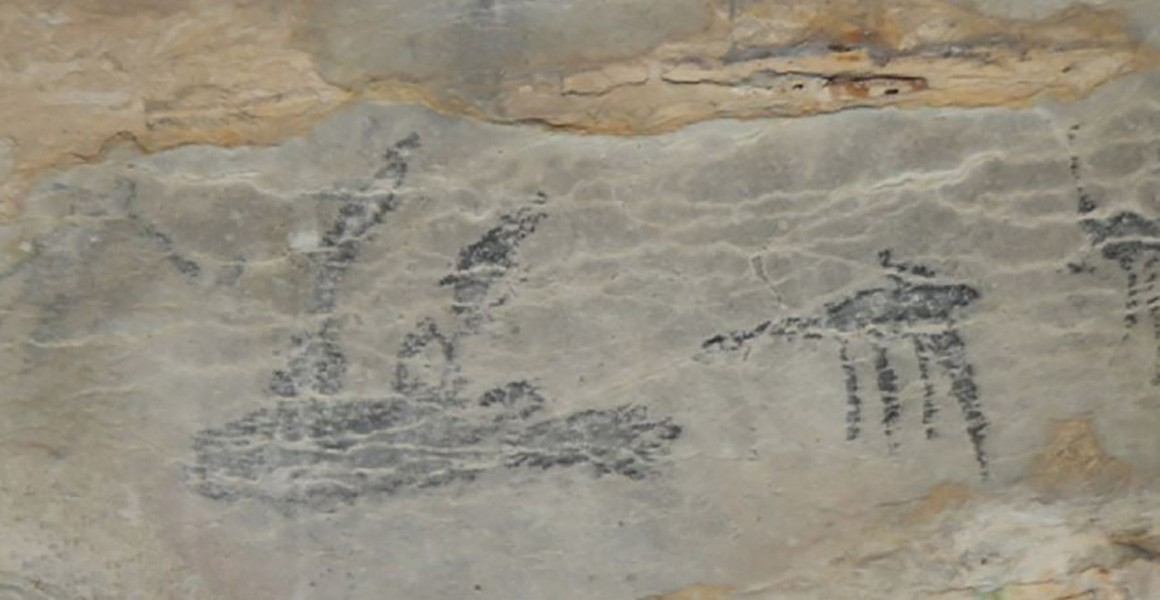
Hunting scene depicting a human (far left) and a sloth lemur (centre left) alongside two hunting dogs (right) from Andriamamelo Cave in western Madagascar

The extinction of Palaeopropithecus (as well as other giant lemurs) has been linked to climate change and the subsequent collapse of ecosystems that come with rapid climate shift. Recent findings also indicate that human hunting is partly responsible for the extinction of giant lemurs. It is likely not the only cause and cannot be applied to the entire island of Madagascar, but does explain patterns in certain regions of human settlement. Long bones have been discovered with cuts characteristic of butchering, either by dismembering and skinning or by filleting. Thorough scrutiny has led scientists to believe these marks to be from hunting by early humans.

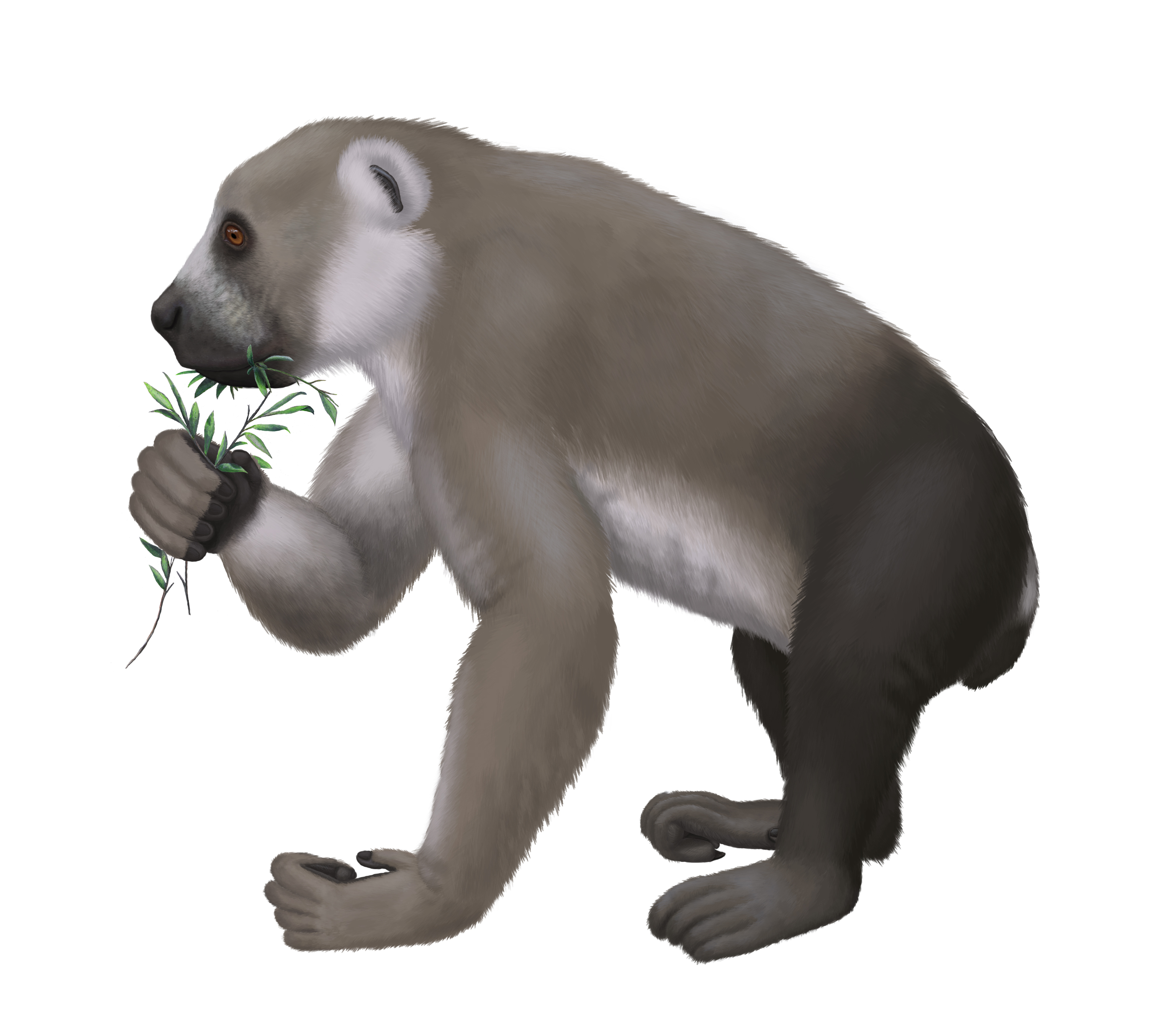
Archaeoindris fontoynonti

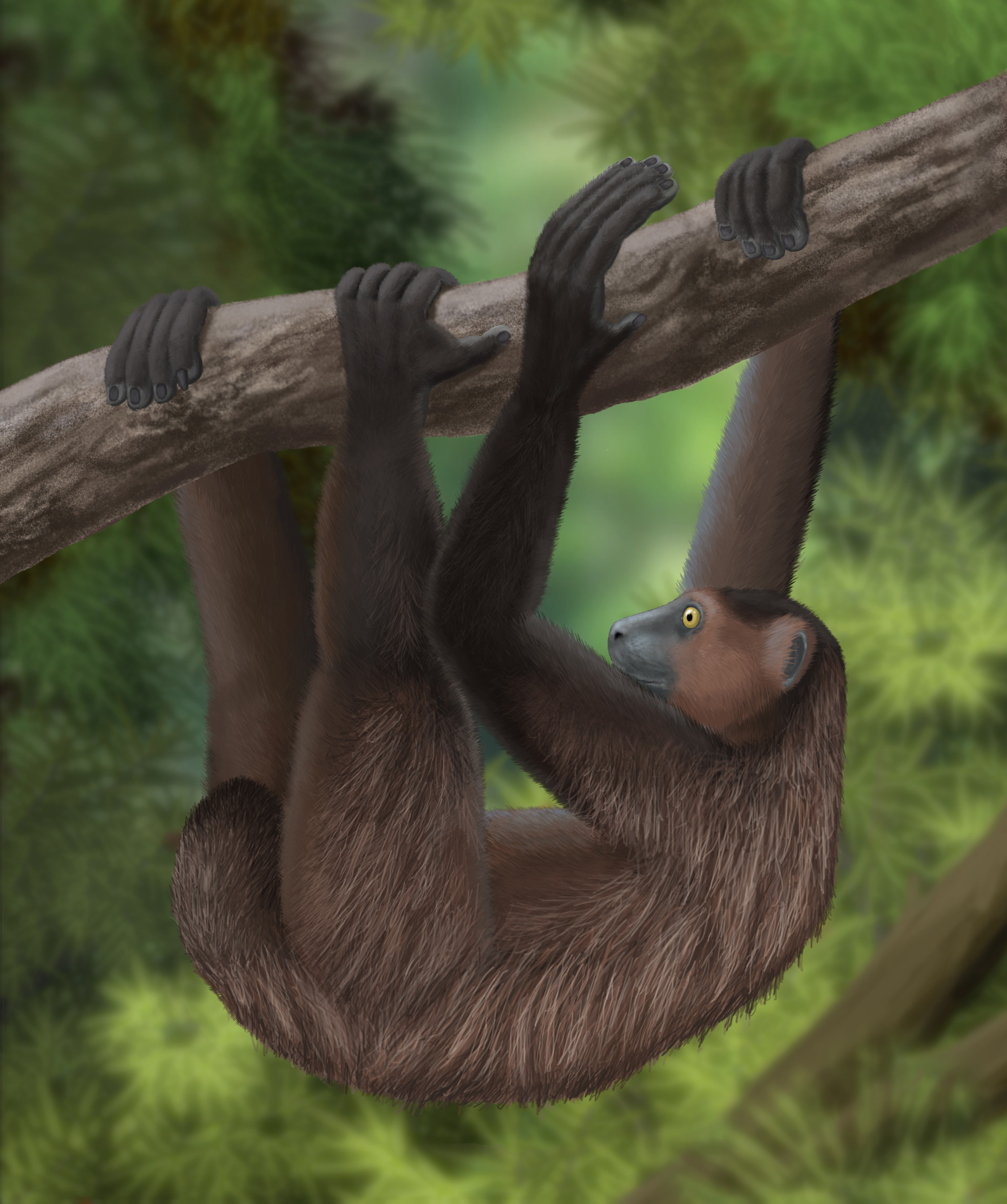
Babakotia radofilai

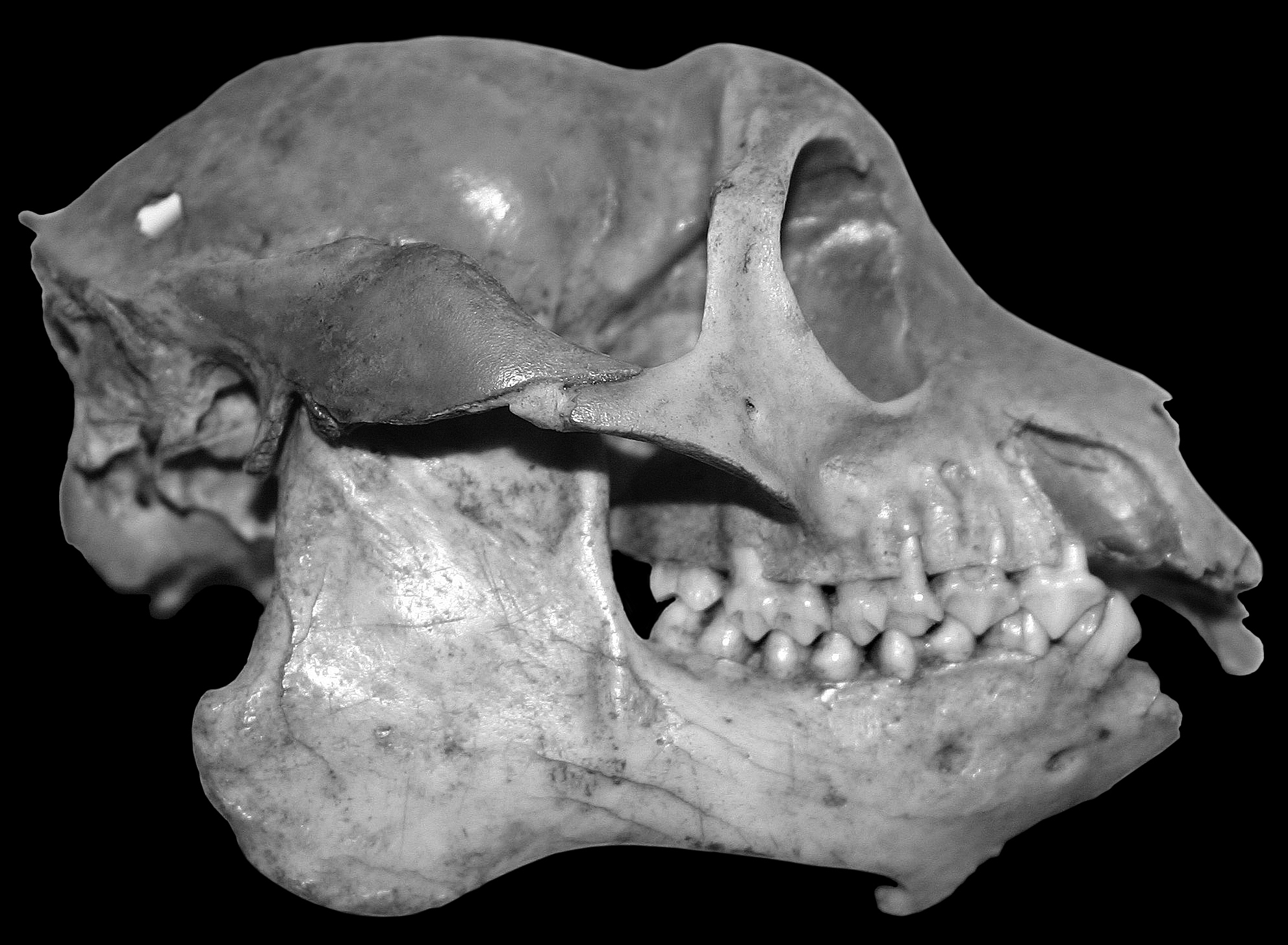
Mesopropithecus globiceps
