= Intermembral index =

The intermembral index is a ratio used to compare limb proportions, expressed as a percentage. It is equal to the length of forelimbs (humerus plus radius) divided by the length of the hind limbs (femur plus tibia) multiplied by 100, otherwise written mathematically as:

$\tfrac{(humerus+radius)}{(femur+tibia)} \times 100$

The intermembral index is used frequently in primatology, since it helps predict primate locomotor patterns. For scores lower than 100, the forelimbs are shorter than the hind limbs, which is common in leaping primates and bipedal hominids. Quadrupedal primates tend to have scores around 100, while brachiating primates have scores significantly higher than 100. This information can also be used to predict locomotion patterns for extinct primates in cases where forelimb and hind limb fossils have been found.

== Primate species ==
Intermembral Index of Extant Primate Species
Species	Intermembral Index
Cheirogaleus major	72
Microcebus murinus	72
Phaner furcifer	68
Lemur catta	70
Hapalemur griseus	64
Eulemur fulvus	72
Lepilemur edwardsi	60
Avahi laniger	58
Indri indri	64
Daubentonia madagascariensis	71
Galagoides demidovii	71
Galago senegalensis	52
Otolemur crassicaudatus	70
Perodicticus potto	88
Arctocebus calabarensis	89
Loris tardigradus	90
Nycticebus coucang	88
Carlito syrichta	58
Cephalopachus bancanus	52
Callicebus moloch	74
Pithecia pithecia	75
Chiropotes sagulatus	83
Cacajao calvus	83
Alouatta seniculus	97
Lagothrix lagotricha	98
Brachyteles arachnoides	104
Ateles paniscus	105
Cebus capucinus	81
Sapajus apella	81
Saimiri sciureus	80
Aotus lemurinus	74
Callimico goeldii	69
Callithrix jacchus	76
Cebuella pygmaea	83
Saguinus geoffroyi	76
Leontopithecus rosalia	89
Macaca fascicularis	93
Macaca nemestrina	98
Cercocebus agilis	84
Mandrillus sphinx	95
Lophocebus albigena	78
Papio anubis	97
Theropithecus gelada	100
Miopithecus talapoin	83
Chlorocebus aethiops	83
Erythrocebus patas	92
Allochrocebus lhoesti	80
Cercopithecus mitis	82
Colobus guereza	79
Piliocolobus badius	87
Procolobus verus	80
Presbytis siamensis	78
Trachypithecus obscurus	83
Semnopithecus entellus	83
Nasalis larvatus	94
Pygathrix nemaeus	94
Hylobates lar	130
Symphalangus syndactylus	147
Nomascus concolor	140
Hoolock hoolock	129
Pongo pygmaeus	139
Pan troglodytes	106
Pan paniscus	102
Gorilla gorilla	116
Homo sapiens	72

== Variation ==
In a diverse ethnic sample of 314 modern human skeletons covering African Pygmies, Andaman Islanders, Khoesan, Zulu, African Americans, Sami and Inuit the intermembral index was found to vary between 64 and 74. A study published in 1937 found a range of variation between 64.5 and 79.2. This study found no link with humans of different groups with individuals from different ethnic groups showing similar scatter of variation. Variation has also been found in chimapanzees (100.1 - 113.7), gorillas (110.3 - 125.0), orangutan (135.0 -150.9), siamang (145.0 - 155.2), gibbon (120.5 - 137.1), and macque monkeys (83.0 - 91.0).
