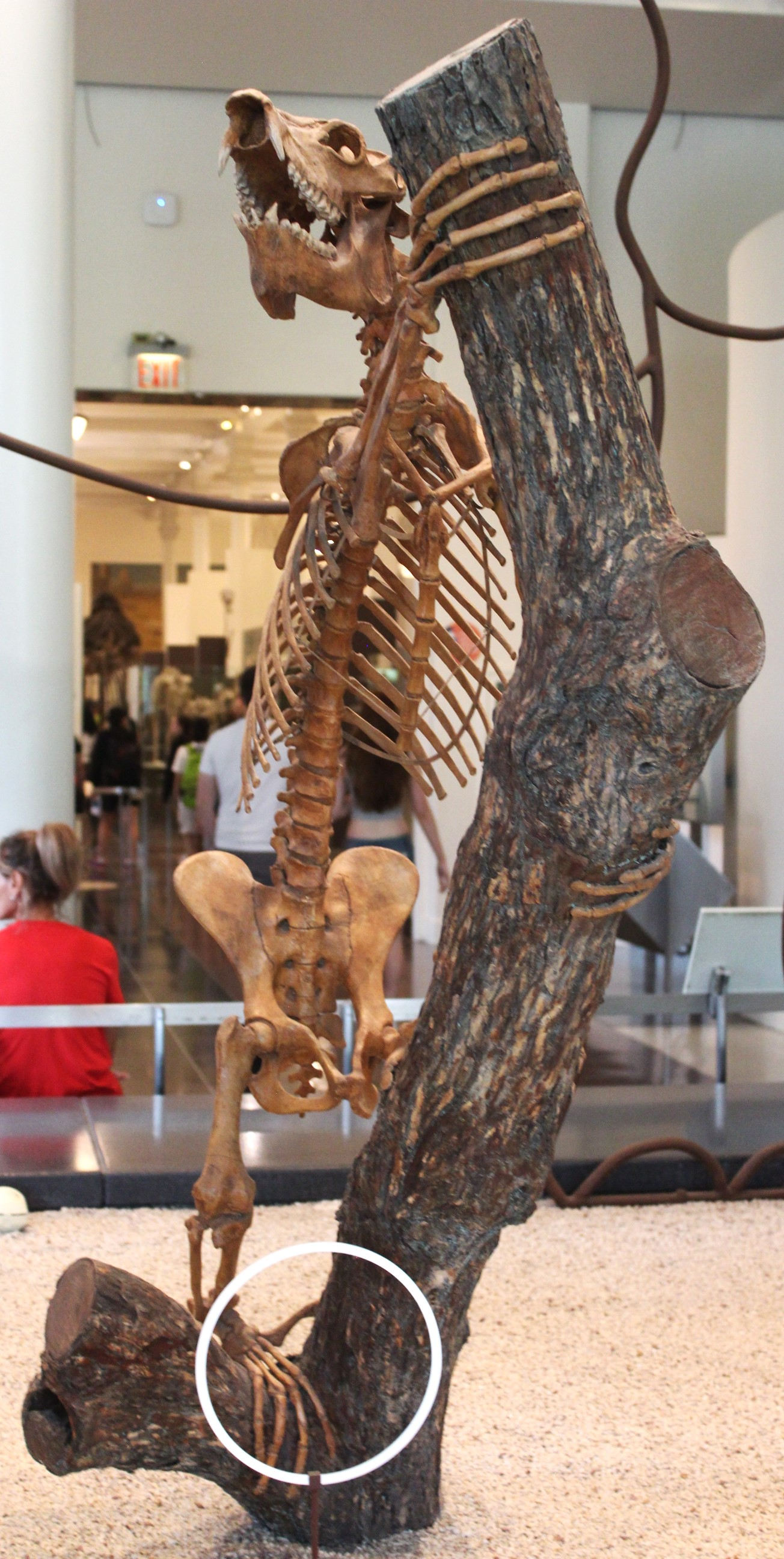
- Megaladapis edwardsi skeleton

Conservation status
- Extinct (1280–1420 CE)

Scientific classification
- Kingdom: Animalia
- Phylum: Chordata
- Class: Mammalia
- Infraclass: Placentalia
- Order: Primates
- Suborder: Strepsirrhini
- Superfamily: Lemuroidea
- Family: †Megaladapidae; Forsyth Major, 1894
- Genus: †Megaladapis; Forsyth Major, 1894

Type species
- Megaladapis madagascariensis Forsyth Major, 1894

Species
- Subgenus Peloriadapis: †M. edwardsi (G. Grandidier, 1899); Subgenus Megaladapis: †M. madagascariensis Forsyth Major, 1894; †M. grandidieri Standing, 1903

= Megaladapis =

Megaladapis Temporal range: Pleistocene-Holocene

Extinct genus of lemurs

Megaladapis, informally known as the koala lemur, is an extinct genus of lemurs belonging to the family Megaladapidae, consisting of three species that once inhabited the island of Madagascar. The largest measured between 1.3 to 1.5 m (4 to 5 ft) in length.

== Description ==
Megaladapis was quite different from any living lemur. Its body was squat and built like that of the modern koala. Its long arms, fingers, feet, and toes were specialized for grasping trees, and its legs were splayed for vertical climbing. The morphology of its foot suggests Megaladapis evolved to live in an arboreal environment, having a large hallux and lateral abductor musculature that helped it to grasp vertically on trees. These features are shared by other arboreal species. The hands and feet were curved and the ankles and wrists did not have the usual stability needed to travel on the ground that most other lemurids have.

Its body weight reached 140 kg (310 lb). Other estimates suggest 46.5–85.1 kg (103–188 lb) but it is still much larger than any extant lemur. It had the largest body size of any lemur, with double the body mass of the next largest extinct lemur.

=== Cranial anatomy ===
The shape of its skull was unique among all known primates, with a nasal region which showed similarities to those of rhinoceros, a feature that probably combined with an enlarged upper lip for grasping leaves. Its head was unlike that of any other primate; most strikingly, its eyes were on the sides of its skull, instead of forward on the skull as in all other primates. An endocast of its skull showed that it had a brain capacity of about 250 cc (8.8 imp fl oz; 8.5 US fl oz), about 3 to 4 times the size of a domestic cat's, which is small for its size when compared to other lemurs. Compared to the size of the skull, the diameter of the orbits protrudes outwards and forwards in a tabular form, suggesting that Megaladapis was diurnal.

Details about the anterior parts of the dentition, such as the canines and incisors, are difficult to determine. The bulle osseve are broken away. The foremost facial portion and base of the skull is also wanting. The total length of the skull of M. madagascariensis has been calculated to be about 250 mm (9.8 in), about from three to four times that of a domestic cat. Based on the wear on the teeth, the obliteration of most of the sutures of the very thick bones, and the strongly developed crests, it is believed to have been an elderly individual.

There are several well-preserved fragments of the upper and lower jaw. The premaxillae of Megaladapis projected anteriorly and were likely associated with a proboscis, while its palate was very elongated. Its long canine teeth and cow-like jaw formed a tapering snout. Its jaw muscles were powerful for chewing the tough native vegetation. Megaladapis had no permanent upper incisors and lacked an expanded articular facet on the posterior face of the mandibular condyle. This diet and similar phenotypic traits of the teeth are the basis for concluding a shared ancestry with the Lepilemur. The upper molars of Lepilemur are very close in shape to those of Megaladapis. The main difference between the two is that the outer crown-surface of Lepilemur's molars forms a nearly straight line, almost parallel with the long axis of the skull, and the outer side is slightly concave inwards. The antero-internal cingulum is missing in the molars of Lepilemur.

== Biology ==
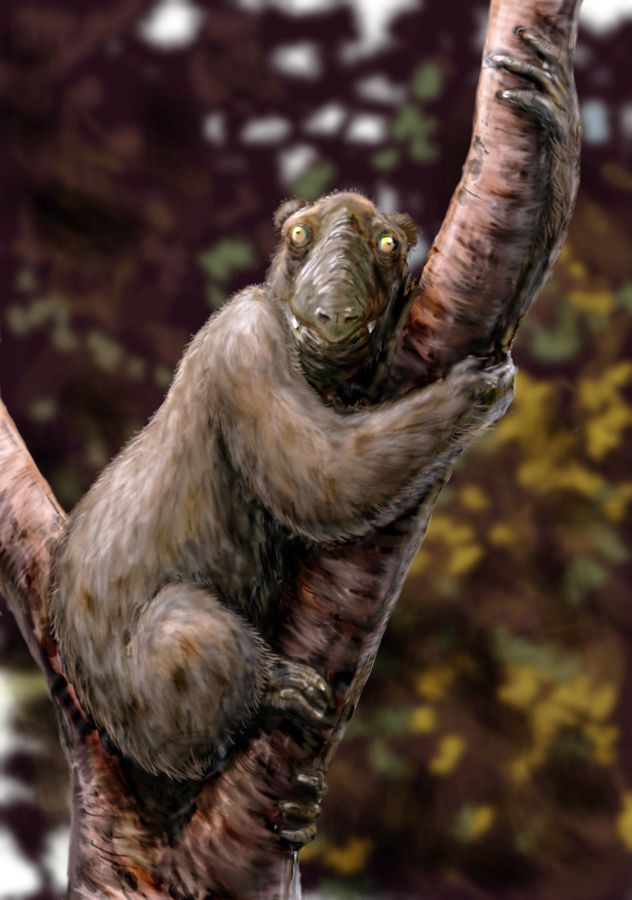
Restoration of Megaladapis edwardsi

The island's topography was always changing, and like other lemurs, Megaladapis was specialized within its own niche. The general expectations of tree climbers such as Megaladapis is that with an increase in size, the body's forelimbs will also increase proportionally.

The diet of Megaladapis might be the factor that influences the dental development; species with a larger brain, later initiation of molar crowns, and longer formation of crown are considered to have more of an omnivorous diet. In contrast, Megaladapis lived on a folivorous diet, despite having a smaller brain, early initiation of molar crowns, and fast crown formation. Based on the patterns of its dental microwear, M. edwardsi is believed to have been exclusively folivorous, being termed a "hyperfolivore". The other two species, M. madagascariensis and M. grandidieri, were also predominantly folivorous but had a more variable diet. Megaladapis fed using a leaf-cropping foraging method. Dental caries has been documented to have occurred in M. madagascariensis, which is a finding consistent with its folivorous diet that would have been highly cariogenic.

Megaladapis were diurnal, or active during the day. Lemurs in general had small group sizes and were highly seasonal breeders (they breed for about one to two weeks a year), which is assumed to be the case for Megaladapis.

Based on when molar crown initiation occurred, Megaladapis's gestation period is thought to have been at least 198 days, but was likely longer.

== Extinction ==
When humans arrived on Madagascar 2,300 years ago, there were at least 17 species of now-extinct "giant" lemur, in addition to the species alive today. Their seasonal breeding and long gestation times, resulting in low breeding rates, coupled with their diurnality and presumed slow movement were disadvantageous in this new ecological context; Megaladapis (along with the other species of giant lemur) were more susceptible to new predators (humans), forest fires, and habitat destruction due to these traits.

Over-hunting by humans was deemed a major contributor to the extinction of "giant" lemurs. Minor droughts are frequent in Madagascar, but a major drought approximately 1000 years ago significantly lowered water levels in lakes, caused a severe vegetation transition, and created conditions suitable for wildfires in grasslands and savannas. Crop failures due to these conditions would drive inhabitants to hunt for bushmeat to survive, and these giant lemurs were an easy source of said meat. Some exterior scratches and incisions were found on both the metatarsus and mandibula of Megaladapis fossils. The cuts on the metatarsus are comparable to those found in caves and are thought to have been produced by humans, while those on the mandibula seem to have been produced by some instrument engineered for cutting – indications that the Megaladapis was at some point in direct contact with the anatomically-modern humans of its time.

The landscape in which giant lemurs were found were largely forested areas with dense vegetation. Almost directly after human arrival, there was a rapid decline in the spores of the coprophilous fungus Sporormiella, which indicates a decrease in megafaunal biomass. Charcoal microparticles being found in surveys of various areas in Madagascar give evidence to the fact that human habitat modification only occurred after this decline in megafaunal biomass. Charcoal deposits provide evidence to the fact that humans used fire to clear large pieces of land very rapidly. The habitats that Megaladapis were well-adapted to live in were converted into grasslands, which provided little to no cover from outside forces for these creatures. Thus, the final decline of "giant" lemur populations, including Megaladapis, were hypothesized to be due to habitat fragmentation through human activities (for example, clearing of land through "slash-and-burn" techniques), resulting in the extinction of these lemurs between 500 and 600 years ago.

== Cultural references ==
It is often believed that Malagasy legends of the tretretretre or tratratratra, an extinct animal, refer to Megaladapis, but the details of these tales, notably the "human-like" face of the animal, match the related Palaeopropithecus much better.

== Gallery ==
Images of Megaladapis
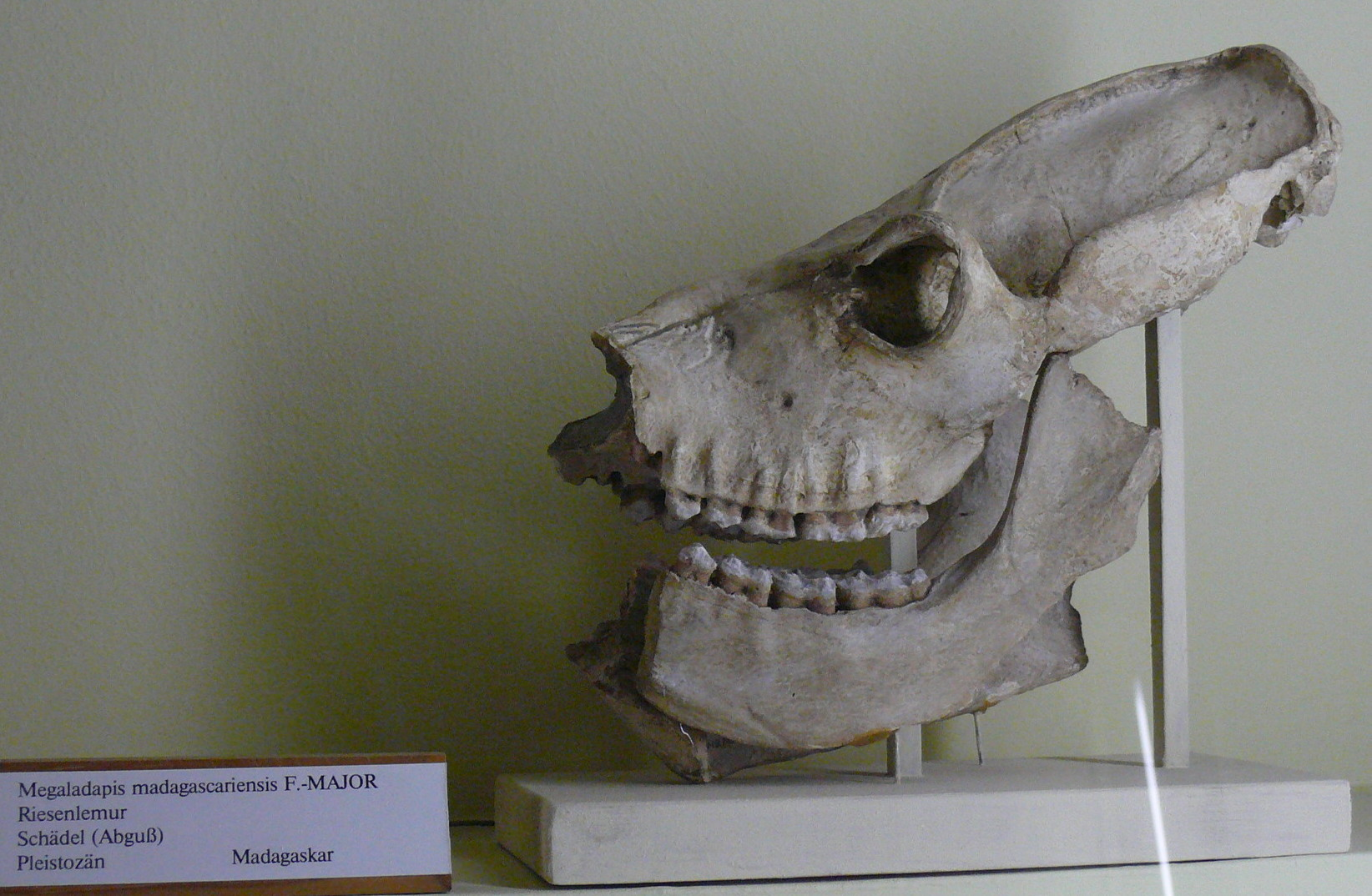
Skull of M. madagascariensis.

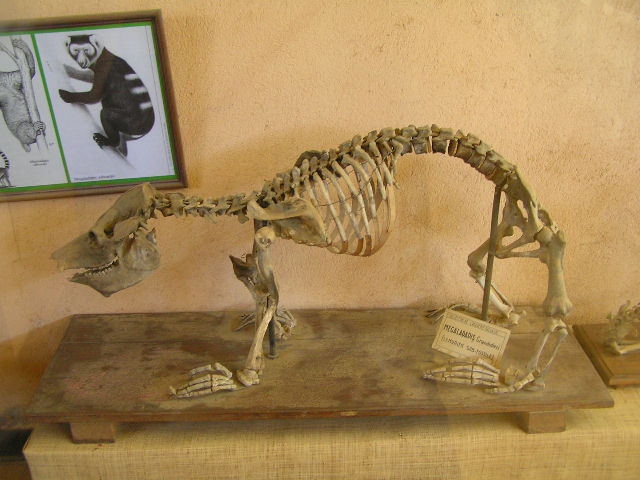
M. grandidieri skeleton

Inaccurate 1902 life restoration of M. madagascariensis
