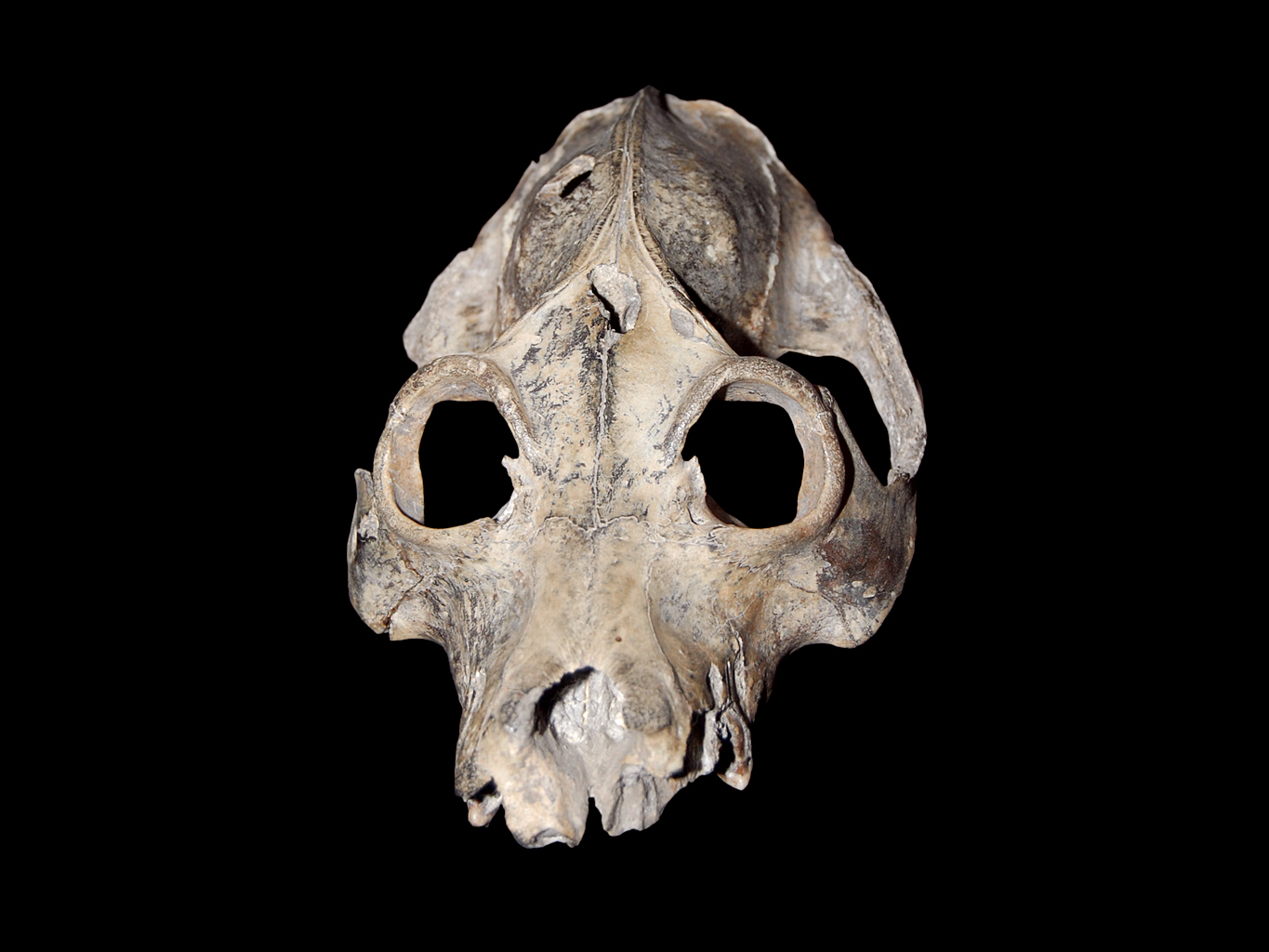
- Front view of P. maximus skull

Conservation status
- Extinct (1620) (IUCN 3.1) (P. ingens)

Scientific classification
- Kingdom: Animalia
- Phylum: Chordata
- Class: Mammalia
- Infraclass: Placentalia
- Order: Primates
- Suborder: Strepsirrhini
- Family: †Palaeopropithecidae
- Genus: †Palaeopropithecus; G. Grandider, 1899

Type species
- Palaeopropithecus ingens G. Grandidier, 1899

Species
- †P. ingens G. Grandider, 1899; †P. maximus Standing, 1903; †P. kelyus Gommery et al., 2009
- Subfossil sites for Palaeopropithecus red=P. kelyus; green=P. ingens; blue=P. maximus

= Palaeopropithecus =

Palaeopropithecus Temporal range: Quaternary

Extinct genus of lemurs

Palaeopropithecus is a recently extinct genus of large sloth lemurs from Madagascar related to living lemur species found there today. Three species are known, Palaeopropithecus ingens, P. maximus, and P. kelyus. Radiocarbon dates indicate that they may have survived until around 1300–1620 CE. Malagasy legends of the tretretretre or tratratratra are thought to refer to P. ingens.

Evidence suggests a solely arboreal lifestyle with frequent upside down suspension, hence the name sloth lemur.

== Anatomy ==
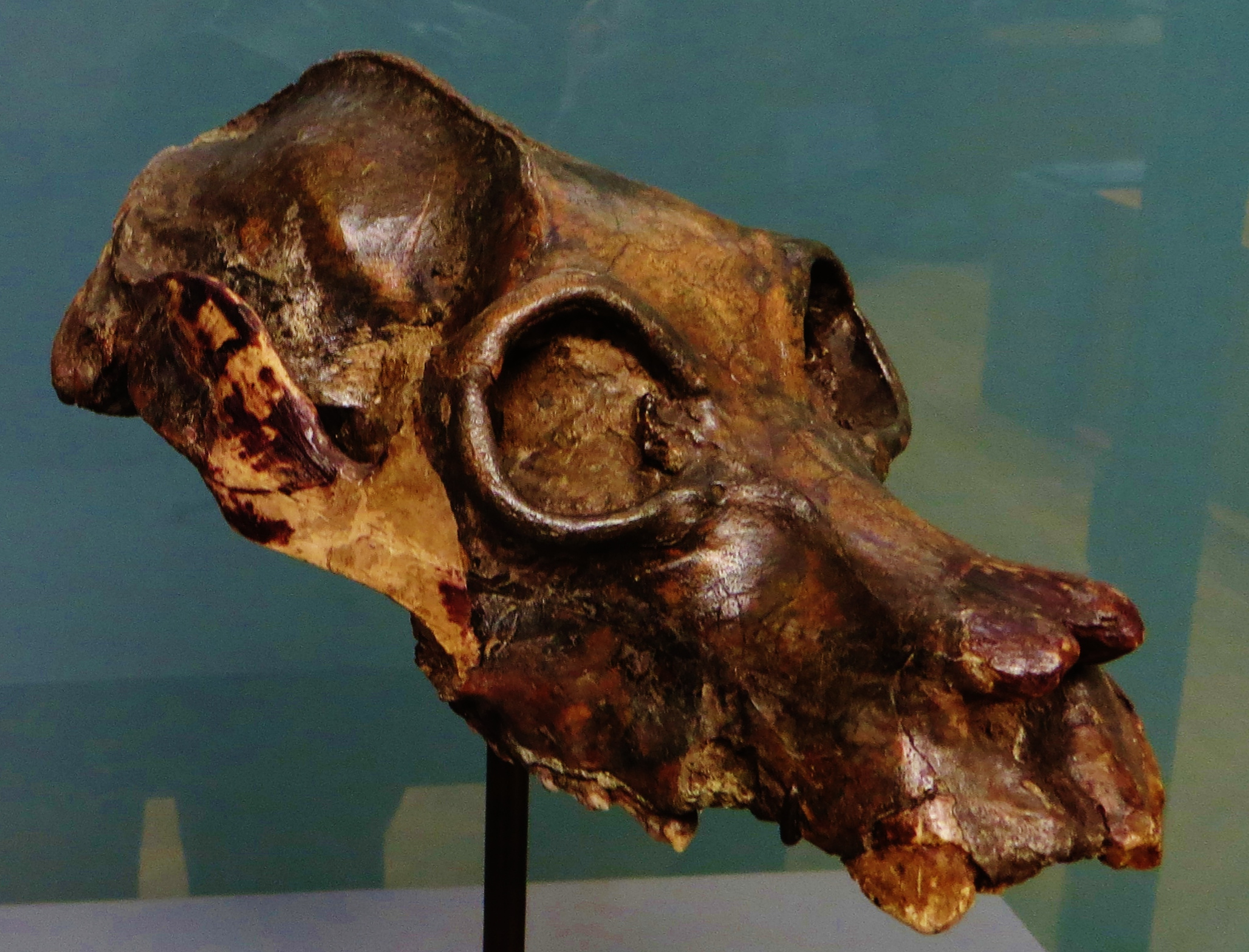
P. maximus skull (National Museum of Natural History, Paris).

Palaeopropithecus primarily lived in the trees to stay away from predators as well as to gain valuable resources. To survive properly in the trees, Palaeopropithecus had long and powerful arms and legs, each with significantly long fingers and toes to allow them to hang upside down on branches. These were used to swing from branch to branch to travel across the jungle of Madagascar. These long arms made it much easier to grab hold of various trees and branches, making travel at the arboreal level easier. Laurie Godrey states in "The Extinct Sloth Lemurs of Madagascar", "Thus, these animals exhibit the odd behavioral combination of being both specialized leapers and adept climbers and hangers." The long arms of Palaeopropithecus had hook like extremities on their hands and feet. This benefited Palaeopropithecus by enabling them to hook their bodies onto the foliage to stabilize themselves as they traversed through the trees. Palaeopropithecus on average weighed between 100 pounds (45 kg)-120 pounds (54 kg). This weight is heavier than most modern lemurs and could potentially have caused the species to fall while hanging on branches, forcing the species to make sufficient use of their long arms and legs to survive. Palaeopropithecus eating habits were different from those of modern lemurs. The teeth of Palaeoprophithecus indicate that the animal was folivorous to eat leaves and tougher so they can eat hard foods such as nuts and seeds. This helped them fill out a generalized niche where they had multiple food resources to rely on.

The anatomy of their bones were generally curved with a sixty-degree bend on major bones in the legs and arms. These bones were much denser than normal and with the addition of the curved structure of the bones it allowed Palaeopropithecus an easier capability to swing from branch to branch. This "curvature indicates that the sloth lemurs are one of the most suspensory clades of mammals ever to evolve. The curved bones also helped them gain more torque and speed, allowing them to reach branches at great distances. The relatively small body of Palaeopropithecus, while large compared to the modern lemur, had a great degree curve because it was smaller in stature. There is an inverse relationship between the bigger the animal and the smaller the bone degree curve.

Biomechanical theory suggests that bone curvature in Palaeopropithecus hand bones is linked to the functional demands of the organism's environment. This is because curved phalanges, such as the phalanges of Palaeopropithecus, are commonly associated with the gripping function needed to survive in an arboreal habitat.

== Diet ==
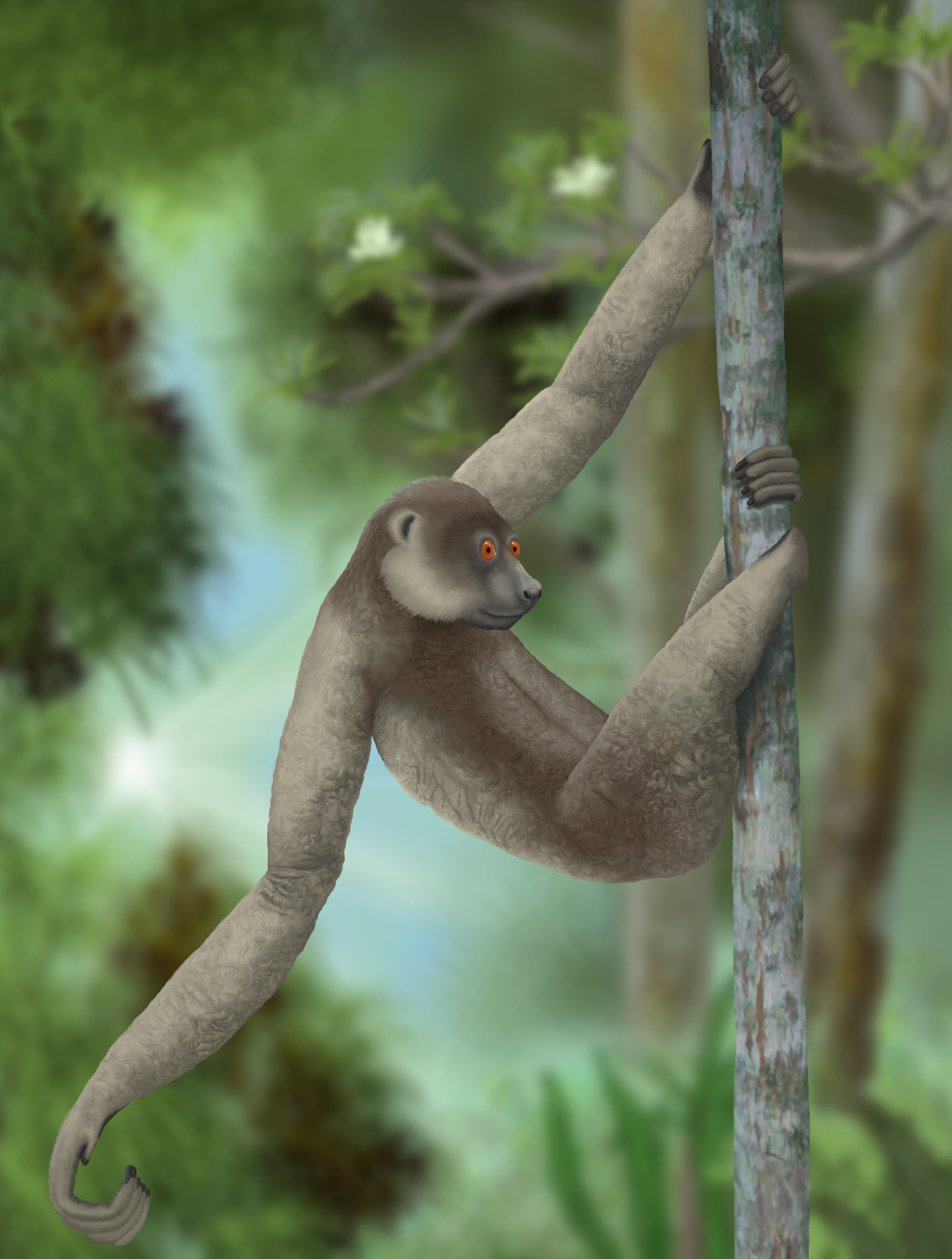
Artist's reconstruction of Palaeopropithecus ingens

The Palaeopropithecus species were probably folivorous based on dental morphology, consuming a mixed diet of foliage and fruit to varying degrees. They supplemented their leaf-eating with substantial amounts of seed-predation, much like modern indrids. There is also no molar use wear evidence that Palaeopropithecus relied on terrestrial foods (C4 grasses, tubers, rhizomes).

P. ingens faced weaning early on and lost their deciduous teeth early. After a little over a month they learned and were able to forage for solid food much earlier than other lemur species. More than likely P. ingens had to find food for themselves at an early age. The degree to how much of their diet consisted of seeds is somewhat uncertain but because of the pitting of the teeth it is clear they ate seeds. Palaeopropithecus ingens and P. maximus have similar use-wear scars. These were apparently mixed fruit and foliage consumers; neither species appears to have been a hard-object specialist.

P. kelyus had smaller teeth than the other two species. Its dental characteristics could be described from the P. kelyus subfossil maxilla fragmentshowing a parastyle and a highly developed mesostyle. While other Palaeopropithecus must have fed on leaves and fruit, the differences in the teeth of Palaeopropithecus kelyus suggest that this animal could chew much more food like nuts and seeds compared with the other two known species. Evidence is accumulating that they may survive on low quality (that is highly fibrous) staple or fallback foods and a life-history "strategy" of low maternal input and slow returns in an unpredictable and periodically stressful environment. Palaeopropithecus was the most suspensory of all known strepsirhines, and so they would feed in suspensory postures. Locomotion on the ground would have been ungainly, and probably quite rare, except to creep across the ground from one feeding tree to the next when presented with gaps in the forest canopy. Their large, hook-like claws were not optimal for walking.

== Behavior ==
Palaeopropithecus likely had a very active behavior based on the morphology of the limbs. It engaged in hanging upside down from all four limbs in a sloth-like posture at a high frequency, as indicated by the morphology of the lumbar vertebrae and the high degree of phalangeal curvature. It is regarded as being among the most suspensory clades of mammals ever to evolve.

== Extinction ==
When Palaeopropithecus became extinct is not exactly clear, however scientists have suggested that it could be as recent as about four hundred years ago. The reason behind the extinction of the several species of Palaeopropithecus has been attributed to the presence of humans to the island of Madagascar, the earliest evidence of which dates back to 2325±43 yr BP. Scientists have found fossils of Palaeopropithecus that appeared to have cut marks in them, suggesting flesh removal with a sharp object, indicating that the species was hunted by the earliest colonists to the island of Madagascar as a source for food. The first evidence of the early human butchery to Palaeopropithecus was found by Hon. Paul Ayshford Methuen, in 1911, who traveled to Madagascar expressly to collect bones of the extinct lemurs for the Oxford Museum. The slow locomotion habits of Palaeopropithecus likely made them an easy target for their human predators, who would consume them for food, as well as use the bones for tools. Along with being relatively large, these lemurs became targets because they were active during the day as were humans. Along with their diurnal nature, another factor that led to their extinction was a slow reproductive rate. They were killed faster than they could reproduce.

The introduction of humans to Madagascar brought change to an island that had yet to experience the lifestyles of human beings. Some believe that hunting was not the only problem brought to Madagascar by humans. There is a possibility that humans bringing over livestock may have affected some species. Although it would not have been disastrous, it could have finished off some species. Just a small amount of competition could offset the balance of an ecosystem.

Also, the introduction of man-made charcoal and fire to the island caused considerable damage to the forests where Palaeopropithecus lived and bred. Based on radiocarbon dating, it was found that Palaeopropithecus survived into the last millennium. While human intervention definitely damaged their populations and their habitats, the extinction of Palaeopropithecus occurred comparatively recently.

== Miscellaneous ==
There were three known species of Palaeopropithecus: Palaeopropithecus ingens, Palaeopropithecus maximus, and Palaeopropithecus kelyus. Palaeopropithecus ingens is thought to also be the mythical Malagasy creature known as the Tretretre, or the alternate name of Tratratra. According to new radiocarbon dates, Palaeopropithecus may have still been alive at 1500CE. However, Yale biologists who extracted DNA from the bones and teeth of 9 subfossil individuals from Palaeopropithecus state that all the giant lemurs analyzed died well over 1,000 years ago. Another thing they confirmed was that there is a close relationship between the sloth lemurs and currently living indrids. For example, Palaeopropithecus were born with highly developed teeth, just like indrids.
