= Madagascar Fauna and Flora Group =

Logo of MFG featuring the Aye-Aye

The Madagascar Fauna and Flora Group (MFG) is an international consortium of zoos and other conservation agencies which pool resources to help conserve animal species in Madagascar, through captive breeding programs, field research programs, training programs for rangers and wardens, and acquisition and protection of native habitat in Madagascar. It is a non-governmental organization working in conjunction with the Ministry of Water, Forests, and the Environment, Government of Madagascar. It is the organization behind the Save the Lemur campaign and is headquartered at the Saint Louis Zoo.

== Origins ==
The organization was formed in response to a plea by the Government of Madagascar to the international zoo community in 1987 to help conserve species and habitat in Madagascar and provide training and know-how for such activities. The plea was made at a meeting held at St. Catherines Island, Georgia, United States. Convened by the Wildlife Conservation Society and the Conservation Breeding Specialist Group of the International Union for Conservation of Nature, it was attended by the Durrell Wildlife Conservation Trust (then Jersey Wildlife Preservation Trust) headed by Gerald Durrell, Parc Zoologique et Botanique de Mulhouse, the Strasborg consortium, the Duke Lemur Center, and several US zoos. These institutions became the founding members of the group when it was formalized in 1988. As of August 2021, the organization has 30 member institutions. The two logos of the organization sport two of Madagascar's oft championed species for conservation – the ruffed lemur and the aye-aye.

== Goals ==
Logo for the Save the Lemur campaign, featuring a ruffed lemur

The six major goals of the MFG, as outlined in their mission statement, are:

- Providing training and support at Parc Ivoloina, Madagascar's premier zoological park and resort. Support includes outreach and educational programs, and veterinary support.
- Protection of National Parks and Wildlife Reserves, notably the Betampona Reserve, where the MFG have started the re-introduction of captive-bred ruffed lemurs into the wild.
- Promoting and funding field work pertaining to Madagascar fauna, flora and habitat. Cases in point are the side-necked turtle, the Malagasy pond heron and a range of lemur species.
- Managing captive breeding programs for Madagascar species in and outside Madagascar, co-ordinating amongst the various member organizations.
- Planning conservation goals in conjunction with the Madagascar National Parks Association
- Educating zoo visitors worldwide about Madagascar's biological heritage

Among their campaigns is Save the Lemur, a drive to raise funds and generate awareness about the plight of lemur species in Madagascar.
