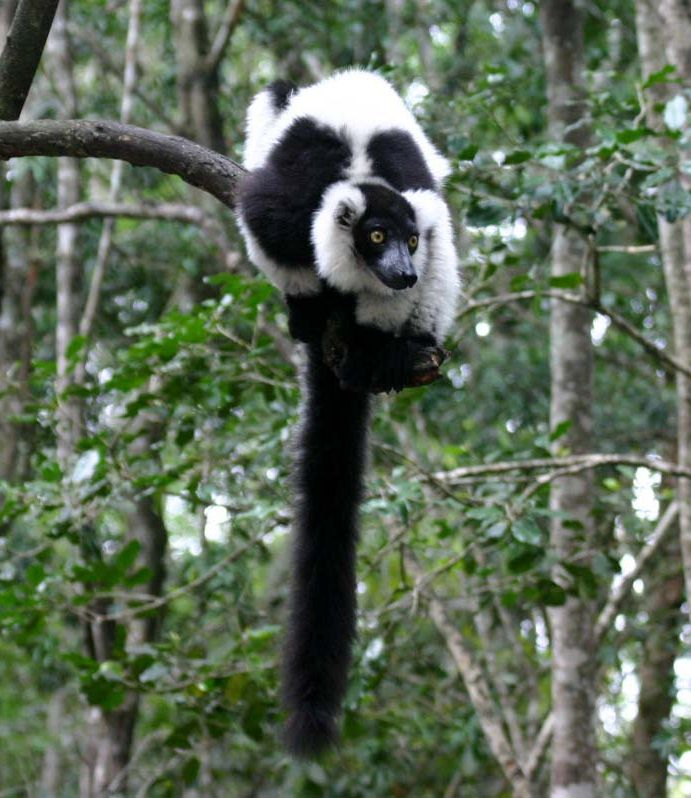
- Black-and-white ruffed lemur (Varecia variegata)

Conservation status
- CITES Appendix I

Scientific classification
- Kingdom: Animalia
- Phylum: Chordata
- Class: Mammalia
- Order: Primates
- Suborder: Strepsirrhini
- Family: Lemuridae
- Genus: Varecia; J. E. Gray, 1863

Type species
- Lemur varius É. Geoffroy ( = Lemur macaco variegatus Kerr, 1792)

Species
- Varecia variegata Varecia rubra
- Distribution of Varecia: red = V. rubra; green = V. variegata

= Ruffed lemur =

Ruffed lemurs

Genus of primates from Madagascar

The ruffed lemurs of the genus Varecia are strepsirrhine primates and are the largest extant lemurs within the family Lemuridae. Like all living lemurs, they are found only on the island of Madagascar. Formerly considered to be a monotypic genus, two species are now recognized: the black-and-white ruffed lemur, with its three subspecies, and the red ruffed lemur.

Ruffed lemurs are diurnal and arboreal quadrupeds, often observed leaping through the upper canopy of the seasonal tropical rainforests in eastern Madagascar. They are also the most frugivorous of the Malagasy lemurs, and they are very sensitive to habitat disturbance. Ruffed lemurs live in multi-male/multi-female groups and have a complex and flexible social structure, described as fission-fusion. They are highly vocal and have loud, raucous calls.

Ruffed lemurs are seasonal breeders and highly unusual in their reproductive strategy. They are considered an "evolutionary enigma" in that they are the largest of the extant species in Lemuridae, yet exhibit reproductive traits more common in small, nocturnal lemurs, such as short gestation periods (~102 days) and relatively large average litter sizes (~2–3). Ruffed lemurs also build nests for their newborns (the only primates that do so), carry them by mouth, and exhibit an absentee parental system by stashing them while they forage. Infants are altricial, although they develop relatively quickly, traveling independently in the wild after 70 days and attaining full adult size by six months.

Threatened by habitat loss and hunting, ruffed lemurs are facing extinction in the wild. However, they reproduce readily in captivity and have been gradually re-introduced into the wild since 1997. Organizations that are involved in ruffed lemur conservation include the Durrell Wildlife Conservation Trust, the Lemur Conservation Foundation (LCF), the Madagascar Fauna Group (MFG), Monkeyland Primate Sanctuary in South Africa, Wildlife Trust, and the Duke Lemur Center (DLC).

== Evolutionary history ==
Lemurs are not known in the fossil record on Madagascar until the Pleistocene and Holocene epochs. Consequently, little is known about the evolution of ruffed lemurs, let alone the entire lemur clade, which comprises the endemic primate population of the island.

Although there is still much debate about the origins of lemurs on Madagascar, it is generally accepted that a single rafting event, similar to the one that brought New World monkeys to South America, occurred around 50–80 million years ago and allowed ancestral lemurs to cross the Mozambique Channel and colonize the island, which had already split from Africa (while it was joined to the Indian subcontinent), approximately 160 million years ago. The resulting founder effect and either non-existent or inferior competition resulted in speciation as the lemur ancestors radiated out to fill open or insufficiently guarded niches. Today, the endemic primate fauna of Madagascar contains over three-quarters of the extant species of the suborder Strepsirrhini, which had been abundant throughout Laurasia and Africa during the Paleocene and Eocene epochs.

=== Taxonomic classification ===
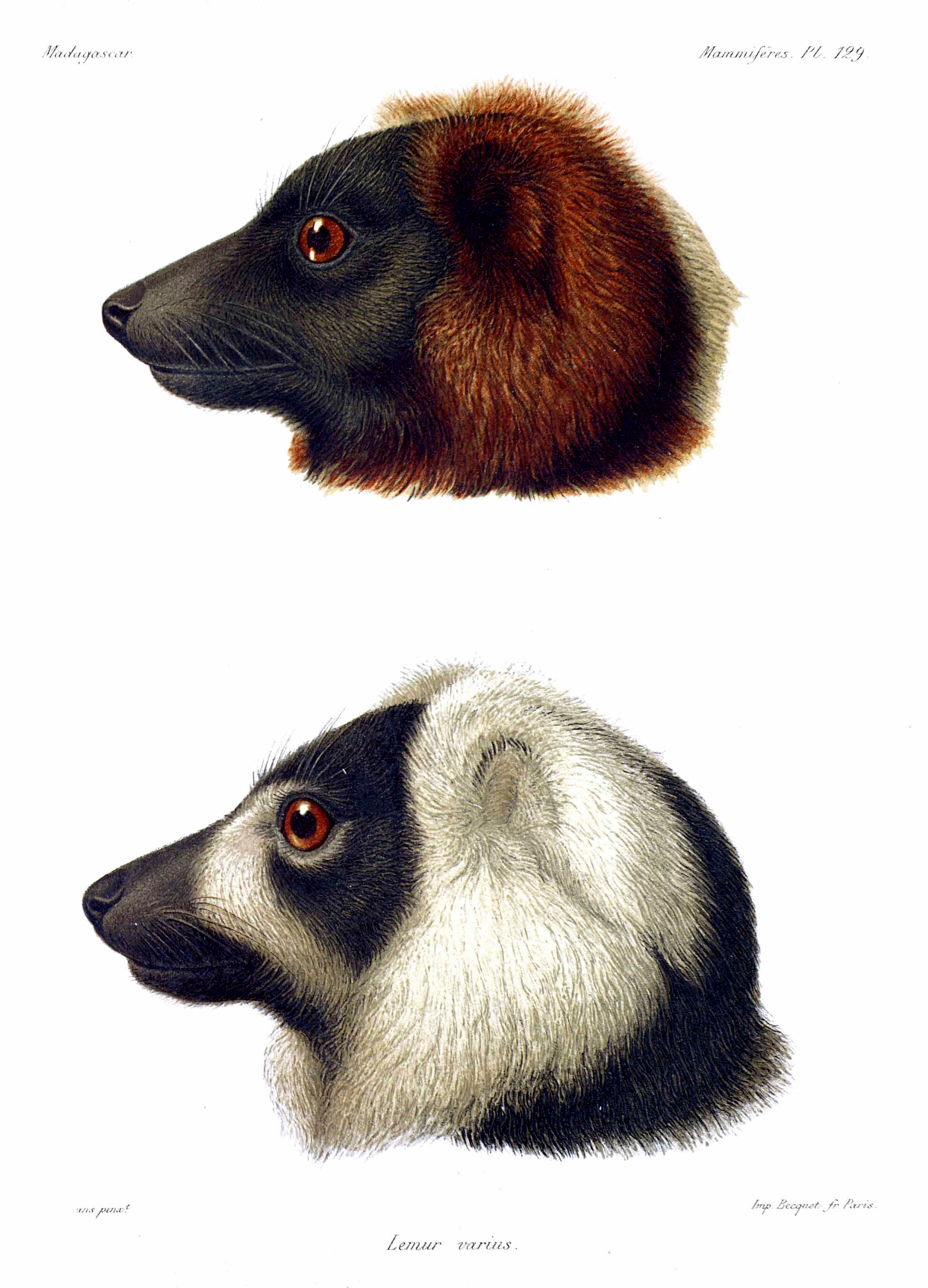
Color print of the two ruffed lemur species from Alfred Grandidier's L'Histoire politique, physique et naturelle de Madagascar. (1892)

The ruffed lemur genus, Varecia, is a member of the family Lemuridae. The extinct genus, Pachylemur most closely resembled the ruffed lemurs but died out after the arrival of humans. The genus Varecia contains two species, red ruffed lemurs and black-and-white ruffed lemurs, the latter having three subspecies.

- Family Lemuridae
  - Genus Eulemur: true lemurs
  - Genus Hapalemur: lesser bamboo lemurs
  - Genus Lemur: the ring-tailed lemur
  - Genus Prolemur: the greater bamboo lemur
  - Genus †Pachylemur
  - Genus Varecia: ruffed lemurs
    - Black-and-white ruffed lemur, Varecia variegata
      - Variegated black-and-white ruffed lemur, Varecia variegata variegata
      - Southern black-and-white ruffed lemur, Varecia variegata editorum
      - Northern black-and-white ruffed lemur, Varecia variegata subcincta
    - Red ruffed lemur, Varecia rubra

=== Changes in taxonomy ===
Ruffed lemurs, along with several species of brown lemur were once included in the genus Lemur. In 1962, the ruffed lemurs were reassigned to the genus Varecia earlier coined after the Malagasy word variky first attested in Frederick de Houtman's 1605 Dutch-Malagasy dictionary.

The red ruffed lemur and the black-and-white ruffed lemur were formerly recognized as subspecies, Varecia variegata rubra and Varecia variegata variegata respectively. In 2001 both were elevated to species status, a decision that was later supported by genetic research. Three subspecies of black-and-white ruffed lemur, which had been published decades earlier, were also recognized as variegata, editorum, and subcincta, although studies have not been entirely conclusive.

Subfossil remains of two extinct lemur species were previously classified under the genus Varecia. Found at sites in central and southwestern Madagascar, Varecia insignis and V. jullyi were very similar to modern ruffed lemurs, but more robust and assumed to be more terrestrial, and thus more prone to predation by early human settlers. More recent studies have shown that these extinct species had a diet similar to that of modern ruffed lemurs and that they were also arboreal in nature. Enough differences were demonstrated to merit a separate genus, Pachylemur. These close relatives of ruffed lemurs are now named Pachylemur insignis and P. jullyi.

Image	Scientific name	Common name	Distribution
	Varecia variegata	Black-and-white ruffed lemur	eastern rainforests of Madagascar
	Varecia rubra	Red ruffed lemur	rainforests of Masoala, Madagascar

== Anatomy and physiology ==
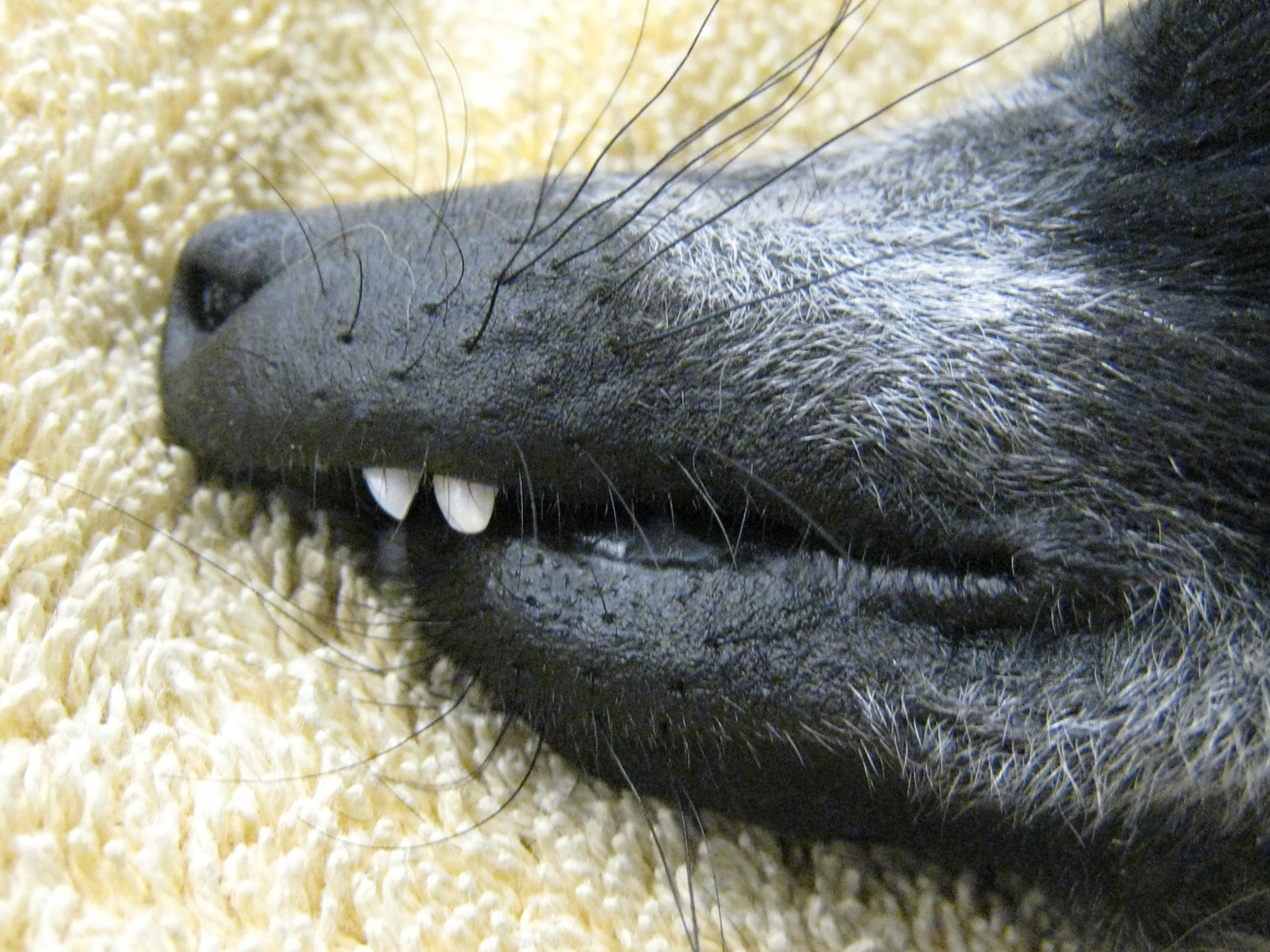
Profile of a typical ruffed lemur overbite

Ruffed lemurs are the largest extant members of the family Lemuridae, with an average head-body length between 43 and 57 cm (17 and 22 in) and a total length from 100 to 120 cm (39 to 47 in), while ranging in weight from 3.1 to 4.1 kg (6.8 to 9.0 lb). The thick, furry tail is longer than the body, averaging 60 and 65 cm (24 and 26 in) in length and is used primarily for balance while moving through the trees. Ruffed lemurs exhibit neither sexual dimorphism nor sexual dichromatism, and females have three pairs of mammary glands.

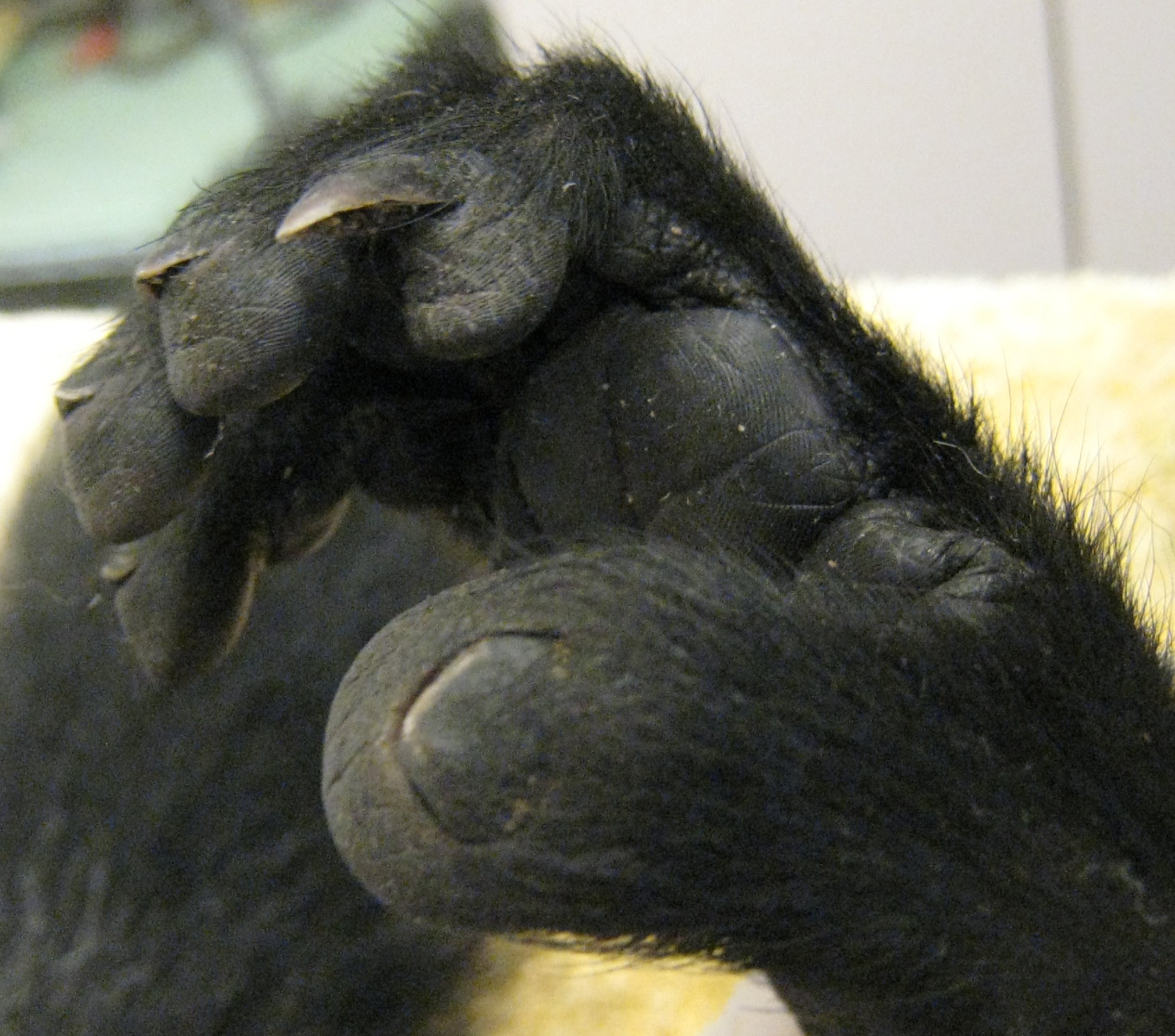
Foot of a ruffed lemur, showing the toilet-claw on the second toe

Ruffed lemurs are characterized by their long, canine-like muzzle, which includes a significant overbite. The face is mostly black, with furry "ruffs" running from the ears to the neck. Depending on the species, these ruffs are either white (V. variegata) or deep reddish (V. rubra). Likewise, the coloration of the fluffy fur also varies by species, while the coloration pattern varies by subspecies in the black-and-white ruffed lemur. There are also intermediates in color variation between the two species.

As with all lemurs, the ruffed lemur has special adaptations for grooming, including a toilet-claw on its second toe, and a toothcomb.

=== Locomotion ===
Ruffed lemurs are considered arboreal quadrupeds, with the most common type of movement being above-branch quadrupedalism. While in the canopy leaping, vertical clinging, and suspensory behavior, are also common, while bridging, bimanual movement, and bipedalism are infrequently seen. When moving from tree to tree, ruffed lemurs will look over the shoulder while clinging, launch themselves into the air, and twist mid-air so that their ventral surface lands on the new tree or limb. Suspensory behavior is more common in ruffed lemurs than in other lemur species. When ruffed lemurs come down to the ground, they continue to move quadrupedally, running with bounding hops and the tail held high.

== Ecology ==
Being highly arboreal and the most frugivorous of the lemurs, they thrive only in primary forest with large fruiting trees, where they spend most of their time in the upper canopy. By spending the majority of their time in the crown of tall forest trees, they are relatively safe from predators such as the fossa.

Ruffed lemurs are active primarily during the day (diurnal), during which time they feed primarily on fruits and nectar, often adopting suspensory postures while feeding. The seeds of the fruit they eat pass through their digestive tract and are propagated throughout the rainforests in their feces, helping to ensure new plant growth and a healthy forest ecosystem. These lemurs are also significant pollinators of the traveler's tree (Ravenala madagascariensis). Without destroying the inflorescence, they lick the nectar from deep inside the flower using their long muzzles and tongues, collecting and transferring pollen on their snouts and fur from plant to plant. This relationship is thought to be a result of co-evolution.

=== Geographic range and habitat ===
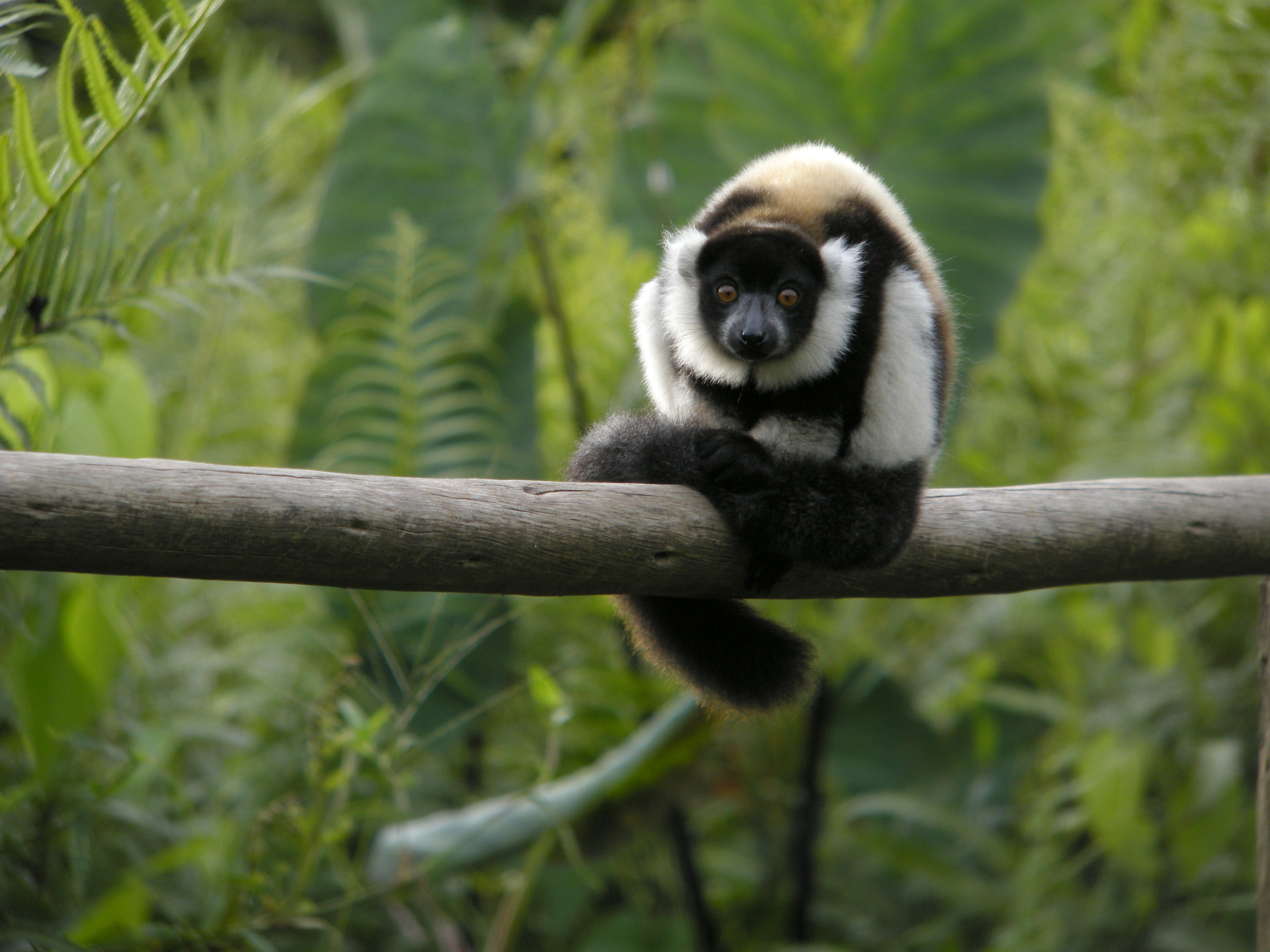
Ruffed lemurs are confined to the canopy of Madagascar's eastern tropical rainforests.

Like all lemurs, this genus is found only on the island of Madagascar off the southeastern coast of Africa. Confined to the island's seasonal eastern tropical rainforests, it is uncommon to rare throughout its range, which historically ran from the Masoala Peninsula in the northeast to the Mananara River in the south. Today, the black-and-white ruffed lemur has a much larger range than the red ruffed lemur, although it is very patchy, extending from slightly northwest of Maroantsetra, on Antongil Bay, in the north down the coast to the Mananara River near Vangaindrano in the south. Additionally, a concentrated population of black-and-white ruffed lemurs, of the subspecies Varecia variegata subcincta, can also be found on the island reserve of Nosy Mangabe in Antongil Bay. It is suspected that this population was introduced to the island in the 1930s. The red ruffed lemur, on the other hand, has a very restricted range on the Masoala Peninsula.

Historically, the confluence of the Vohimara and Antainambalana Rivers may have been a zone of hybridization between these two species, although no conclusive results have indicated current interbreeding. In general, the Antainambalana River appears to isolate the red ruffed lemurs from the neighboring subspecies of black-and-white ruffed lemur, V. v. subcincta. The subspecies V. v. variegata can be found further south, and V. v. editorum is the southernmost subspecies. The ranges of these two southern subspecies overlap and intermediate forms are reported to exist, although this has not been confirmed.

The rainforests in which these animals live are seasonal, with two primary seasons: the hot, wet season (November through April), and the cool, dry season (May through October). The primary habitat for both species, at any season, is in the crowns of trees, where they spend the majority of their time 15 and 25 m (49 and 82 ft) above ground. With the seasonal availability of resources being similar regardless of location, there is little to no difference in tree usage between species. From September through April, more fruit is available, so females prefer the lianas in the crowns of trees. Both sexes prefer the lower, major branches during the hot, rainy season. The tree crowns are predominantly used from May through August when young leaves and flowers are in abundance.

=== Sympatric relations ===
The following lemur species can be found within the same geographic range as ruffed lemurs:

- Greater dwarf lemur (Cheirogaleus major)
- Eastern lesser bamboo lemur (Hapalemur griseus griseus)
- Weasel sportive lemur (Lepilemur mustelinus)
- Diademed sifaka (Propithecus diadema)
- Common brown lemur (Eulemur fulvus)
- Red-bellied lemur (Eulemur rubriventer)
- Eastern woolly lemur (Avahi laniger)
- Indri (Indri indri)
- Brown mouse lemur (Microcebus rufus)
- Aye-aye (Daubentonia madagascariensis)
- White-headed lemur (Eulemur albifrons)

Ruffed lemurs either demonstrate feeding dominance or divide resources by using different forest strata. They are dominant over red-bellied lemurs, while eastern lesser bamboo lemurs avoid encountering them altogether. White-headed lemurs, on the other hand, prefer the understory and lower canopy, below 15 m (49 ft), while the ruffed lemurs mainly keep to the upper canopy, above 15 m (49 ft). Play has even been observed between infant ruffed lemurs and white-headed lemurs.

== Behavior ==
Ruffed lemurs, on average, spend 28% of the day feeding, 53% resting, and 19% traveling, although differences in resting and feeding durations have been observed between males and females, with females resting less and feeding more. They are diurnal; although peak activity occurs during the early morning and late afternoon or evening, resting usually occurs around midday. When resting, ruffed lemurs often sit hunched or upright. They are also frequently seen lying prone over a branch or sunbathing in a supine position with the limbs outstretched. When feeding, they will often hang upside-down by their hind feet, a type of suspensory behavior, which allows them to reach fruits and flowers.

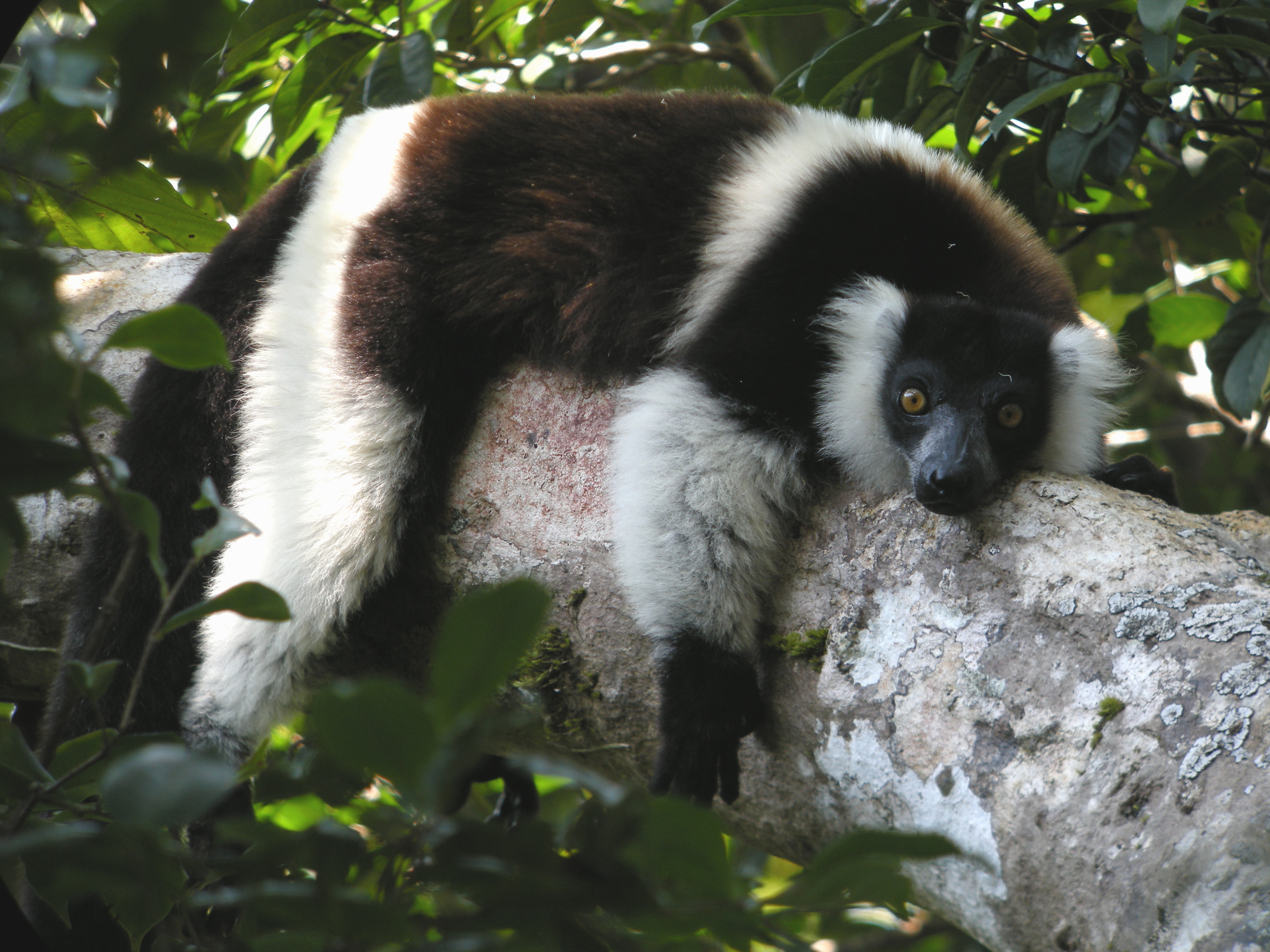
Ruffed lemurs spend more than half the day resting in the canopy.

Being highly arboreal, they spend the majority of their time in the high canopy throughout the day. Ruffed lemurs spend the majority of their time between 15 and 20 m (49 and 66 ft) above the forest floor, followed by 20 to 25 metres (66 to 82 ft) up, and are least frequently seen at 10 to 15 metres (33 to 49 ft). During the hot season, they will relocate to the lower canopy to help regulate their body temperature. In the cold season, ruffed lemurs are least active and may dedicate 2% of their resting time to sunbathing in order to warm up.

Long-term field research has shown that range size, group size, social systems, and territorial behavior vary widely, and may be greatly affected by food distribution and quality. It is generally agreed that the ruffed lemur social system is multi-male/multi-female with a fission-fusion society, although some populations of black-and-white ruffed lemur have been reported as monogamous. This social flexibility is suspected to improve survivability despite an inflexible feeding ecology.

=== Diet ===
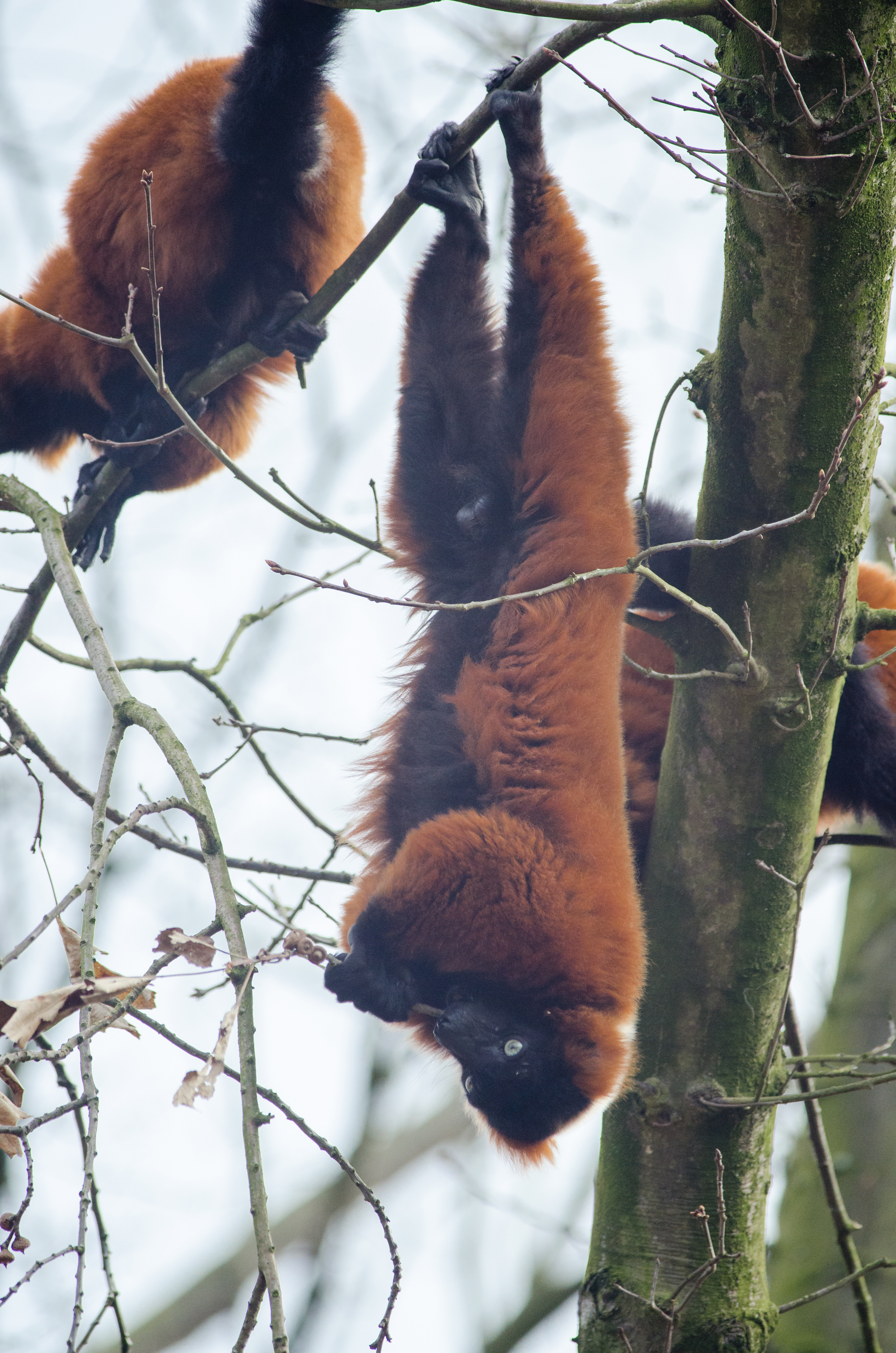
Ruffed lemurs can hang upside-down by their feet to feed on hard-to-reach fruits and leaves.

Being the most frugivorous members of the family Lemuridae, consuming an average of 74–90% fruit, ruffed lemurs also consume nectar (4–21%), and supplement the rest of their diet with young leaves (3–6%), mature leaves (1%), flowers (3–6%), and some seeds. Ruffed lemurs have also been reported to come to the ground to eat fungi and exhibit geophagy.

The majority of their diet is made up of relatively few common plant species, with a few species providing more than 50% of the diet. Fig species of the genus Ficus, for example, account for 78% of the fruit consumed by red ruffed lemurs on the Masoala Peninsula. Although plant species and diets vary by location, the most common food plants reported from the field include the following:

- Canarium
- Cryptocarya
- Ocotea
- Ravensara (family Lauraceae)
- Ficus
- Eugenia/Syzygium
- Grewia

Fruit trees do not appear to be selected by species but by availability and accessibility of edible fruit. And despite predominance of a few plant species in the ruffed lemur diet, the remainder of their diet consists of between 80 and 132 other species from 36 plant families.

The availability of food reflects the seasonal nature of the forests in which they live. During the hot season, fruit, flowers, and young leaves are more abundant, whereas the cold, wet season offers more young leaves and flowers. Despite this, the diet changes little between seasons, except that females will consume more high-protein, low-fiber items, such as young leaves and flowers, during pregnancy and lactation in order to offset the energy costs of reproduction. Nectar is only available sporadically, yet constitutes a major food source when the flowers bloom. The nectar of the traveler's palm (Ravenala madagascariensis) is a favorite among ruffed lemurs.

=== Social systems ===
The social organization of ruffed lemurs is widely variable in both group organization and group composition, although no notable difference can be seen between the two species. Ruffed lemurs are typically described as multi-male groups with a fission-fusion social structure, although this can vary by season and locality.

In a study done at Masoala Peninsula on red ruffed lemurs three levels of organization were identified and defined: communities, core groups, and subgroups. Communities are individuals that affiliated regularly with each other, but rarely with conspecifics outside of the community. Although the entire multi-male/multi-female community lives within a discrete home range, all individuals are never seen in the same location at the same time. Instead, individuals form dispersed social networks, known as core groups, within the community. Core groups are individuals that shared the same core area within a community territory throughout the year. Core groups typically consist of two reproductive females, as well as reproductive males and subadults, ranging in size from two individuals to nine. Females within the groups are cooperative, but male encounters are often agonistic. Subgroups, on the other hand, vary daily in size, composition, and duration, and consist of associated individuals from either the same core group or different core groups, depending on the season. It is from the consistent, daily changes in these subgroups that occur throughout the year, as well as the seasonal formations of core groups in core areas, that demonstrate the fission-fusion nature of ruffed lemur social structure.

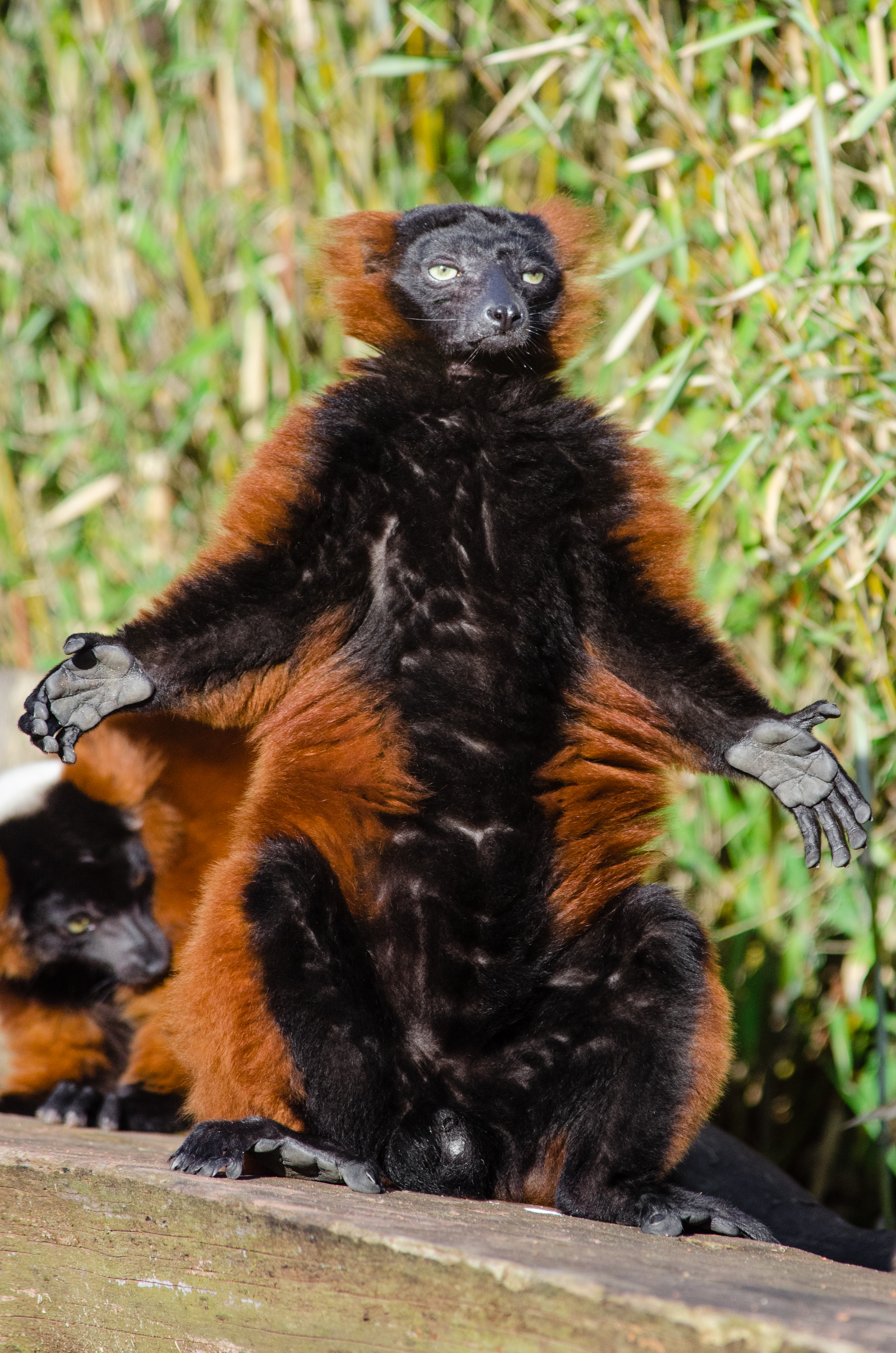
Ruffed lemurs sometimes sunbathe to warm up.

In another study done at Nosy Mangabe on black-and-white ruffed lemurs a fourth level or organization was defined: affiliates. Affiliates were individuals with more persistent social bonds and more frequent interactions, usually within a core group, but sometimes also between core groups within a subgroup. Adult females typically had many affiliates, whereas adult males rarely interacted with conspecifics, living a more solitary existence.

Past studies have reported other social organizations in ruffed lemurs including monogamous pair bonding. This may have been due to the use of short-term, seasonal field studies instead of yearlong studies that take into consideration the effects that changing seasons have on ruffed lemur communities. For instance, during the cold, rainy season, which corresponds with the breeding season, interactions between core groups within a community are significantly reduced. During this time small subgroups form consisting of a mature female, a mature male, and sometimes offspring. This can be misinterpreted as monogamous pair bonding.

Ranging behavior can also exhibit seasonal variability. During the hot, wet season, females range widely, either alone or in groups of up to six individuals. In the cool, dry season, smaller core groups stabilize in order to occupy concentrated areas. Therefore, during seasons when fruit is abundant, subgroups are larger while scarcity is met with more solitary behavior. This suggests that although their feeding ecology is inflexible, being tied to widely distributed, patchy, and sometimes scarce fruit, ruffed lemurs instead adapt the social system in order to survive.

In terms of dominance, the ruffed lemur's social structure is not as clear-cut as other lemur societies where female dominance is the norm. Although it is historically reported that "males were subordinate to females," especially with captive and free-ranging ruffed lemur populations demonstrating this, wild populations cannot be definitively labeled as matriarchal due to inter-group variation.

There are also social differences between males and females. Females typically have many affiliates and bond strongly with other females both within and outside their core areas, but do not affiliate with individuals outside the community range, except during mating season. Males, on the other hand, are more solitary, interact with only a couple of conspecifics, have weak social bonds with other males, and rarely associate with others outside their core group. Furthermore, field studies suggest that only females play a role in communal home range defense. Males may scent-mark and remain relatively silent, but otherwise show little involvement during disputes.

Community range or territory size can vary widely, from 16 to 197 ha (0.16 to 2.0 km^{2}; 0.062 to 0.76 sq mi) while group size can range from a single pair to 31 individuals. Population density is also noticeably variable. These wide ranges can be attributed to differing levels of protection and degree of environmental degradation, with better protection and a less degraded environment resulting in higher population density and more moderately sized community ranges. (The duration and seasonality of the studies involved may also have contributed to low group size estimates and community ranges. A study at the Betampona Reserve, for instance, observed monogamous pairs with two to five infants maintaining ranges of 16 to 43 ha (0.16 to 0.43 km^{2}; 0.062 to 0.17 sq mi).) Core areas at Ambatonikonilahy constituted approximately 10% of the overall community range and showed a close relationship with the location of the largest fruiting trees.

The average daily traveling distance for ruffed lemurs varies between 436 and 2,250 metres (1,430 and 7,382 ft), averaging 1,129 metres (3,704 ft) per day. Activity patterns within the community range vary by gender and season. Males generally stay within a core area all year, whereas females only confine themselves to a core area during the cold wet season, then expand their range throughout the community range during the hot, rainy season. Females expand their traveling range slightly after giving birth, still staying within the core area, but gradually range further in December when they begin stashing their infants with other community members while they look for food. Females range the furthest later during the hot, rainy season. Both activity level and reproductive activity can be summarized in the following table.

Seasonal behavior
Season	Months	Stage	Reproductive cycle	Females activity	Male activity
hot, rainy season	November – April	early	Infant rearing	Expanding travel & infant stashing	Remains in core area
hot, rainy season	November – April	late	Infant rearing	Expands travel throughout community range	Remains in core area
cool, dry season	May – October	early	Mating season	Remains in core area	Remains in core area
cool, dry season	May – October	late	Gestation and birth	Remains in core area & nest building	Remains in core area

Although males demonstrate little involvement in territorial disputes between neighboring communities, and ruffed lemur communities lack cohesiveness, females communally defend the community range against females of other communities. These disputes occur mostly during the hot, rainy season, when resources are more abundant and occur near the boundaries of community ranges. Spacing is maintained by scent marking and vocal communication. Ruffed lemurs are known for their loud, raucous calls that are answered by neighboring communities and subgroups within the same community.

During agonistic encounters between communities, chasing, scent-marking, calling, and occasional physical contact can be seen. Other social behaviors appear to vary between wild and captive ruffed lemurs, as illustrated by the following table.

Behavioral differences: captive vs. wild
	Wild behaviors	Captive behaviors
Aggressive/Agonistic behaviors	attacks; cuffs; grapples; chases	stare; charge; chase; lunge; cuff; feint-to-cuff; bipedal hop; pounce on; push down; bite
Submissive behaviors	chatter vocalizations	chatter vocalizations; displacement; head turning/eye aversion; cowering/flinching; grimacing; backing away; fleeing; jumping away
Affiliate/Affinitive behaviors	female greeting behavior (intertwining and scent marking); play; social grooming; squeal approach / anogenital inspections (males, mating season only)	group movement; huddling together with bodily contact; greeting by sniffing; play (wrestling, grappling, chasing, fleeing and solitary play); social grooming

Some affiliative behaviors are seasonal or gender-specific, such as the male squeal approach and anogenital inspections performed during the mating season. Another example is the female greeting behavior, where two females will use their anogenital scent glands to mark each other's backs, jump over one another, writhe together, and emit squealing vocalizations. This behavior is not seen during the end of the cool, dry season or around gestation. The frequency of other affiliative behaviors can be affected by age. All ruffed lemurs over five months of age allogroom, and, in captivity, subadults participate in play more frequently than adults.

=== Cognitive abilities ===
Historically, relatively few studies of learning and cognition have been performed on strepsirrhine primates, including ruffed lemurs. However, a study at the Myakka City Lemur Reserve demonstrated that ruffed lemurs, along with several other members of the family Lemuridae, could understand the outcome of simple arithmetic operations.

=== Communication ===
==== Olfactory communication ====
As with all strepsirrhine primates, olfactory communication is used extensively by ruffed lemurs – scent marking in territorial defense and disputes, as well as female greeting displays. The scents communicate the sex, location, and identity of their owner.

Females predominantly scent mark with their anogenital scent glands, by squatting to rub their anogenital region along horizontal surfaces, such as tree limbs. Males, on the other hand, favor using the glands on their neck, muzzle, and chest, by embracing horizontal and vertical surfaces and rubbing themselves over them. Both sexes will occasionally scent mark in ways characteristic of the opposite sex.

In greeting displays, female ruffed lemurs will leap over one another, scent marking the other individual's back in the process.

==== Auditory communication ====
Ruffed lemurs are highly vocal, with an extensive vocal repertoire with calls being used in multiple contexts. Calls can also vary seasonally. During the hot, rainy season, the loud, raucous calls that are a hallmark of ruffed lemurs allow groups to remain in contact and maintain spacing. These loud calls can be heard up to 1 kilometre (0.6 mi) away.

Ruffed lemurs use alarm calls that differentiate between ground and aerial predators. For instance an abrupt roar or huff alerts the group to an avian predator, and a pulsed squawk or growl-snort communicates the existence of a mammalian ground predator. When sounding these calls, such as the pulsed squawk, adults direct them at the predator after moving to a safe position. Once the alarm call is sounded by one individual, the resulting chorus can even reach the furthest ranging community members.

In captivity, ruffed lemur vocalizations have been studied and divided into three general groups: high-, medium-, and low-amplitude calls.

High-amplitude calls
Call	Inferred Function
Roar/shriek chorus	Intergroup communication and spacing; Intragroup communication (unspecified social functions)
Abrupt roar	Signals disturbances; Promotes intergroup spacing; Avian predator alert
Pulsed squawk	Mammalian predator alert; Indicates high arousal; Call group together
Wail : (V. variegata only)	Signals end of disturbance; Calls group together
Bray	May serve a mating function (males only)
Quack	May serve a mating function (males only)

The well-known roar/shriek chorus is spontaneous, occurring most often during period of high activity, as well as being contagious, involving communal participation including infants three to four months old. Abrupt roars are also more common during high activity and aside from alerting group members to the presence of an avian predator, they probably also help maintain contact with individuals outside of visual range or indicate an aggressive/defensive response to a disturbance. In the wild, both of these calls are emitted more during the hot, rainy season due to heighten activity. All high-amplitude calls are delivered with from a "taut" body posture.

Medium-amplitude calls
Call	Inferred Function
Growl	Alerts group to low-level disturbance; Announces individual's approach
Growl-snort	Alerts group to mammalian predator or other startling context
Chatter	Signals submission; Signals subordinate status
Whine: sample 1; sample 2	Behavioral frustration; Signals submission; Signals appeasement during mating season (males only)

Medium-amplitude calls operate over a shorter range or often involve moderately arousing situations, such as frustration or submission. Low-amplitude calls also generally operate over a short range, yet also cover a wider range of aggravation levels.

Whines are highly variable between individual ruffed lemurs. Cough, grumble, squeak, and squeal have only been observed and researched in the wild.

Low-amplitude calls
Call	Inferred Function
Grunt	Indicates mild aggravation
Huff: 2 huffs; 3 huffs	Indicates intense aggravation or high level arousal; Aggravation when avian predator is present
Mew: sample 1; sample 2	Contact call between mother and infant; Occasionally used for coordination between individuals while traveling
Cough	Aggression between a female and male during mating/birth seasons
Grumble	Advertises the presence of a male to another
Squeak	Infant distress signal
Squeal	Female affiliation

The calls of ruffed lemurs vary only slightly between the two species. In fact, in captivity, it has been documented that red ruffed lemurs understand and even join in the alarm calls of black-and-white ruffed lemurs. One minor difference between the vocal repertoires of these two species is in the pulse rate and frequency of the pulsed squawk, which is much faster and higher in red ruffed lemurs than in black-and-white ruffed lemurs. The difference in this vocalization is only interspecific, showing no signs of significant sexual dimorphism within each species.

In black-and-white ruffed lemurs, pulsed squawks sometimes slow down as the group calms down, and integrate with the wail, creating pulsed squawk-wail intermediates.

=== Breeding and reproduction ===
Contrary to initial reports of monogamy, ruffed lemurs in the wild exhibit seasonal polygamous breeding behavior, with both males and females mating with more than one partner within a single season. Mating is not restricted to just community members, but also involves members of neighboring communities. Females mate primarily with males with whom they had affiliative relations prior to the mating season, although some matings occurred with roaming males from other communities.

Shortly before mating season begins, females exhibit swelling of the sex skin, which reaches its peak around the middle of their 14.8 day estrous cycle. Male sexual physiology also undergoes its own change, with testicular volume increasing during mating season and peaking around the time of breeding. Aggression also increases during the mating season, both between members of the same sex and by the female towards the male attempting to mate with her. Females have been observed grappling, cuffing, and biting males during copulation. Either sex may approach the other when the female is in estrus. Initially they may roar-shriek with each other. When a male approaches a female, he often lowers his head and squeals, inspecting the female's genitalia by licking or sniffing, scent-marking, and offering a submissive chattering vocalization. When a female approaches a male, she may posture herself for mounting. Mating pairs often copulate many times during the course of a mating bout.

The mating season lasts from May through July, during the cold, rainy season, resulting in birth and peak lactation coinciding with the time that fruit is the most plentiful. The gestation period of ruffed lemurs is the shortest of the family Lemuridae, averaging 102 days (with a range of 90 to 106 days). Gestation in the wild last slightly longer than in captivity, averaging 106 days. Just like the mating season, parturition is also seasonal, synchronized to the end of the cold, dry season and the start of the productive hot, rainy season.

In addition to an abnormally short gestation period, ruffed lemurs share another feature with small, nocturnal lemurs by producing the largest litters of the family Lemuridae. Litters typically include two or three infants, although up to five have been reported. Birth weights in captivity average between 83 and 101.7 g (2.93 and 3.59 oz) and range from 70 to 140 grams (2.5 to 4.9 oz). Ruffed lemur infants are altricial, and are born with their eyes open and a full coat of fur.

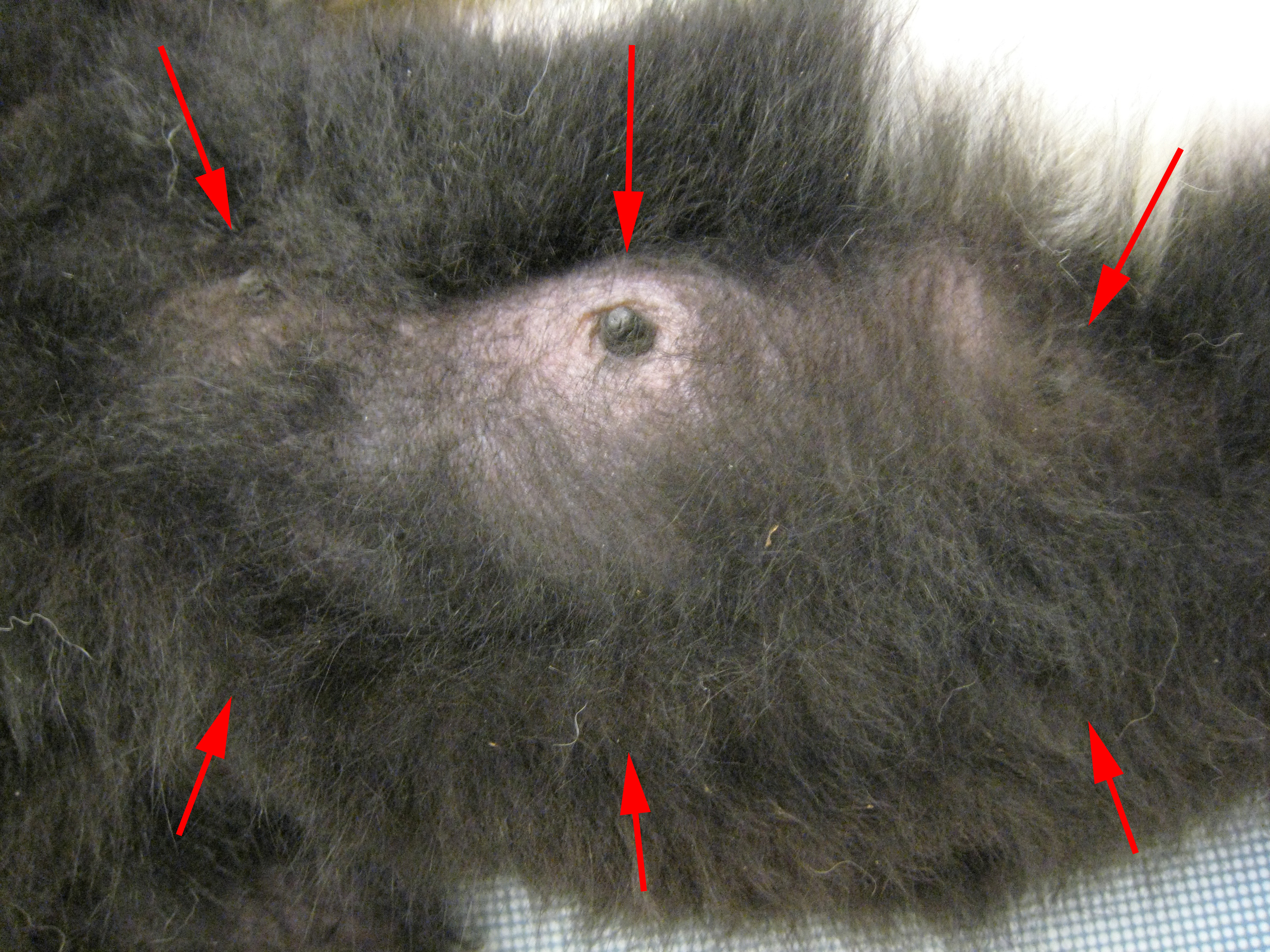
Female ruffed lemurs have three pairs of mammary glands for feeding their large litters

Ruffed lemurs are the only known primates to build arboreal nests, used exclusively for birth and for the first week or two of life. Starting three weeks prior to birth, females begin constructing the nest from twigs, branches, leaves, and vines, locating it within her core area and 10 to 25 metres (33 to 82 ft) above ground. The nests have only one apparent entry point, and are shallow and dish-shaped. During the first couple of weeks, the mother is mostly solitary and does not travel far from the nest, spending as much as 70–90% of her time with the newborns (in captivity). In order to find food, she will leave the infants alone in the nest or, after the first couple of weeks, will carry them in her mouth and stash them in concealed locations in the canopy while she forages. Since this early developmental period corresponds with the end of the cold, dry season, which offers the least amount of fruit, energy is conserved for lactation while travel is limited. As the hot, rainy season begins, fruit availability rises, lactation demands rise as well, and females increase their travel distance in search of food.

Unlike other diurnal primates, which usually carry their infants with them, ruffed lemur mothers will stash their young by concealing them in the canopy foliage, leaving them to rest and sit quietly for several hours while she forages and performs other activities. Mothers continue to transport their offspring by mouth, moving them one at a time by grasping the infant's belly crosswise. This form of transport usually stops around 2.5 months of age when the infants become too heavy to carry.

Ruffed lemurs are cooperative breeders, with parental care being shared by all community members. For example, mothers will stash their offspring with other mothers or leave them to be guarded by other community members, including non-breeding individuals of both genders. While the mother is away, community members will not only care for and guard them, but also sound alarm calls if danger is detected or if leaving the infant alone. They will also respond to alarm calls by others. These coordinated vigilance displays further involve communal transmission of the alarm call, with nearby community members repeating the alarm call, potentially summoning the mother back to her offspring. Infant transport by other members of the community has also been recorded. Females have been observed nursing infants of their close relatives, while close kin have adopted rejected infants, acting as foster parents.

Male care for infants has been documented in ruffed lemur societies. During early development, adult males may guard the nests of multiple core group females, as well as help care for the infants that were likely fathered by other males. During the season when females practice infant stashing, males effectively lighten the reproductive burden of up to several mothers by guarding, huddling, grooming, travelling, playing with and feeding the young.

Female ruffed lemurs produce relatively rich milk compared to other lemurs, and consequently, their young develop faster than those of other lemurs. Infants develop rapidly, attaining approximately 70–75% adult weight by the age of four months. They begin climbing and clinging at one month of age, advancing to the point of independently following their mother and group members through the canopy at heights of 50 to 100 metres (160 to 330 ft) by two to three months. Full adult mobility is attained at three to four months of age. Socially, they begin exchanging contact calls with their mother at three weeks, and select their mother as their play partner 75–80% of the time during the first three months. Participation in greeting displays and more extensive vocalizations commences around four months, while scent marking does not start until six months of age. Infants begin testing solid food starting around 40 days to two months with weaning occurring between four and six months in the wild, although some individuals have continued to nurse until seven to eight months.

Infant mortality is often high among ruffed lemurs, but can also be highly variable. In some seasons, as many as 65% are unable to reach three months of age, possibly due to falls and related injuries, although in some seasons infant mortality is as low as 0%. For those that do survive to adulthood, sexual maturity is attained at 18 to 20 months in females and 32 to 48 months in males. Sexual maturity may take longer to reach in the wild compared to captivity. For females, the inter-birth interval, or time between successive offspring, is typically one year, and in captivity, females can remain reproductively active until the age of 23. The life expectancy for both species of ruffed lemur is estimated at 36 years in captivity.

== Conservation status ==
In a land where approximately 90% of the original island forest has been destroyed, ruffed lemurs cling to only a small fraction of their original range. Completely dependent upon large fruiting trees, neither species appears to be flexible with its habitat choice, with selective logging resulting in significantly lower population densities. Although they can survive in very disturbed habitats with lower population densities, they are still especially vulnerable to habitat disturbance. Decreased genetic diversity, in tandem with hunting, natural disasters, predation, and disease, can easily wipe out small populations.

The black-and-white ruffed lemur was elevated by the IUCN to critically endangered (A2cd) status from endangered status in 2008. They cite that "the species is believed to have undergone a decline of 80% over a period of 27 years, due primarily to a decline in area and quality of habitat within the known range of the species and due to levels of exploitation." The total area of all known localities in which black-and-white ruffed lemurs exist is estimated at less than 8,000 km^{2} (3,100 sq mi), while the total wild population is estimated between 1,000 and 10,000.

The red ruffed lemur was downgraded to endangered status from critically endangered status by the IUCN in 2008. The justification given includes its limited range, its restriction to only the Masoala Peninsula, and its risk from ongoing habitat loss and hunting. This species occupies a range of no more than 4,000 km^{2} (1,500 sq mi), while the total wild population is estimated between 29,000 and 52,000 individuals. Red ruffed lemurs are only protected within the boundaries of the Masoala National Park. Historically, this species has been considered more threatened due to its highly restricted range, compared to the widely distributed black-and-white ruffed lemur. However, its protection within the island's largest national park has slightly improved its chances at survival. Despite this, an assessment done in 2012 and published in 2014 reinstated the critically endangered status for the red ruffed lemur, largely due to the surge in illegal logging in Masoala National Park following the 2009 Malagasy political crisis.

There are several organizations involved in ruffed lemur conservation, including the Durrell Wildlife Conservation Trust, the Lemur Conservation Foundation (LCF), the Madagascar Fauna Group (MFG), Monkeyland Primate Sanctuary in South Africa, Wildlife Trust, and the Duke Lemur Center (DLC). To conservation organizations, the ruffed lemurs are considered indicator, umbrella, and flagship species.

=== Threats in the wild ===
As with other primates, one of the principal threats to both ruffed lemur species is habitat loss due to slash-and-burn agriculture, logging, and mining. Both species appear to be very sensitive to logging, and are thought to be the most vulnerable of rainforest lemurs. The hardwoods that are favored for construction materials and selectively logged are also preferred by ruffed lemurs for their fruits and potentially affect their travel routes through the canopy. Deforestation, on the other hand, is a result of the need to provide firewood and to support subsistence agriculture and cash crops. For red ruffed lemurs, Slash-and-burn agriculture, known locally as tavy, is practiced seasonally on the Masoala peninsula between October and December, and its practice is expanding. Additionally, cattle are sometimes allowed to free-range over these former agricultural clearings, preventing forest re-growth.

Another principal threat to the survival of ruffed lemurs is hunting. Local human populations still hunt and trap ruffed lemurs with traditional weapons, using them as a source of subsistence. Studies from villages in the Makira Forest have revealed that ruffed lemur meat is not only the desired food but is being hunted unsustainably. On the Masoala peninsula, the calls of red ruffed lemurs help hunters locate them. On this peninsula, firearms are used in addition to traditional traps, known as laly, which involve a 5 metres (16 ft) strip of cleared forest with snares set on the few remaining branches that allow the lemurs to cross. Although hunting is illegal, the laws are generally not enforced and the local inhabitants show little concern about their hunting practices, which occur mostly from May to September. Hunting is the biggest concern in the Masoala peninsula because it is likely to continue, whereas logging and slash-and-burn agriculture could be curtailed. In other regions, hunters can scare away ruffed lemurs from their favorite food sources, even if they are hunting other prey. Lastly, these animals are taken from their natural habitats to display for tourists or are sold as exotic pets.

Frequent cyclones also pose a threat, particularly to concentrated or small populations. In late January 1997, Cyclone Gretelle destroyed 80% of the Manombo forest canopy. With their habitat, including most of their food resources, effectively destroyed, the ruffed lemurs of the forest broadened their diet, remaining surprisingly frugivorous. Their body weights dropped and no births were reported for four years, but they managed to stave off starvation. This event demonstrated not only their flexibility in the face of natural disasters, which may highlight the evolutionary reasons behind their reproductive capacity and litter size but also the threat faced by already stressed populations.

Predation in the wild appears to be very rare for ruffed lemurs, probably because living in the high canopy makes them challenging to catch. Evidence of predation by raptors, such as the Henst's goshawk (Accipiter henstii) suggests it occurs at a low rate. The fossa (Cryptoprocta ferox) could present a potential risk if it found an individual lower in the forest canopy, but no confirmation has been presented to indicate that they prey upon ruffed lemurs. Instead, only re-introduced, captive-bred ruffed lemurs have been killed by fossa, likely due to their inexperience with predators. Nesting behavior poses the biggest risk of predation, making them susceptible to carnivorous mammals, such as the ring-tailed mongoose (Galidia elegans) and brown-tailed mongoose (Salanoia concolor).

=== Captive breeding and reintroductions ===
Captive populations of both ruffed lemur species exist in American and European zoos, representing a safeguard against extinction. In the United States, captive breeding is managed by the Species Survival Plan (SSP), a program developed by the Association of Zoos and Aquariums (AZA). Although the populations are very limited in their genetic diversity, these species thrive in captivity, making them an ideal candidate for reintroduction into protected habitat, if it is available. Although reintroduction is seen as a last resort among conservationists, a combination of in situ conservation efforts, such as legal protection, public education, the spread of sustainable livelihoods, and reforestation offer hope for ruffed lemurs. In the meantime, reintroductions offer conservation research opportunities and allow the limited genetic diversity maintained by the SSP to improve the genetic diversity of dwindling Malagasy ruffed lemur populations.

A captive release first occurred in November 1997, when five black-and-white ruffed lemurs (Varecia variegata variegata) born in the United States were returned to Madagascar for release in the Betampona Strict Nature Reserve in eastern Madagascar. Popularly known as the Carolina Five, these individuals had lived their entire lives in the Natural Habitat Enclosures at the Duke Lemur Center (DLC). Since then, two more groups totaling 13 captive-born ruffed lemurs have been reintroduced into the same reserve, once in November 1998 and again in January 2001. These latter two groups also received "boot camp training" in the DLC forested free-range enclosures prior to release. So far, the results have shown some success, with 10 surviving longer than one year, 3 individuals integrating into wild groups, and 4 offspring have been born to or sired by released lemurs, all of which were parent-raised. Saraph, a male released with the first group, was reported to be doing well seven years post-release, living in a social group with a wild female and their offspring. Research has been ongoing since the initial release, as illustrated in the 1998 BBC documentary In the Wild: Operation Lemur with John Cleese. The research has provided useful information about their adaptation to life in the wild.
