= Parc Ivoloina =

Coordinates: 18.0575°S 49.3808°E

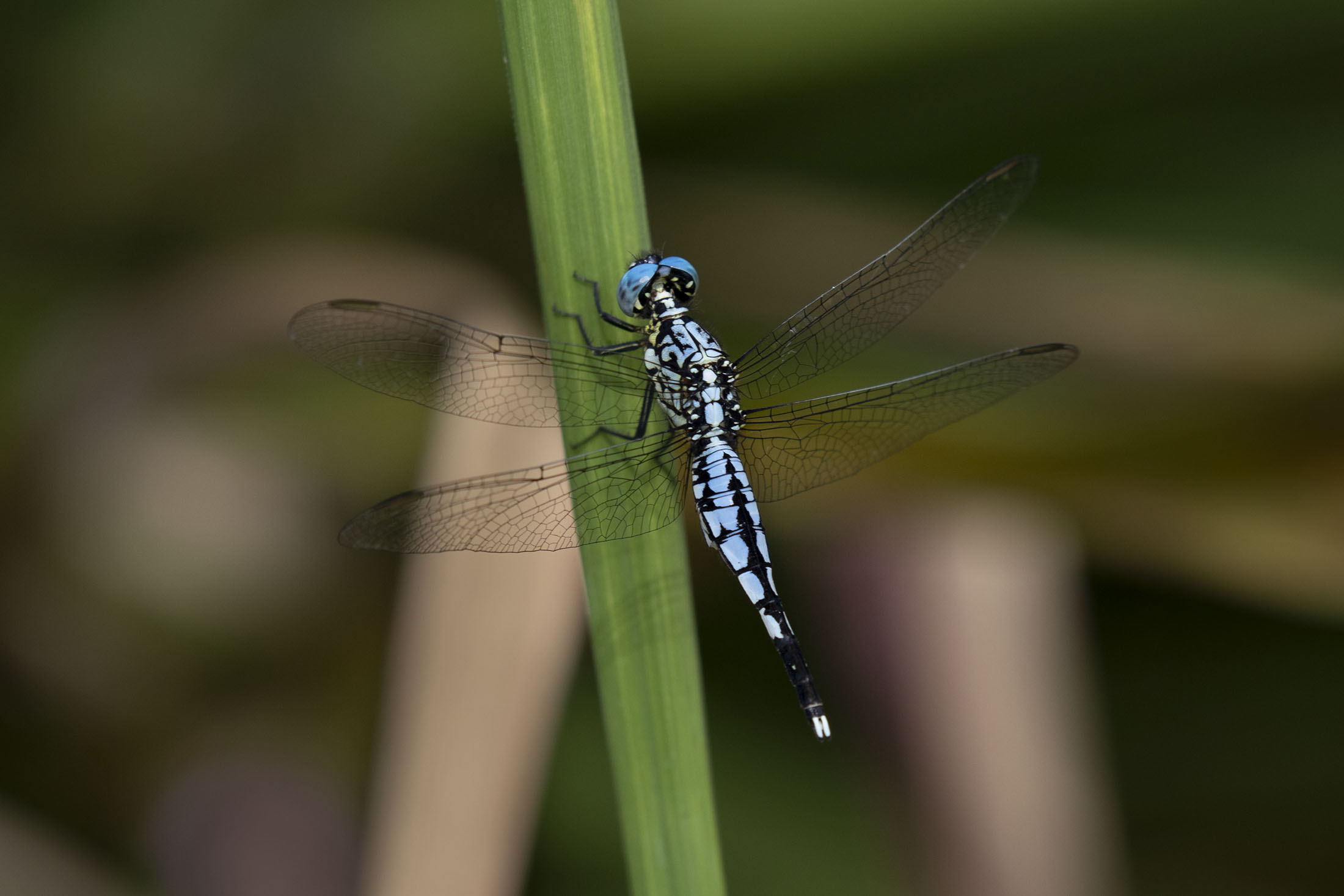
- Interactive map of Parc Ivoloina
- Location: Toamasina, Madagascar
- Land area: 4 hectares (9.9 acres)

Parc Ivoloina (eev’-uh-lah-ween) is a recreational and educational zoological park home to lemurs, reptiles, amphibians, and other native Malagasy species near the city of Toamasina in eastern Madagascar. On their own or with a guide, visitors can explore the wildlife exhibits, orchards, an education center, model agricultural station, historic ruins, and nine kilometers of hiking trails. A dugout canoe tour is also available. A sampling can be accomplished as a day trip or visitors can arrange multiple days staying overnight.

Beyond the visitor experience, Parc Ivoloina is a regional conservation and education center consisting of a 4 hectare zoological park and a 282 hectare forestry station and offers and Environmental Education Center as well as the Ivoloina Conservation Training Center. The extensive operations on the site are one of the initiatives of the Madagascar Fauna and Flora Group - a non-governmental conservation organization supported by a consortium of zoos, aquariums, botanical gardens, universities, and other related organizations.

== Wildlife ==
Parc Ivoloina is home to twelve different species of lemurs including five species of free-ranging lemurs. Of note are the critically endangered black and white ruffed lemur, the greater bamboo lemur, and the blue-eyed black lemur. The site also cares for three species of nocturnal lemur, including the infamous aye-aye. Visitors can also find radiated tortoises, boas, tomato frogs, panther chameleons, and more

Birders will find malachite kingfishers, white-faced whistling ducks, and many other species around the park's Lake Fulgence.

Note: While some animals were born in the forest, most of the animals at Parc Ivoloina were donated, exchanged with other zoos, or seized by the Malagasy government from illegal operations. All of the animals at Parc Ivoloina were obtained legally.

== Day Trips ==
Parc Ivoloina is a popular day trip from Toamasina and is a featured excursion for cruise ships. This short trip enables visitors to get a sampling of the site. It is open 365 days per year from 9 a.m. to 5 p.m. Reservations are not required to walk the grounds. It is highly recommended to arrange a guide by contacting them ahead of time to get a better appreciation of the flora and fauna and history and ongoing operations of the parc.

== Nocturnal Tours ==
Nocturnal tours start at 5:30 and need to be reserved in advance.

== Overnight Accommodations ==
Parc Ivoloina offers basic but comfortable accommodations. It is highly recommended to arrange in advance.

== Amenities ==
Food and beverage is available on-site at a restaurant on the lake. A gift shop offers unique and whimsical souvenirs made by Malagasy artisans.

== Events/Training ==
Parc Ivoloina has a conference room and dining hall available including a dormitory, dining hall, and kitchen for single or multiple day events.

== Location ==
Located 30 minutes north of the city of Toamasina in eastern Madagascar. Transportation is available by private taxi, tuk took, pousse pousse, or taxi brousse.

== About the Madagascar Fauna and Flora Group ==
Founded in 1988, the MFG is committed to conserving Malagasy biodiversity, with particular focus on lemurs and other endangered plants and animals which are endemic to Madagascar’s eastern rainforests. Parc Ivoloina is a regional center for these conservation efforts. A few of these programs include caring for confiscated wildlife, providing environmental education for students, promoting sustainable agricultural practices to local area farmers, engaging the community in reforestation, holding capacity building trainings for teachers, farmers, and veterinarians. 100% of the proceeds from visits to Parc Ivoloina directly support their conservation education efforts in eastern Madagascar.
