= Suspensory behavior =

Suspensory behaviour is a form of arboreal locomotion or a feeding behavior that involves hanging or suspension of the body below or among tree branches. This behavior enables faster travel while reducing path lengths to cover more ground when travelling, searching for food and avoiding predators. Different types of suspensory behaviour include brachiation, climbing, and bridging. These mechanisms allow larger species to distribute their weight among smaller branches rather than balancing above these weak supports. Primates and sloths are most commonly seen using these behaviours, however, other animals such as bats may be seen hanging below surfaces to obtain food or when resting.

== Biomechanics ==
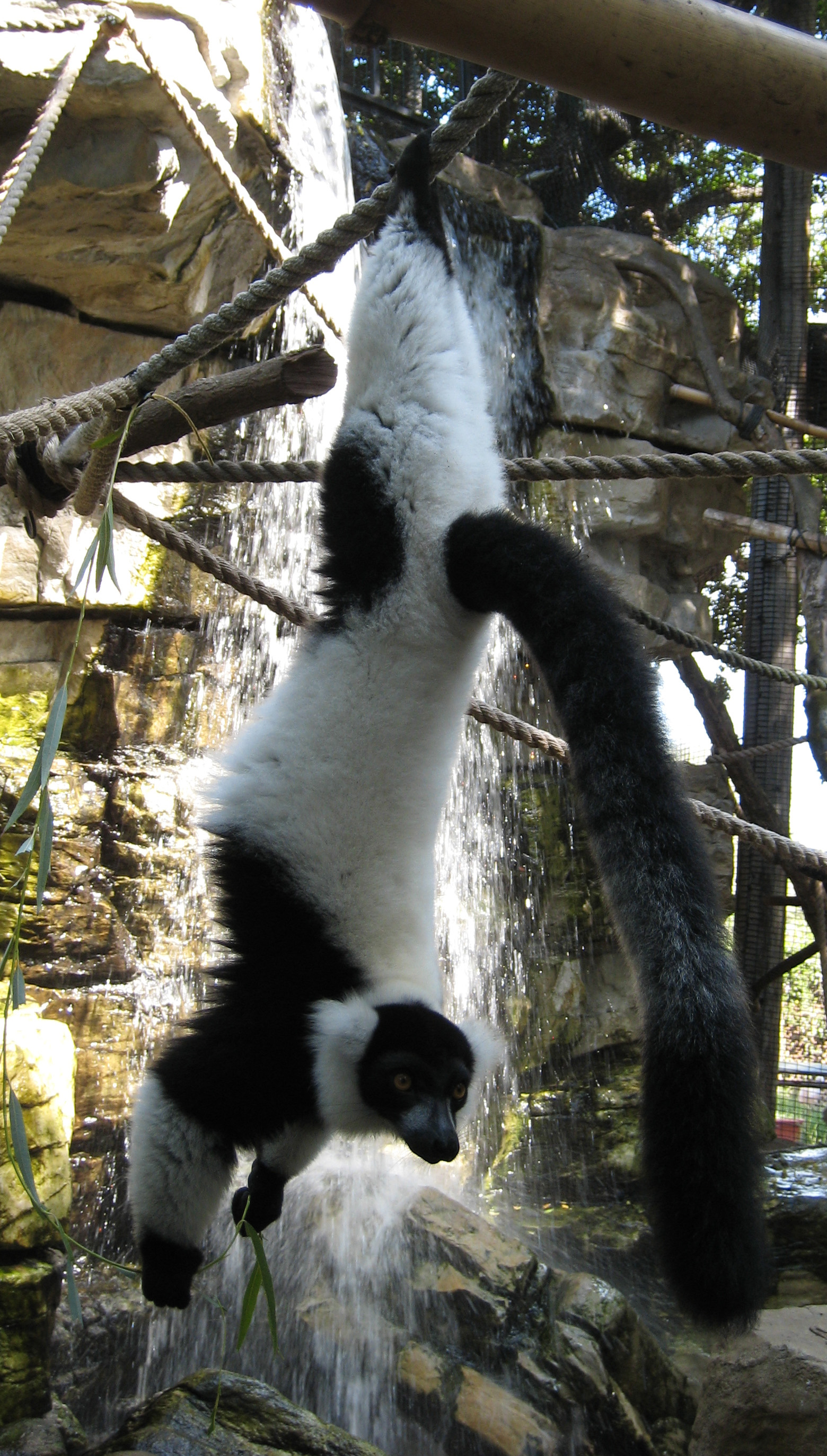
Suspensory behavior seen in ruffed lemur (Varecia variegata)

=== In primates and sloths ===
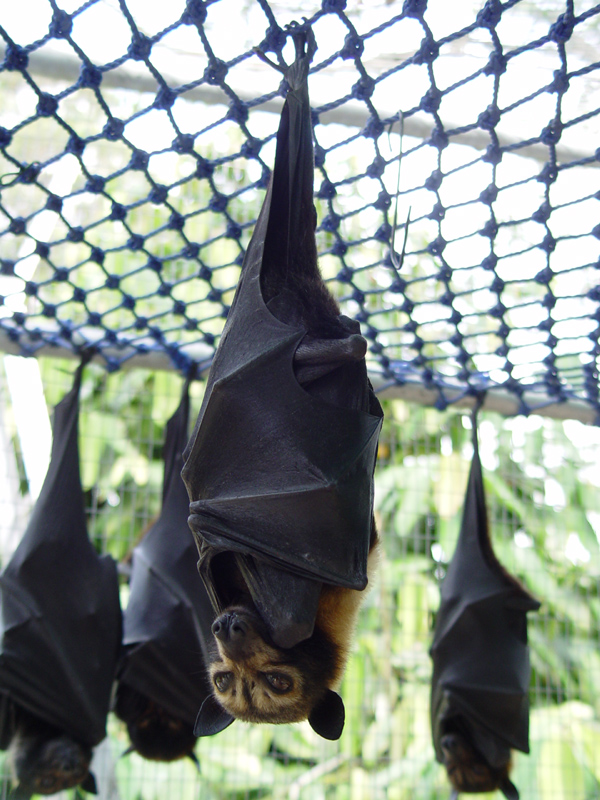
Roosting behaviour in flying foxes (Pteropus conspicillatus)

Animals who exhibit suspensory behaviour have similar mechanisms to perform this action and often involve many different parts of their body like the trunk, shoulders and many other features of their upper body. Typically, these animals have an overall dorso-ventral flattening, a shortened lumbar region and a mediolateral expansion of the rib cage causing the scapula to be repositioned dorsally and humeral articulation to be oriented more cranially than the usual lateral placement shown in quadrupedal animals. The scapula is also longer, giving these animals a particular arm and shoulder shape. Combined, these morphologies allow for the infraspinatus muscle to be repositioned creating more resistance to trans articular tensile stress for suspending below a branch. These animals also have longer clavicles, creating a bigger projection of the shoulder which increases the ability to move when the forearm is raised above the head. To help with supporting their weight, the forelimbs are elongated. The humerus is longer as well and this helps with the movement of the deltoid muscles in the shoulder joint when the arm is moving away from the body. The triceps branchii is small and there is a shorter distance to the elbow joint and a shorter olecranon process which allows for a greater elbow extension.

Animals, especially primates, have many different ways to position themselves during suspensory behaviour, and these positions require different bones and muscles. Below is a list of different positions and their mechanisms.

- Sit/forelimb-suspend: Most of the weight of the body is put on the ischium, however the abducted forelimbs grab a hold of a branch overhead and allow for the body to be stabilized and supports some of this weight that is being put on the ischia.
- Cling/forelimb-suspend: One of the forelimbs is hanging causing more than half the weight to be put the hindlimbs and the clinging forelimb.
- Forelimb-suspend: One or both arms is holding all the weight of the animal as it hangs from a branch.
  - Unimanual forelimb-suspend: Suspension using one hand with lack of support from the rest of the body. The humerus is abducted and the elbow is usually extended completely.
  - Bimanual forelimb-suspend: suspensions using both hands.
  - Forelimb-suspend/sit: This is similar to sit/forelimb-suspend except more than half the weight is held by the forelimbs and not the ishchia. The arms of the animal are extended and the remainder of the weight is supported by the ishchia and/or feet. In this position one arm can hang, creating most of the weight to be held by the single forelimb.
  - Forelimb-suspend/squat: suspension from above but the lower body is in a squat position.
  - Forelimb-suspension/stand: Half of the weight is supported by the two forelimbs that are extended, the other half is supported from standing.
  - Forelimb-suspend/cling: Hind limbs are flexed and grasping a support while one or both of the forelimbs are grasping the support as well, distributing the weight evenly.
  - Forelimb-suspend/lie: suspension of the forelimbs with the back in a horizontal position, as if they were lying on their back.
  - Trunk-vertical-suspend: One or both forelimbs and one or both hind limbs carry the weight. The foot/feet are above the level of the hip. This differs from other forms as all four limbs have tension.
  - Unimanual flexed-elbow-suspend: Suspension with the humerus adducted and the elbow not extended. These parts of the body hold the animals entire weight.
  - Bimanual flexed-elbow-suspend: similar to unimanual flexed-elbow-suspension, expect both hands are involved, not just one.
- Forelimb-hindlimb-suspend: hanging from the arm and foot.
  - Ipsilateral forelimb-hind-limb-suspend: suspension with a forelimb and hind limb on the same side of the body.
  - Contralateral forelimb-hind-limb-suspend: suspension with a forelimb and a hind limb on the opposite sides of the body.
- Tail-suspend: suspension from the tail, with no support from the rest of the body.
  - Tail/forelimb-suspend: Half of the weight is on the tail and the other half on the forelimb(s).
  - Tail/hind limb-suspend: Half of the weight is on the tail and the other half on the hind limb(s).
  - Pronograde tail/quadrumanous-suspend: All five limbs help support the body while the back is horizontal.
  - Orthograde tail/quadrumanous-suspend: All five limbs help support the body while the back is vertical.
- Hind limb-suspend: Suspension from the foot/feet, no support from any other body parts.
- Flexed-hind limb-suspend: Knee and the hip are flexed during suspension.
- Extended-hind limb-suspend: Knee and hip are extended during suspension.

=== In bats ===
Roosting is a vertical upside down behaviour seen in bats which involves the use of the feet to grasp a surface. The hind limbs are very important as they provide most of the strength to support the bat. The forelimbs can be used as well, having all four limbs supporting the animal. The head and neck are usually kept at a 90° or 180° angle.

== Locomotion ==
Suspensory locomotion aids with reducing path lengths and covering longer distances by moving faster through branches and trees above. The movements of involved in suspensory behavior can be described as being seen most often among monkeys. The swinging motion of grabbing branch after branch with alternating hands or launching the body from one support to another losing contact with the support is very common and the most popular form of locomotion among suspensory animals. Some animals such as the platyrrhines, use their tails for traveling and usually never use their forelimbs for transportation, while some species use both their tails and forelimbs. Suspensory behavior is advantageous for avoiding predators. The quick motions and ability to escape high above the ground enables an avoidance strategy, maintaining survival. While this type of locomotion can be beneficial there can be some consequences when dealing with extreme heights as vigorously moving through the trees allows for more opportunity for injury. The easiest way for animals to avoid this consequence is using their abilities to focus on uninterrupted travel, accuracy and avoiding alternative routes.

=== Types of locomotion ===
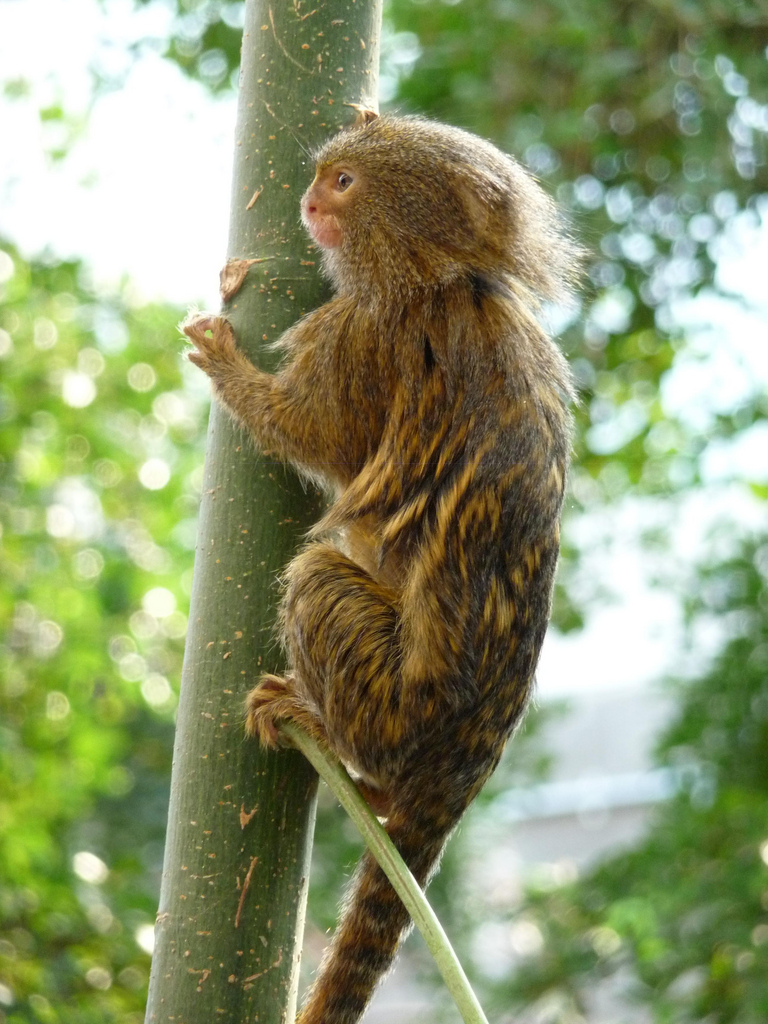
Pygmy marmoset (Cebuella pygmaea) climbing tree

==== Brachiation ====
Brachiation involves the animal swinging from branch to branch in a sequence motion above the ground in a canopy of trees. Typically these movements involve both arms without the aid of the legs or tail. Tail and hind limb suspension can be used in different situations like feeding or escaping predators during drastic situations, however the use of the arms is preferred for this type of movement.

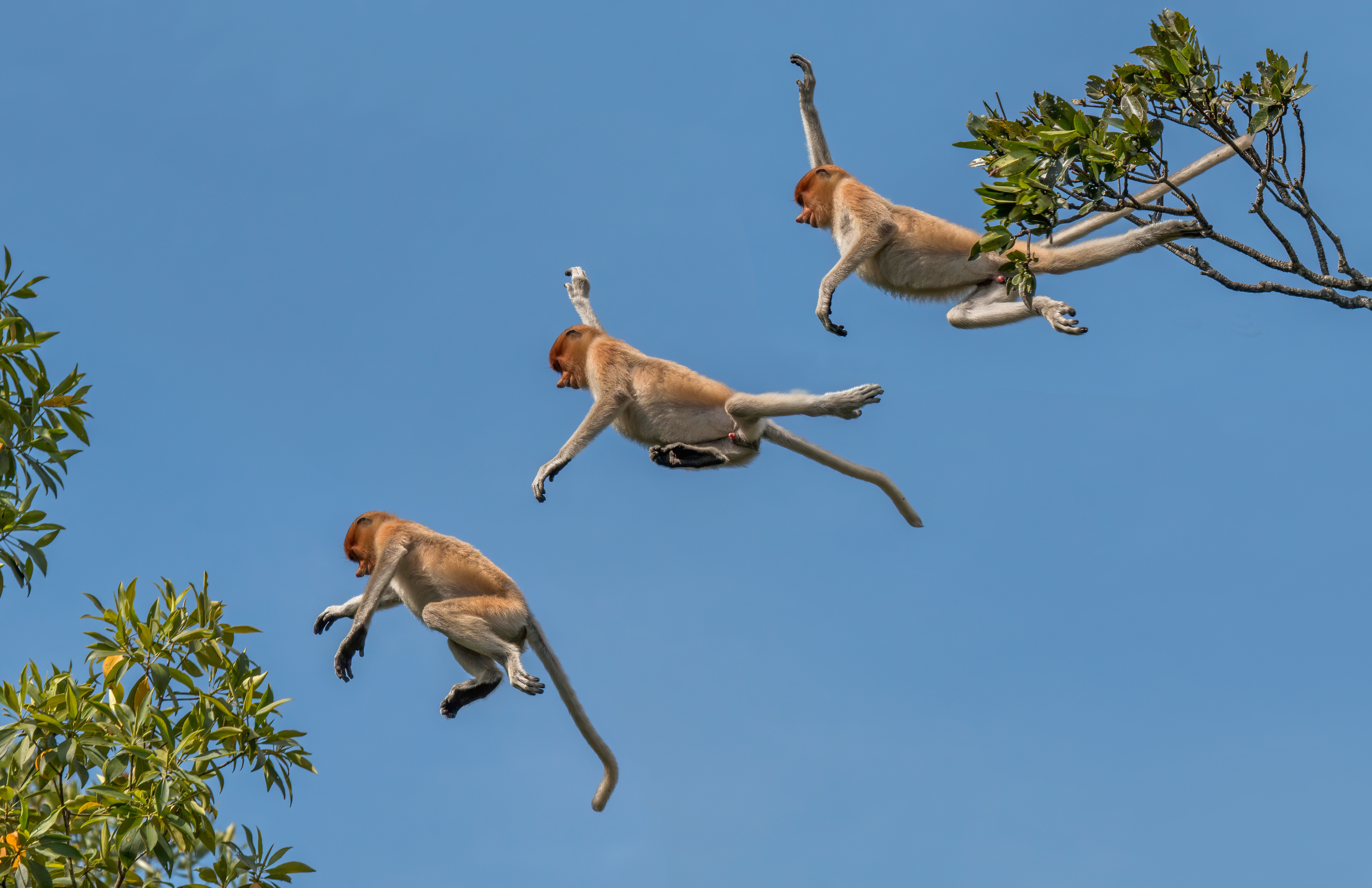
Composite image of a juvenile proboscis monkey (Nasalis larvatus) learning to leap from one tree to another

==== Climbing ====
Climbing consists of moving up or down a vertical surface using all four arms and legs to help move the body upward or downward. There are many different ways in which an animal can climb such as using alternating arms and legs, climbing sideways, fire-pole slides and head or bottom first decline. Vertical climbing is the most costly form of locomotion as the animal must defy gravity and move up the tree. This is particularly harder for animals with a larger body mass, as carrying their entire weight becomes more difficult with size. Also involved with climbing is a "pulling up" motion in which the animal will pull itself above a branch using both of its arms and the hind limbs launch over the branch using a swinging motion.

==== Bridging ====
Animals use this type of behavior when crossing between trees and other surfaces. This movement requires the use of the hind limbs to leap across extended areas. Small animals have an easier time leaping between gaps, while larger animals are more cautious due to their weight and typically swing from branch to branch instead.

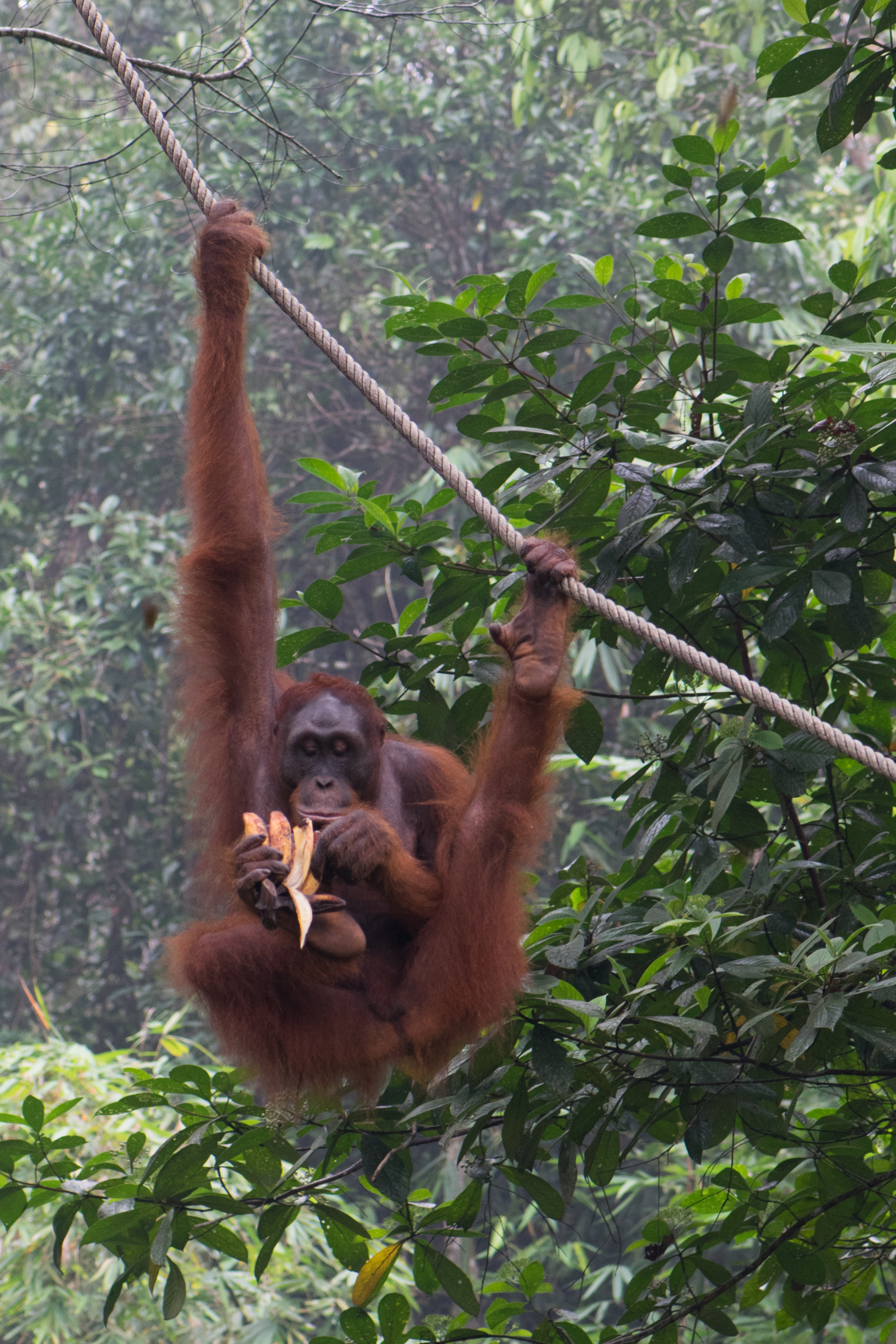
Feeding while suspended from a rope

== Feeding ==
Suspensory behaviour is very important for animals in regards to feeding. It has been reported that suspensory movements make up approximately 25% of all feeding strategies shown in primates. Suspension helps them reach fruits and other vegetation that might be difficult to obtain on foot, while allowing them to cover a large distance at a greater speed. Often in arboreal regions, flowers, fruits and other plants are located on small terminal branches and suspension enables animals to access this food while saving time and energy. By suspending below the branch they avoid a greater chance at the branch breaking and are able to keep a steady balance. Hanging by the tail is very common when foraging which permits the use of the hands and arms to not only grab food but to catch themselves if they were to slip or fall. Suspension allows for fast travel, which is helpful when collecting food as well. Speed allows animals to minimize competition while avoiding predators to ensure they grab as much food as they can in a short period of time. If an animal is in a high tree, they often eat their food then and there to avoid injury and predators. Quadrupedalism and bipedalism combined with suspensory mechanisms are crucial for providing support during feeding so the animal does not fall and risk losing the food, or risking its life.

== Examples ==
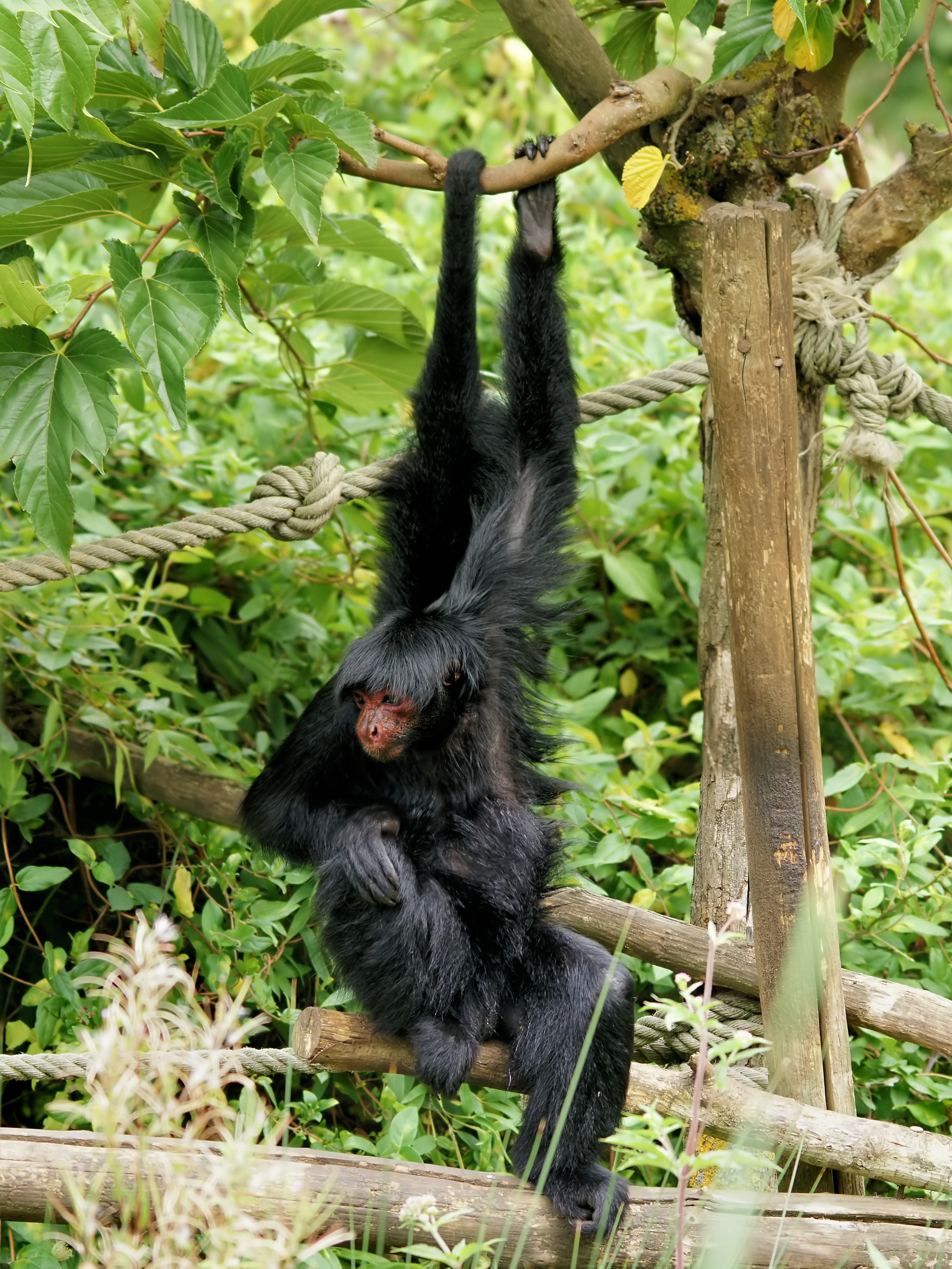
Spider Monkey (Ateles paniscus)

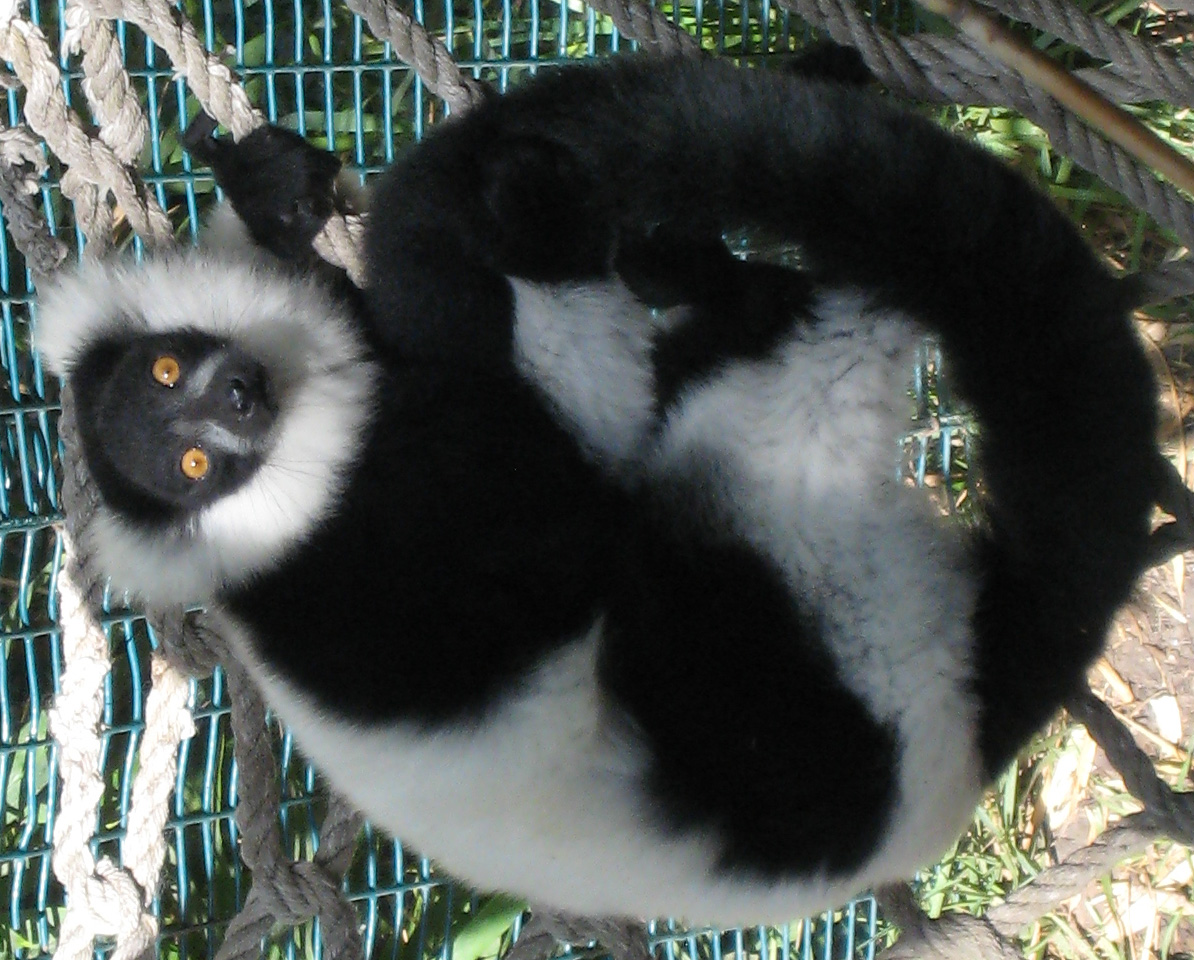
Ruffed Lemur (Varecia variegata)

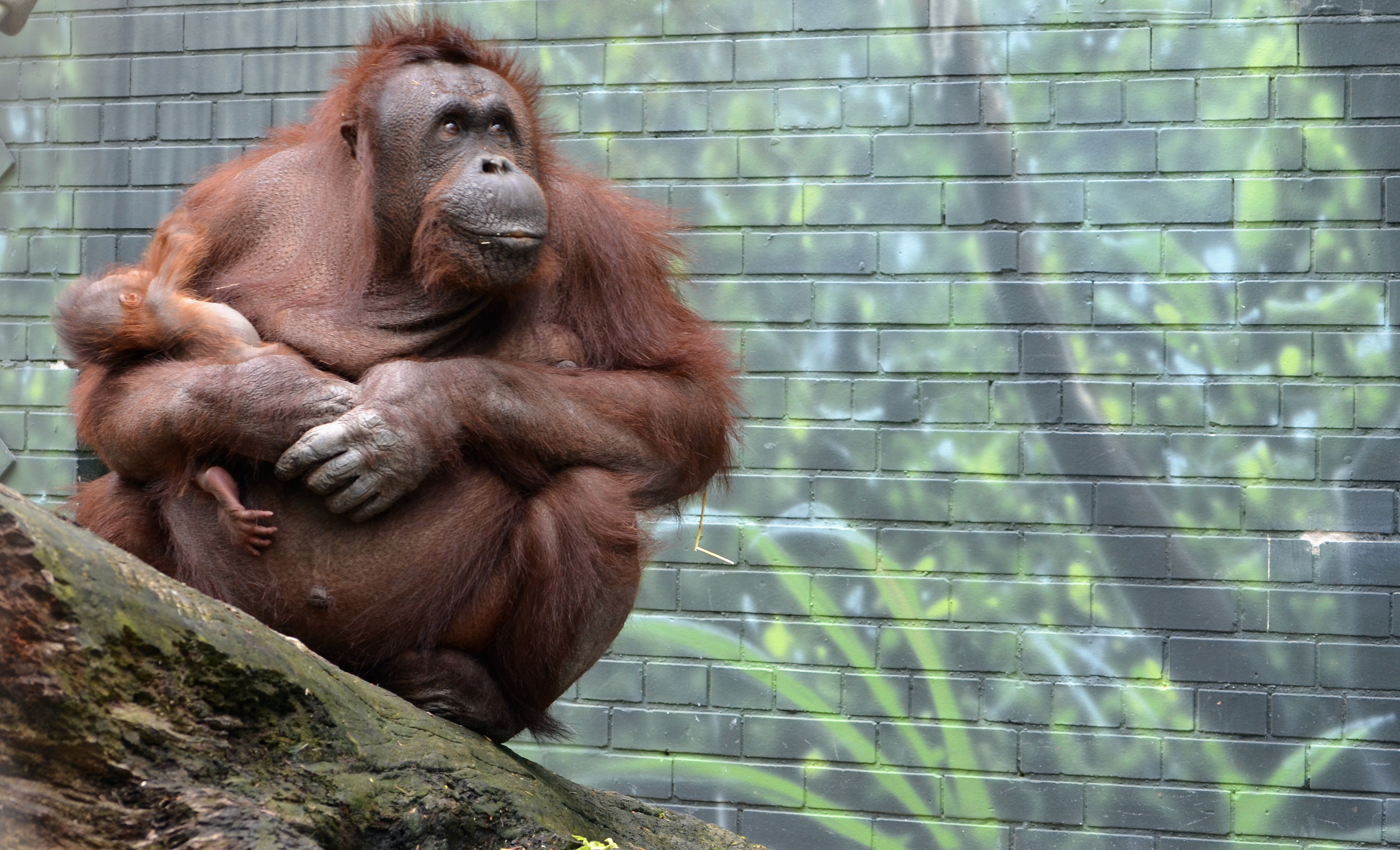
Bornean Orangutan (Pongo pygmaeus)

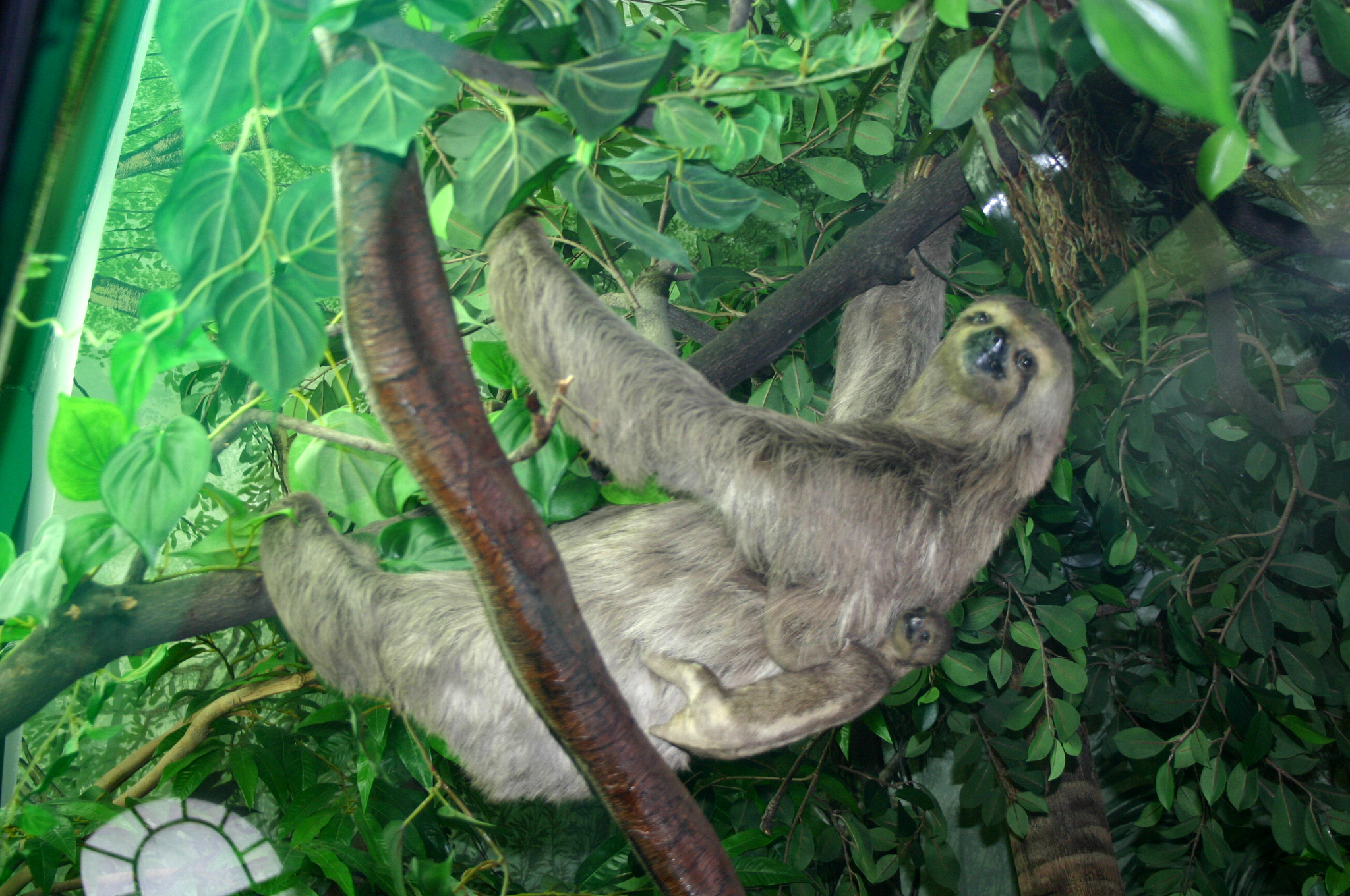
Pale Throated Sloth (Bradypus tridactylus)

== See also ==
- Arboreal locomotion
- Brachiation
- Climbing
