= Lemur Conservation Foundation =

International environmental nonprofit organization

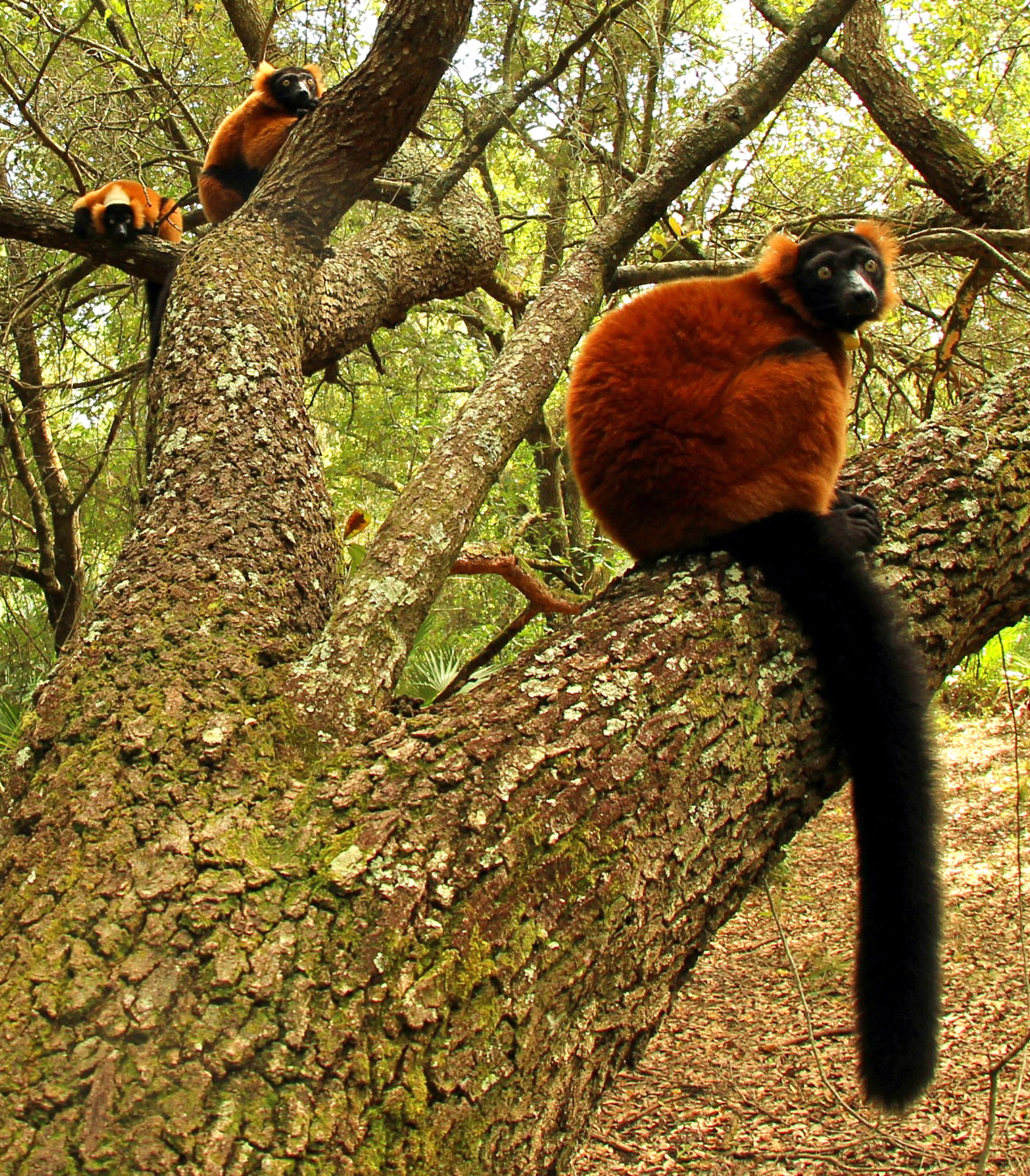
- Red ruffed lemurs at the Myakka City reserve
- Abbreviation: LCF
- Formation: 1996; 30 years ago
- Founder: Penelope Bodry-Sanders
- Type: Nonprofit
- Tax ID no.: 59-3359549
- Legal status: 501(c)(3)
- Purpose: Preserve and conserve the primates of Madagascar
- Headquarters: Myakka City, Florida and Sambava, Madagascar
- Key people: Deborah Robbins Millman, Executive Director
- Staff: 11
- Website: www.lemurreserve.org

The Lemur Conservation Foundation (LCF) is a non-profit organization dedicated to the preservation and conservation of the primates of Madagascar through managed breeding, scientific research, education, and art. It was founded in 1996 by Penelope Bodry-Sanders under the advisement of paleoanthropologist Ian Tattersall. The foundation's reserve in Myakka City, Florida, United States, is home to more than 50 lemurs of several different species, most of which are critically endangered or endangered, including ring-tailed lemurs, red ruffed lemurs, mongoose lemurs, collared brown lemurs, common brown lemurs and Sanford's lemurs.

The Lemur Conservation Foundation maintains an active office in northeastern Madagascar and supports conservation initiatives with a focus on community and habitat protection programs in and around Anjanaharibe-Sud Reserve and Marojejy National Park. LCF offers internship opportunities in primate husbandry and research. The organization has initiated more than a dozen community-based conservation programs including several silky sifaka research projects.

== History ==
Lemur Conservation Foundation was founded by Penelope Bodry-Sanders as the Lower Primate Conservation Foundation in 1996. Bodry-Sanders was alerted to the need for conservation effort for lemurs by paleoanthropologist Ian Tattersall, her colleague at the American Museum of Natural History in New York City. They contacted Duke Lemur Center and received assurances from the research center that they would be provided with the primates to inhabit a reserve located in the United States. She purchased several acres of land in Myakka City, Florida, using a $35,000 inheritance as the initial funding source. In 2001, the organization was renamed the Lemur Conservation Foundation.

== Reserves and operations ==
LCF is certified by the Association of Zoos and Aquariums as a related facility. For the first 14 years of its history, Bodry-Sanders served as LCF's executive director until her retirement from the position in 2010. She was succeeded by Lee Nesler and Alison Grand, then by Deborah Robbins Millman, who has been LCF's executive director since 2020.

=== Myakka City ===
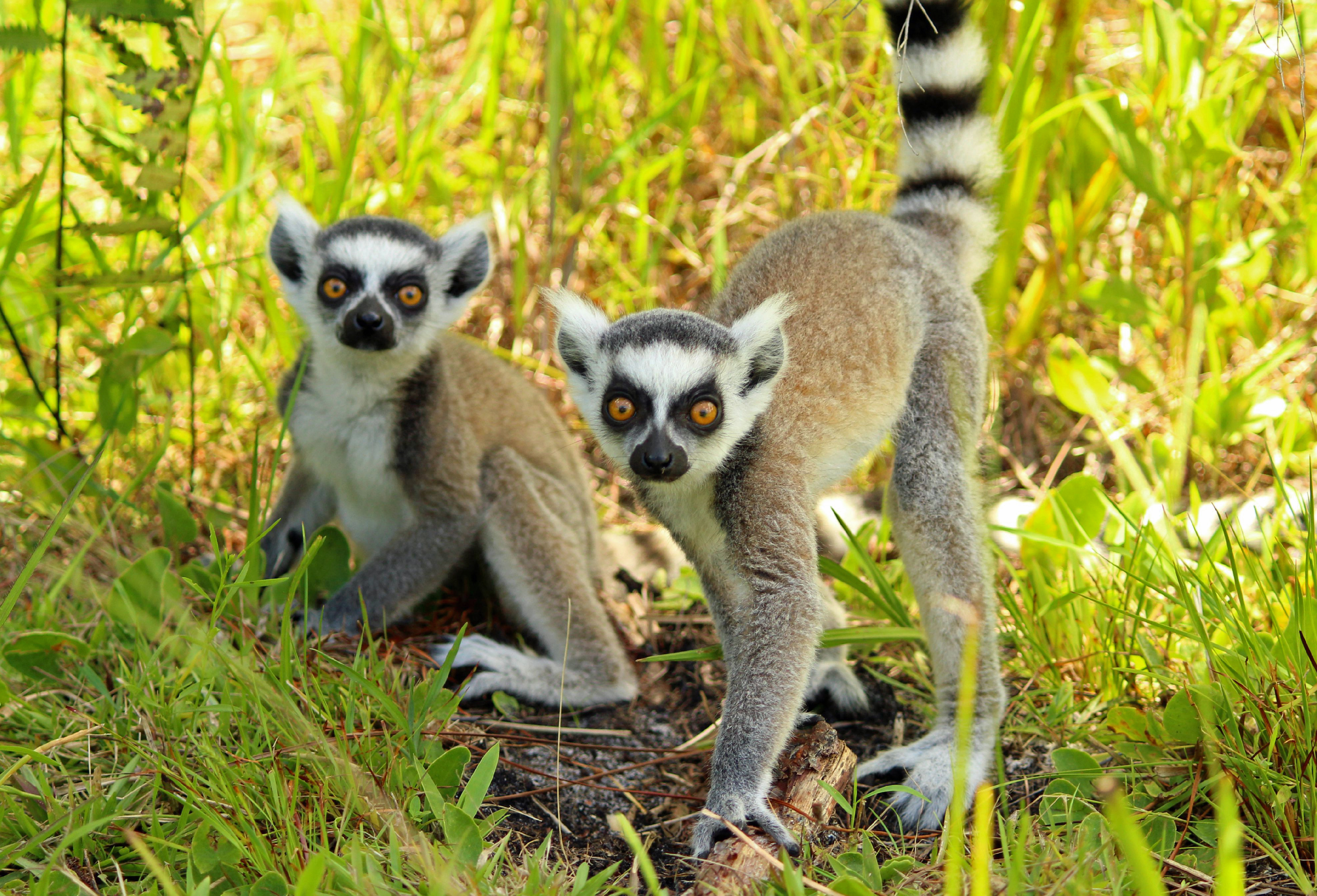
Ring-tailed lemurs at the Myakka City reserve

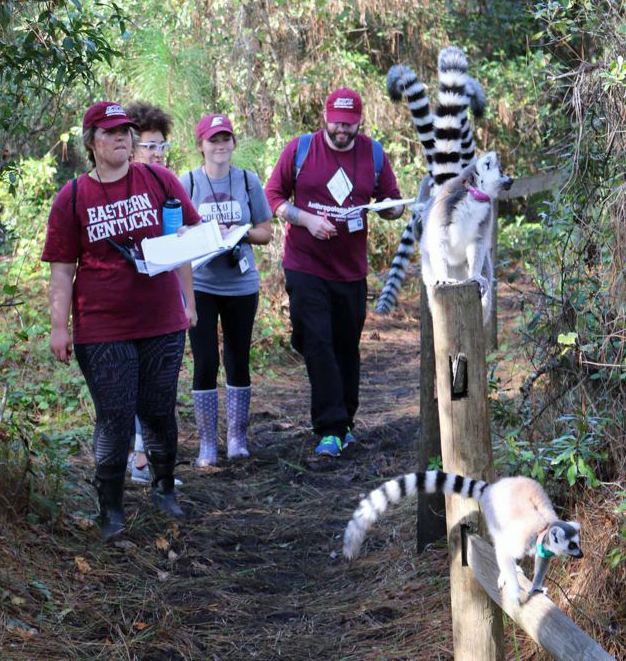
Educational opportunities for students by the foundation take place at both the Myakka City reserve and in Madagascar.

The first 11 lemur residents of the reserve in Myakka City arrived in 1999 from the Duke Lemur Center. The Florida-based facility had its opening ceremony in 2000. Two years later, the reserve had its first birth, a mongoose lemur named Alexandro.

Initially, the reserve primarily focused on behavioral research. By 2005, it had grown into a well-established conservation and research institution housing about 20 lemurs in a section bordered by a chain-link fence. The facility was already being utilized by the University of Miami and New College of Florida for training and research. In the summer of 2005, the reserve completed construction on a larger second enclosure.

As of 2016, the foundation owns more than 120 acres (49 ha) where there are two free-range forests of 8 acres (3.2 ha) and 13 acres (5.3 ha) each, with the remaining land serving as native wildlife habitat or buffer zone for the reserve. There were plans to add a third enclosure of about 15 acres (6.1 ha) to include a clinic and a larger quarantine area.

=== Programs in Madagascar ===
LCF operates several community-based conservation initiatives in Madagascar. Home to 11 species of lemurs, the Anjanaharibe-Sud Special Reserve is 108 square miles (280 square kilometers) and 90% primary forest. LCF supports several conservation efforts in the reserve located in a mountainous region of northeastern Madagascar. One such program is Camp Indri ecotourist project named after a species of lemurs. Camp Indri offers educational lessons geared towards children, youths, and adults that teach environmental conservation.

LCF also runs programs aimed at protecting local habitats and curbing deforestation, which included planting 6,000 trees in 2016. LCF also partners with nurses from Marie Stopes Madagascar, a healthcare non-profit, to provide sustainable agriculture training, promote fuel-efficient stoves, ecotourism, and environmental education. In Marojejy National Park in northern Madagascar, LCF brings young students in to teach them about endangered species and threats to their habitat.

== Funding ==
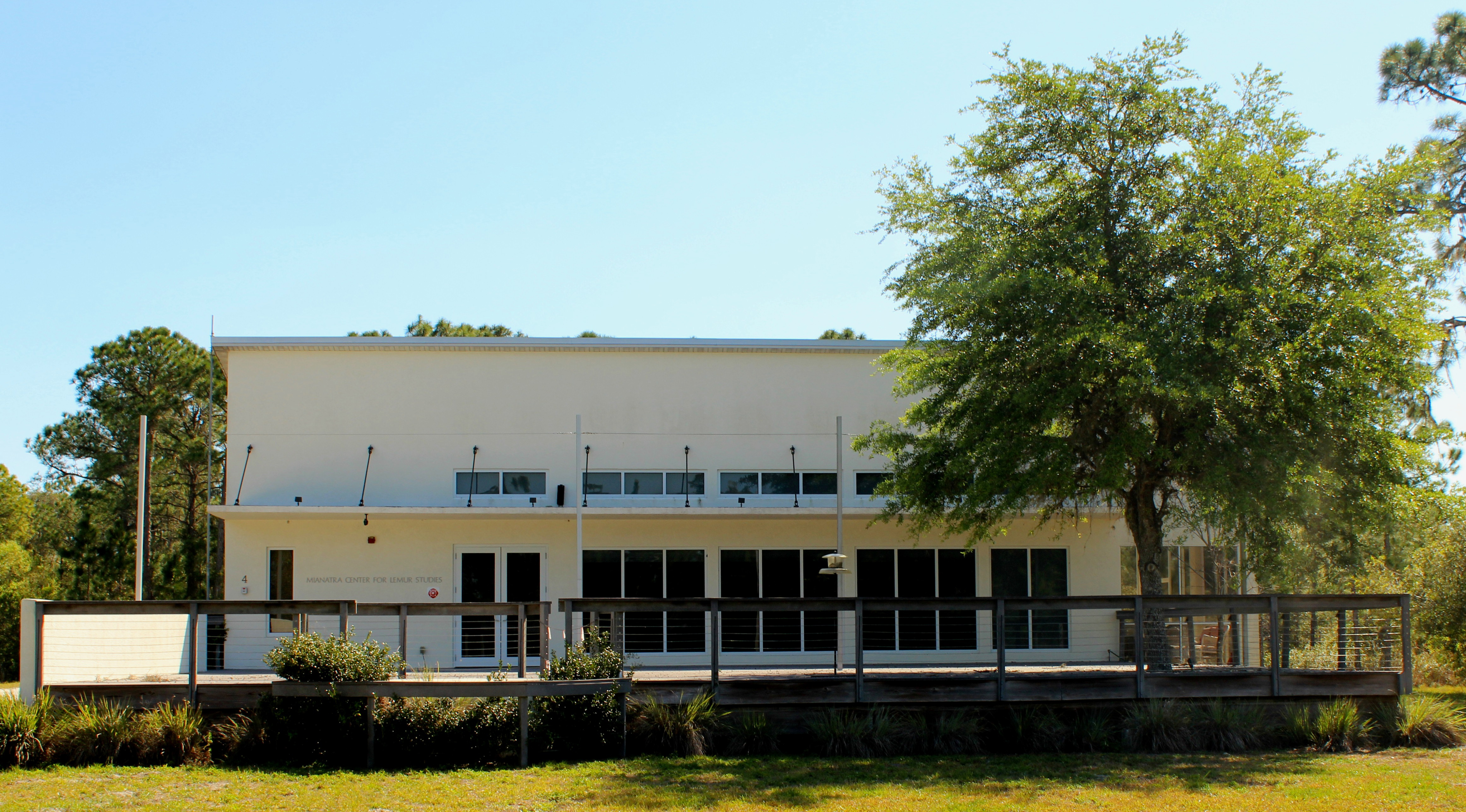
Research facilities and activities have been supported through various funding drives.

In the early 2000s, the foundation collected more than $1.7 million in a fundraising drive. In January 2005, LCF began a new fundraising drive with a goal of $3 million to be used to expand the lemur population to 50 and open the facility to select guests by way of an observation deck. The organization also hoped to supplement its endowment fund, expand the reserves it supported in Madagascar, and add an educational center to its reserve in Myakka City. At the outset of the fundraiser, board members pledged more than half of the goal to match individual contributions.

LCF hosts an annual fund-raising gala in nearby Sarasota, Florida. As of 2018, the foundation's supporters were more than halfway to their most recent goal of raising an additional $2.2 million.
