= Fission–fusion society =

Animal social organization type

In ethology, a fission–fusion society is a social organization in which the size and composition of the group change as time passes and animals move throughout the environment. Such animals merge into a group (fusion)—e.g., sleeping in one place—or split (fission)—e.g., foraging in small groups during the day. Such societies are described in terms of the change in composition, subgroup size, and dispersion of different groups.

This social organization is found in several primates, elephants, cetaceans, ungulates, social carnivores, some birds and some fish.

== Species ==
Fission-fusion societies occur among many species of primates (e.g. chimpanzees, orangutans, and humans), elephants (e.g. forest elephants, African elephants), and bats (e.g. northern long-eared bats).

=== Primates ===
Chimpanzees often form smaller subgroups when traveling between food patches. When obtaining food, the size of subgroups can change depending on how much food is available and how far away the food may be. If food is worth retrieving due to low travel costs, the subgroup size will enlarge.

Orangutans establish travel parties, particularly in a Sumatran forest. Mating opportunities are a large benefit of grouping, as parties are most substantial during high mating activity. Infant socialization also contains benefits as well as costs, due to their needs to be cared for. Females are required to carry their infants, and those with infants of mid-size experience greater costs than those of small sizes. Carrying a small infant does not require much, and they become less dependent as they begin to wean. Mid-sized infants on the other hand, require the most energy. When travelling, females are required to support their mid-sized infants by carrying them, and waiting for them if they have fallen behind.

Humans also form fission–fusion societies. In hunter-gatherer societies, humans form groups which are made up of several individuals that may split up to obtain different resources. Another example of a fission–fusion society in hunter-gatherer societies is communication among the group. Groups may begin to split due to arguments and disagreements. Among humans, gossip and language in general is also an important feature involved in fission–fusion. Communication keeps distant groups together although they may not be within close distances of each other.

=== Elephants ===
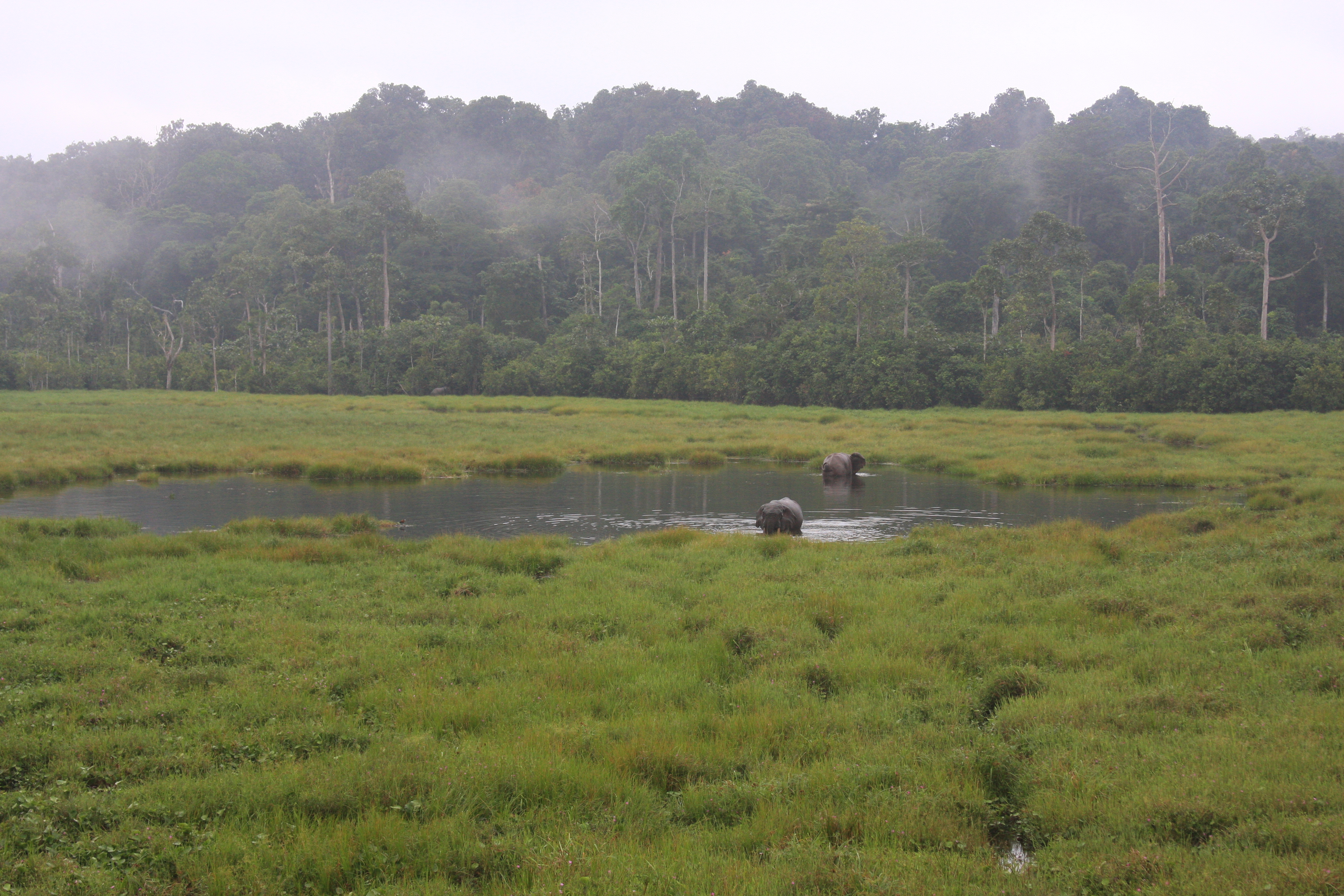
Forest elephants socializing at a clearing

Elephants display grouping as it helps to minimize risks, and enhance benefits. Forest elephants often fuse into larger groups throughout forest clearings, to exchange information and maximize social opportunities. Elephants are drawn to large parties present at forest clearings, and remain in the clearing for a longer period of time if there are individuals outside of their party present. Young African male elephants display a preference for larger groups, in order to communicate with other elephants and to explore dominance. Adolescent males can gain knowledge from adult males and acquire information about their new social methods.

=== Bats ===
Bats are one of the orders of animals which shows an advanced fission–fusion society. Among female northern long-eared bats, switching roosts is common. There are several factors involved when switching roosts, which can include canopy cover and height, decay stage of the roost, and tree height. Geographic regions contribute to the switching of roosts, as females have been shown to switch when temperatures rise in Kentucky, and less when in a colder climate in Nova Scotia. There are also three important behaviours involved in roost-switching, which are fission–fusion grouping, synchronized movement, and settlement behaviour. Settlement behaviour is when bats remain in the most desirable roost possible, synchronized movement is when bats choose to move to another roost in a synchronized manner, and fission–fusion behaviour is when a bat colony separates into sub-colonies which then combine back together to form a large colony. Fission–fusion behaviours among bats is due to the risk of infection. Increased risk of disease can occur from settlement and synchronized behaviours, but fission–fusion societies are capable of reducing the risk of disease because of the frequent separation into subgroups.

== Structure ==
These societies change frequently in their size and composition, making up a permanent social group called the "parent group". Permanent social networks consist of all individual members of a faunal community and often varies to track changes in their environment and based on individual animal dynamics.

In a fission–fusion society, the main parent group can fracture (fission) into smaller stable subgroups or individuals to adapt to environmental or social circumstances. For example, a number of males may break off from the main group in order to hunt or forage for food during the day, but at night they may return to join (fusion) the primary group to share food and partake in other activities.

Overlapping of so-called "parent groups" territorially is also frequent, resulting in more interaction and mingling of community members, further altering the make-up of the parent group. This results in instances where, say, a female chimpanzee may generally belong to one parent group, but encounters a male who belongs to a neighboring community. If they copulate, the female may stay with the male for several days and come into contact with his parent group, temporarily "fusing" into the male's community. In some cases, animals may leave one parent group to associate themselves with another, usually for reproductive reasons.

== See also ==
- Human bonding
- Pair bonding
