= Subfossil lemur =

Lemurs from Madagascar that are represented by recent (subfossil) remains

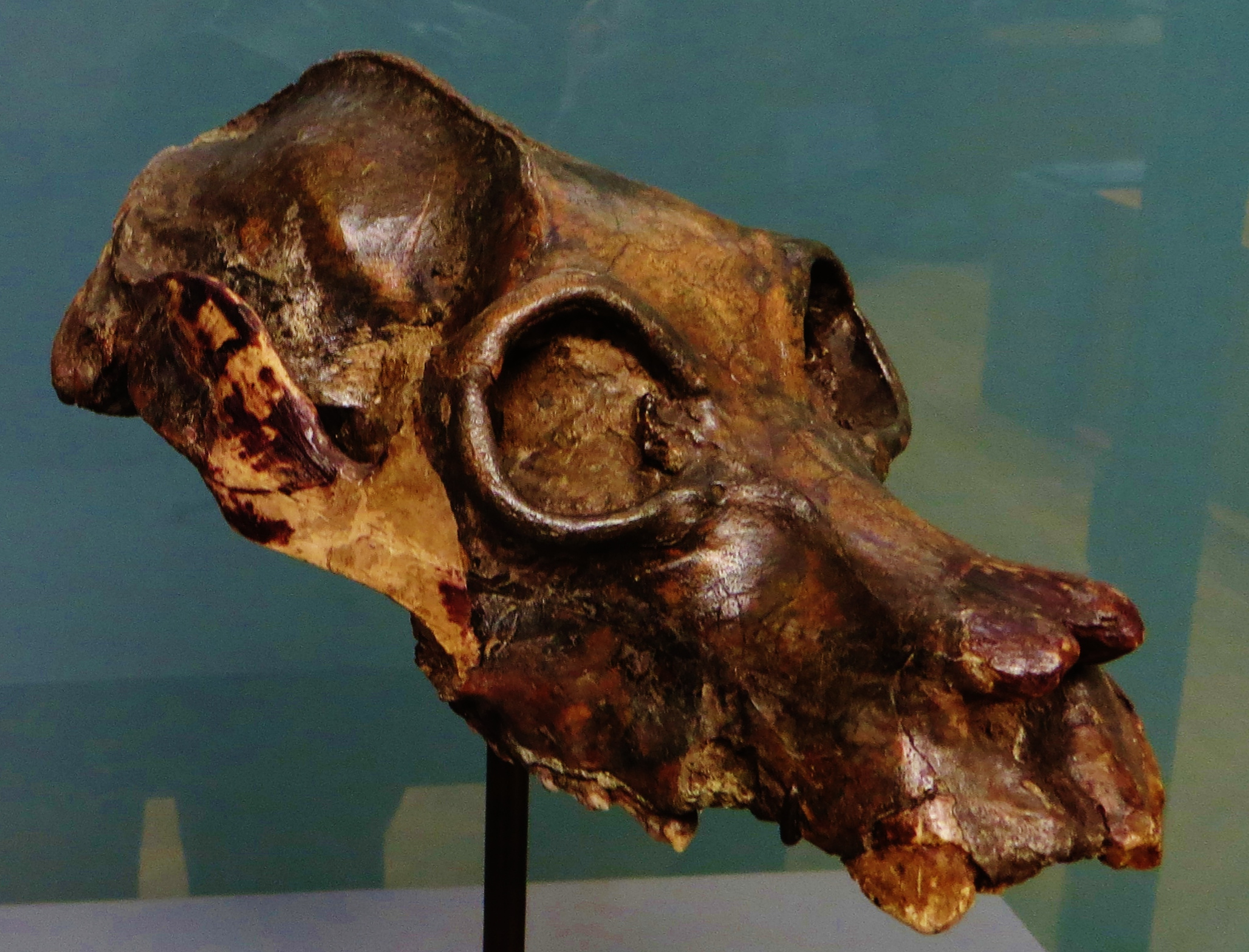
Skull of Palaeopropithecus maximus, an extinct species of sloth lemur

Subfossil lemurs are lemurs from Madagascar that are represented by recent (subfossil) remains dating from nearly 26,000 years ago to approximately 560 years ago (from the late Pleistocene until the Holocene). They include both extant and extinct species, although the term more frequently refers to the extinct giant lemurs. The diversity of subfossil lemur communities was greater than that of present-day lemur communities, ranging to as high as 20 or more species per location, compared with 10 to 12 species today. Extinct species are estimated to have ranged in size from slightly over 10 kg (22 lb) to roughly 160 kg (350 lb). Even the subfossil remains of living species are larger and more robust than the skeletal remains of modern specimens. The subfossil sites found around most of the island demonstrate that most giant lemurs had wide distributions and that ranges of living species have contracted significantly since the arrival of humans.

Despite their size, the giant lemurs shared many features with living lemurs, including rapid development, poor day vision, relatively small brains, and female-dominated hierarchies. They also had many distinct traits among lemurs, including a tendency to rely on terrestrial locomotion, slow climbing, and suspension instead of leaping, as well as a greater dependence on leaf-eating and seed predation. The giant lemurs likely filled ecological niches now left vacant, particularly seed dispersal for plants with large seeds. There were three distinct families of giant lemur, including the Palaeopropithecidae (sloth lemurs), Megaladapidae (koala lemurs), and Archaeolemuridae (monkey lemurs). Two other types were more closely related and similar in appearance to living lemurs: the giant aye-aye and Pachylemur, a genus of "giant ruffed lemurs".

Subfossil remains were first discovered on Madagascar in the 1860s, but giant lemur species were not formally described until the 1890s. The paleontological interest sparked by the initial discoveries resulted in an overabundance of new species names, the allocation of bones to the wrong species, and inaccurate reconstructions during the early 20th century. Discoveries waned during the mid-20th century; paleontological work resumed in the 1980s and resulted in the discovery of new species and a new genus. Research has recently focused on diets, lifestyle, social behavior, and other aspects of biology. The remains of the subfossil lemurs are relatively recent, with all or most species dating within the last 2,000 years. Humans first arrived on Madagascar around that time and hunting likely played a role in the rapid decline of the lemurs and the other megafauna that once existed on the large island. Additional factors are thought to have contributed to their ultimate disappearance. Oral traditions and recent reports of sightings by Malagasy villagers have been interpreted by some as suggesting either lingering populations or very recent extinctions.

== Diversity ==
=== Extinct giant lemurs ===
Until recently, giant lemurs existed in Madagascar. Although they are only represented by subfossil remains, they were modern forms, having adaptations unlike those seen in lemurs today, and are counted as part of the rich lemur diversity that has evolved in isolation for up to 60 million years. All 17 extinct lemurs were larger than the extant forms, including the largest living lemurs, the indri (Indri indri) and diademed sifaka (Propithecus diadema), which weigh up to 9.5 kg (21 lb). The estimated weights for the subfossil lemurs have varied. Techniques used for these weight estimations include the comparison of skull lengths, tooth size, the head diameter of the femur, and more recently, the area of cortical bone (hard bone) in long bones (such as the humerus). Despite the variations in the size estimates for some species, all subfossil lemurs were larger than living species, weighing 10 kg (22 lb) or more, and one species may have weighed as much as 160 kg (350 lb).

All but one species, the giant aye-aye, are thought to have been active during the day. Not only were they unlike the living lemurs in both size and appearance, they also filled ecological niches that no longer exist or are now left unoccupied. Their remains have been found in most parts of the island, except for the eastern rainforests and the Sambirano domain (seasonal moist forests in the northwest of the island), where no subfossil sites are known. Radiocarbon dates for subfossil lemur remains range from approximately 26,000 years BP (for Megaladapis in northern Madagascar at the Ankarana Massif) to around 500 years BP (for Palaeopropithecus in the southwest).

==== Characteristics ====
All of the extinct subfossil lemurs, including the smallest species (Pachylemur, Mesopropithecus, and the giant aye-aye), were larger than the lemur species alive today. The largest species were among the largest primates ever to have evolved. Due to their larger size, the extinct subfossil lemurs have been compared to large-bodied anthropoids (monkeys and apes), yet they more closely resemble the small-bodied lemurs. Like other lemurs, the subfossil lemurs did not exhibit appreciable differences in body or canine tooth size between males and females (sexual dimorphism). This suggests that they, too, exhibited female social dominance, possibly exhibiting the same levels of agonism (aggressive competition) seen in extant lemurs. Like other lemurs, they had smaller brains than comparably sized anthropoids. Most species also had a unique strepsirrhine dental trait, called a toothcomb, which is used for grooming. Even tooth development and weaning was rapid compared to similarly sized anthropoids, suggesting faster sexual maturity of their offspring. Most subfossil lemurs also had high retinal summation (sensitivity to low light), resulting in poor day vision (low visual acuity) compared to anthropoids. This has been demonstrated by the ratio between their relatively small orbits (eye sockets) and the relative size of their optic canal, which is comparable to that of other lemurs, not diurnal anthropoids.

These traits are shared among both living and extinct lemurs, but are uncommon among primates in general. Two prevailing hypotheses to explain these unique adaptations are the energy frugality hypothesis by Patricia Wright (1999) and the evolutionary disequilibrium hypothesis by Carel van Schaik and Peter M. Kappeler (1996). The energy frugality hypothesis expanded on Alison Jolly's energy conservation hypotheses by claiming that most lemur traits not only help conserve energy, but also maximize the use of highly limited resources, enabling them to live in severely seasonal environments with low productivity. The evolutionary disequilibrium hypothesis postulated that living lemurs are in the process of evolving to fill open ecological niches left by the recently extinct subfossil lemurs. For example, small nocturnal prosimians are typically nocturnal and monogamous, while the larger living lemurs are generally active both day and night (cathemeral) and live in small groups (gregarious). Cathemerality and increased gregariousness might indicate that the larger living lemurs are evolving to fill the role of the giant lemurs, which were thought to be diurnal (day-living) and more monkey-like in behavior. Since most giant subfossil lemurs have been shown to share many of the unique traits of their living counterparts, and not those of monkeys, Godfrey et al. (2003) argued that the energy frugality hypothesis seems to best explain both living and extinct lemur adaptations.

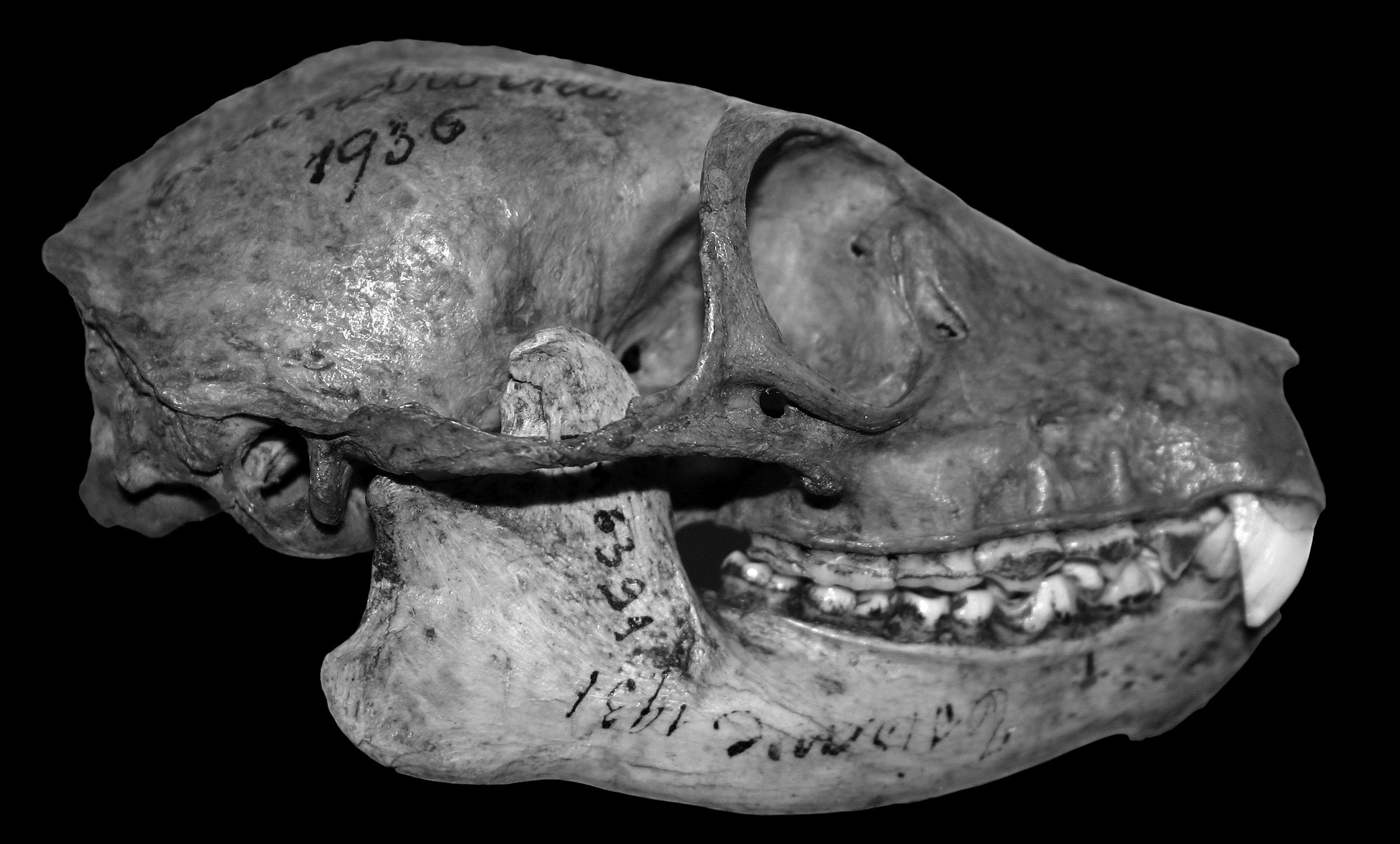
The skull and teeth of Pachylemur insignis suggest that it ate mostly fruit and some leaves.

Despite the similarities, subfossil lemurs had several distinct differences from their lemur relatives. In addition to being larger, the subfossil lemurs were more dependent on leaves and seeds in their diet, rather than fruit. They utilized slow climbing, hanging, and terrestrial quadrupedalism for locomotion, rather than vertical clinging and leaping and arboreal quadrupedalism. Also, all but one of them—the giant aye-aye—are assumed to have been diurnal (due to their body size and small orbits), whereas many small lemurs are nocturnal and medium-sized are cathemeral.

Their skeletons suggest that most subfossil lemurs were tree-dwellers, adapted for living in forests and possibly limited to such habitats. Unlike some of the living species, the subfossil lemurs lacked adaptations for leaping. Instead, suspension, used by some indriids and ruffed lemurs, was extensively used in some lineages. Living lemurs are known to visit the ground to varying extents, but only the extinct archaeolemurids exhibit adaptations for semiterrestrial locomotion. Due to the size of the extinct subfossil lemurs, all were likely to travel on the ground between trees. They had shorter, more robust limbs, heavily built axial skeletons (trunks), and large heads and are thought to have shared the common lemur trait of low basal metabolic rates, making them slow-moving. Studies of their semicircular canals confirm this assumption, showing that koala lemurs moved slower than orangutans, monkey lemurs were less agile than Old World monkeys, and sloth lemurs exhibited slow movements like those of lorises and sloths.

==== Types ====
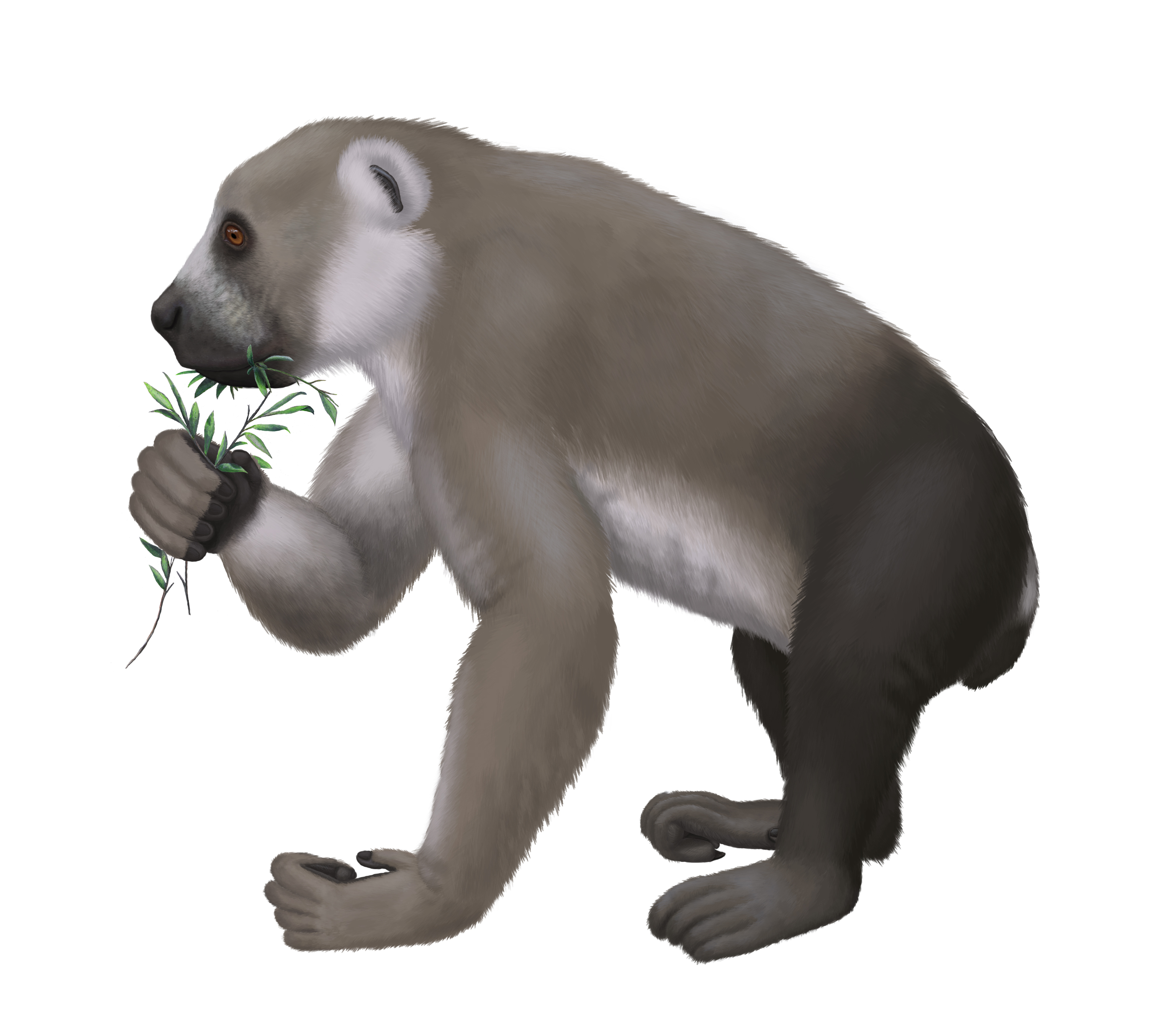
Archaeoindris was the largest of the sloth lemurs, and the largest known lemur. It weighed approximately 160 kg (350 lb).

Sloth lemurs

The sloth lemurs (family Palaeopropithecidae) were the most species-rich group of the subfossil lemurs, with four genera and eight species. The common name is due to strong similarities in morphology with arboreal sloths, or in the case of Archaeoindris, with giant ground sloths. They ranged in size from some of the smallest of the subfossil lemurs, such as Mesopropithecus, weighing as little as 10 kg (22 lb), to the largest, Archaeoindris, weighing approximately 160 kg (350 lb). Their characteristic curved finger and toe bones (phalanges) suggest slow suspensory movement, similar to that of an orangutan or a loris, making them some of the most specialized mammals for suspension. Their day vision was very poor, and they had relatively small brains and short tails. Their diet consisted mostly of leaves, seeds, and fruit; dental wear analysis suggests they were primarily folivorous seed-predators.

Koala lemurs

The koala lemurs of the family Megaladapidae most closely resemble marsupial koalas from Australia. According to genetic evidence they were most closely related to the family Lemuridae, although for many years they were paired with the sportive lemurs of the family Lepilemuridae due to similarities in their skulls and molar teeth. They were slow climbers and had long forelimbs and powerful grasping feet, possibly using them for suspension. Koala lemurs ranged in size from an estimated 45 to 85 kg (99 to 187 lb),. They had poor day vision, short tails, lacked permanent upper incisors, and had a reduced toothcomb. Their diet generally consisted of leaves, with some species being specialized folivores and others having a broader diet, possibly including tough seeds.

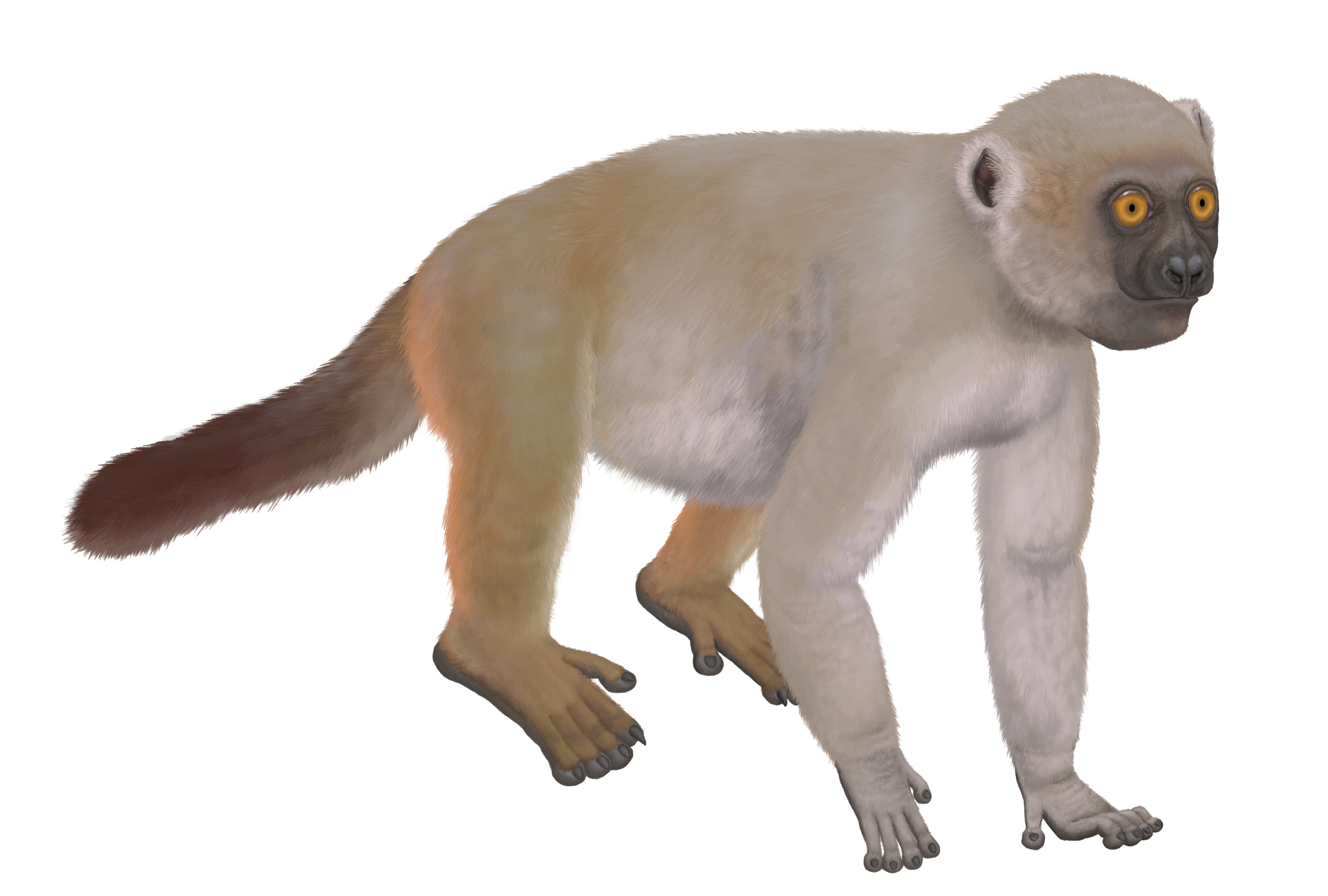
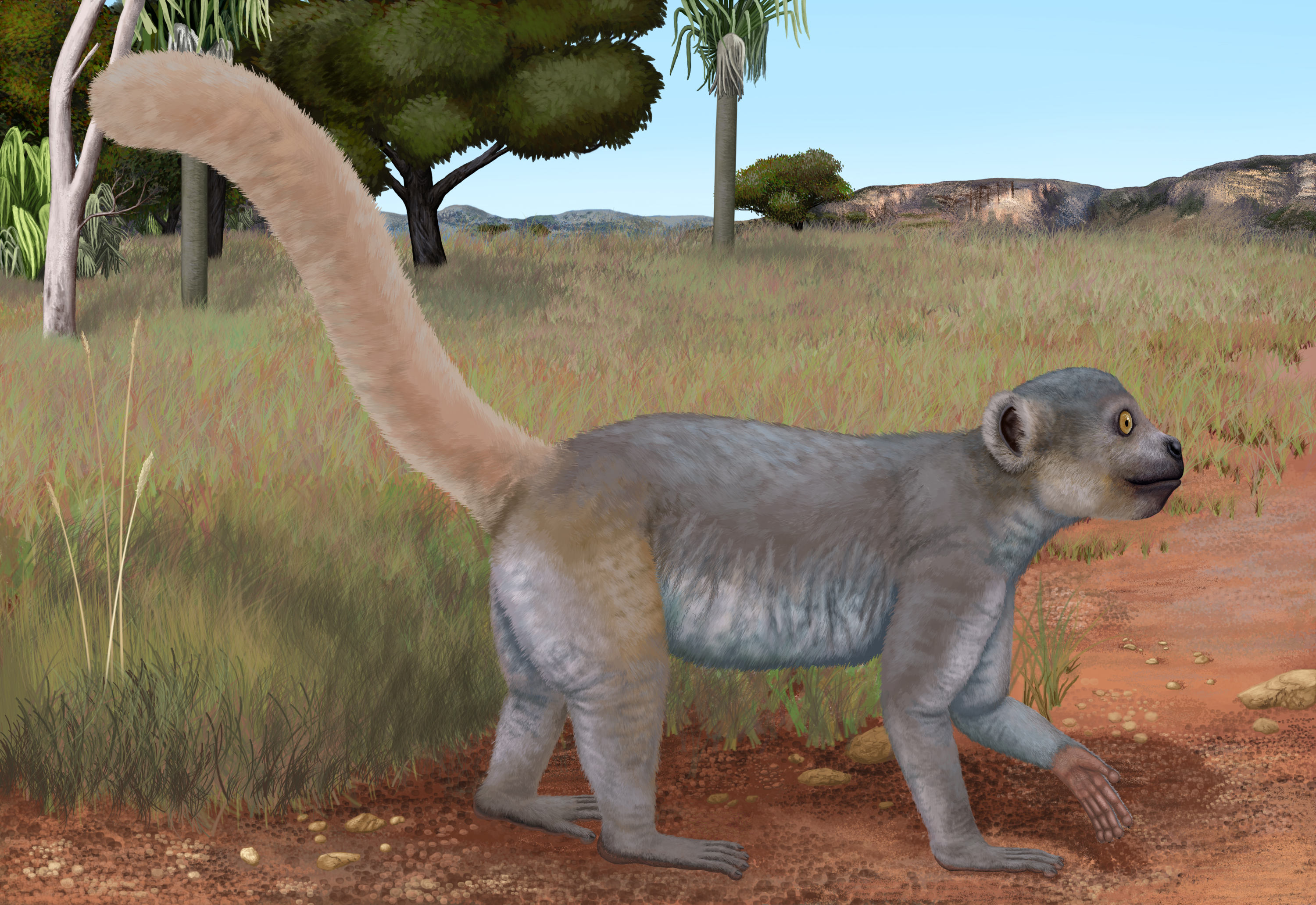
Monkey lemurs, such as Hadropithecus stenognathus (above) and Archaeolemur edwardsi (below), were the most terrestrial of the lemurs.

Monkey lemurs

Monkey lemurs, or baboon lemurs, share similarities with macaques; they have also been compared to baboons. Members of the family Archaeolemuridae, they were the most terrestrial of the lemurs, with short, robust forelimbs and relatively flat digits. They spent time on the ground, and were semi-terrestrial, spending time in trees to feed and sleep. They were heavy-bodied and ranged in size from approximately 13 to 35 kg (29 to 77 lb). They had relatively good day vision and large brains compared with other lemurs. Their robust jaws and specialized teeth suggest a diet of hard objects, such as nuts and seeds, yet other evidence, including fecal pellets, suggests they may have had a more varied diet, including leaves, fruit, and animal matter (omnivory). Dental wear analysis has shed some light on this dietary mystery, suggesting that monkey lemurs had a more eclectic diet, while using tough seeds as a fall-back food item. Within the family, the genus Archaeolemur was the most widespread in distribution, resulting in hundreds of subfossil specimens, and may have been one of the last subfossil lemurs to die out.

Giant aye-aye

An extinct, giant relative of the living aye-aye, the giant aye-aye shared at least two of the aye-aye's bizarre traits: ever-growing central incisors and an elongated, skinny middle finger. These shared features suggest a similar lifestyle and diet, focused on percussive foraging (tapping with the skinny digit and listening for reverberation from hollow spots) of defended resources, such as hard nuts and invertebrate larvae concealed inside decaying wood. Weighing as much as 14 kg (31 lb), it was between two-and-half and five times the size of living aye-aye. Alive when humans came to Madagascar, its teeth were collected and drilled to make necklaces.

Pachylemur

The only extinct member of the family Lemuridae, the genus Pachylemur contains two species that closely resembled living ruffed lemurs. Sometimes referred to as "giant ruffed lemurs", they were approximately three times larger than ruffed lemurs, weighing between 10 and 13 kg (22 and 29 lb). Despite their size, they were arboreal quadrupeds, possibly utilizing more suspensory behavior and cautious climbing than their sister taxon. Their skull and teeth were similar to those of ruffed lemurs, suggesting a diet high in fruit and possibly some leaves. The rest of its skeleton (postcrania) was much more robust and their vertebrae had distinctly different features.

=== Phylogeny ===
Determining the phylogeny of subfossil lemurs has been problematic because studies of morphology, developmental biology, and molecular phylogenetics have sometimes yielded conflicting results. All studies agree that the family Daubentoniidae (including the giant aye-aye) diverged first from the other lemurs at least 60 million years ago. The relationship between the remaining families has been less clear. Morphological, developmental, and molecular studies have offered support for lumping the four sloth lemur genera of the family Palaeopropithecidae with the family Indriidae (including the indri, sifakas, and woolly lemurs). The placement of family Megaladapidae has been more controversial, with similarities in teeth and skull features suggesting a close relationship with family Lepilemuridae (sportive lemurs). Molecular data, instead, indicate a closer relationship to family Lemuridae. Likewise, a relationship between family Archaeolemuridae and family Lemuridae has been suggested, based on morphological and developmental traits, yet molar morphology, the number of teeth in the specialized toothcomb, and molecular analysis support a closer relationship with the indriid–sloth lemur clade. Other subfossil lemurs, including the giant aye-aye and Pachylemur, are more easily placed due to strong similarities with existing lemurs (the aye-aye and ruffed lemurs, respectively).

Subfossil lemur phylogeny

- Lemuriformes
  - Daubentoniidae
    - Daubentonia madagascariensis
    - †Daubentonia robusta
  - - - †Megaladapis
        - †Megaladapis edwardsi
        - †Megaladapis grandidieri
        - †Megaladapis madagascariensis
      - Lemuridae
        - †Pachylemur
          - †Pachylemur insignis
          - †Pachylemur jullyi
        - - Varecia
          - - Lemur, Hapalemur, & Prolemur
            - Eulemur
    - - - Cheirogaleidae (Allocebus, Phaner, Cheirogaleus, Mirza, & Microcebus)
        - Lepilemur
      - - †Archaeolemuridae
          - - †Archaeolemur
              - †Archaeolemur majori
              - †Archaeolemur edwardsi
          - †Hadropithecus stenognathus
        - - †Palaeopropithecidae
            - †Mesopropithecus
              - †Mesopropithecus pithecoides
              - †Mesopropithecus globiceps
              - †Mesopropithecus dolichobrachion
            - - †Babakotia radofilai
              - - †Palaeopropithecus
                  - †Palaeopropithecus maximus
                  - †Palaeopropithecus ingens
                  - †Palaeopropithecus kelyus
                - †Archaeoindris fontoynontii
          - Indriidae (Propithecus, Avahi, & Indri)

=== Living species ===
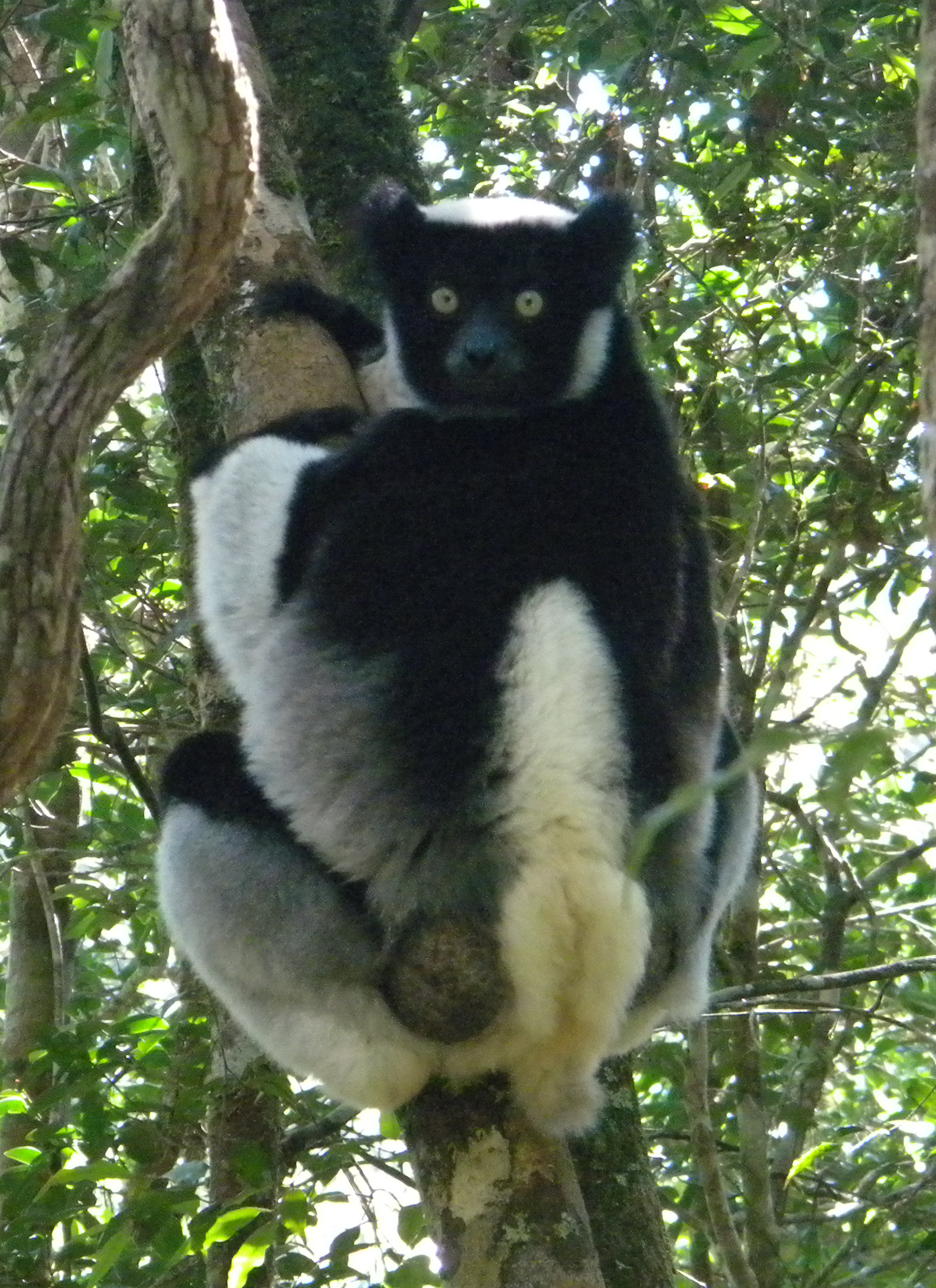
Subfossil remains of the indri (Indri indri) suggest a significant recent reduction in its geographic range.

Subfossil sites in Madagascar have yielded the remains of more than just extinct lemurs. Extant lemur remains have also been found, and radiocarbon dating has demonstrated that both types of lemur lived at the same time. In some cases living species are locally extinct for the area in which their subfossil remains were found. Because subfossil sites are found across most of the island, with the most notable exception being the eastern rainforest, both paleocommunity composition and paleodistributions can be determined. Geographic ranges have contracted for numerous species, including the indri, greater bamboo lemur, and ruffed lemurs. For instance, subfossil remains of the indri have been found in marsh deposits near Ampasambazimba in the Central Highlands and in other deposits in both central and northern Madagascar, demonstrating a much larger range than the small region on the east coast that it currently occupies. Even the greater bamboo lemur, a critically endangered species restricted to a small portion of the south-central eastern rainforest, has undergone significant range contraction since the mid-Holocene, with subfossil remains from Ankarana Massif in the far north of Madagascar dating to 2565 BCE ± 70 years. Combined with finds from other subfossil sites, data suggests that it used to range across the northern, northwestern, central, and eastern parts of the island. It is unclear whether these locations were wetter in the past or whether distinct subpopulations or subspecies occupied the drier forests, much like modern diversity of sifakas.

In addition to previously having expanded geographic ranges, extant subfossil lemurs exhibited significant variation in size. Researchers have noted that subfossil bones of living species are more robust and generally larger than their present-day counterparts. The relative size of living species may be related to regional ecological factors, such as resource seasonality, a trend that is still observable today, where individuals from the spiny forests are, on average, smaller than individuals from the southwestern succulent woodlands or the dry deciduous forests.

== Ecology ==
As a group, the lemurs of Madagascar are extremely diverse, having evolved in isolation and radiated over the past 40 to 60 million years to fill many ecological niches normally occupied by other primates. In the recent past, their diversity was significantly greater, with 17 extinct species sharing body proportions and specializations with lorises and various non-primates, such as tree sloths, giant ground sloths, koalas, and striped possums (genus Dactylopsila). The diversity of lemur communities today can be as high as 10 to 12 species per region; communities of 20 or more lemur species existed as recently as 1,000 years ago in areas that now have no lemurs at all. Just like living species, many of the extinct species shared overlapping ranges with closely related species (sympatry) through niche differentiation (resource partitioning). Among all the late Quaternary assemblages of megafauna, only Madagascar was dominated by large primates.

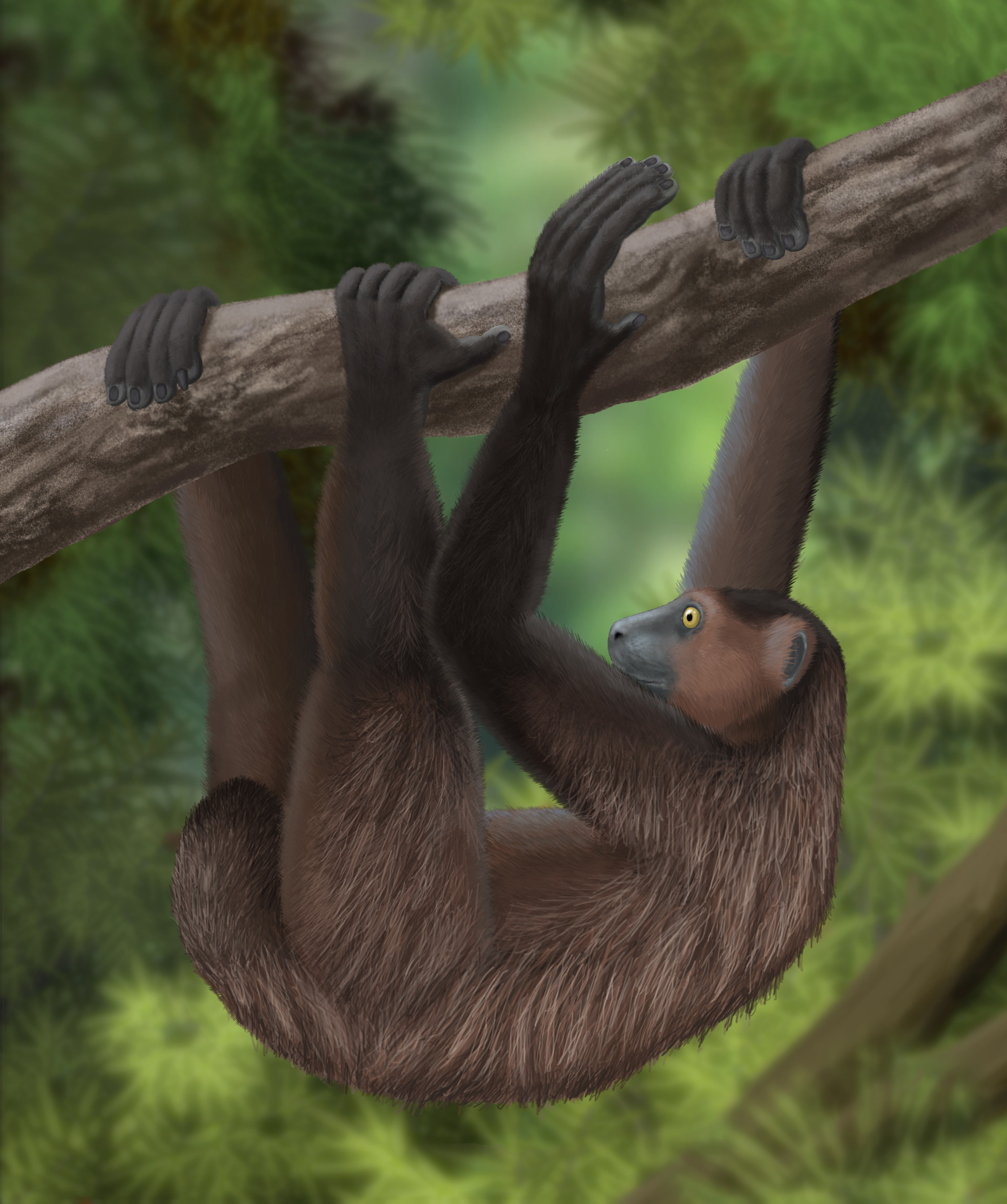
Sloth lemurs, such as Babakotia radofilai, were highly arboreal.

Although anatomical evidence suggests that even the large, extinct species were adapted to tree-climbing, some habitats, including gallery forests and the spiny forests of southern Madagascar, in which they occurred would not have allowed them to be strictly arboreal. Even today, most lemur species will visit the ground to cross open areas, suggesting that the extinct species did the same. Monkey lemurs (family Archaeolemuridae), including Archaeolemur majori and Hadropithecus stenognathus, have been reconstructed as being primarily terrestrial. In contrast, the sloth lemurs (family Palaeopropithecidae) were highly arboreal despite the large size of some species.

Species of both extinct and living (extant) lemur vary in size based on habitat conditions, despite their differences in niche preference. Within related groups, larger species tend to inhabit wetter, more productive habitats, while smaller sister taxa are found in drier, less productive habitats. This pattern suggests that populations of both living and extinct lemur species had become geographically isolated by differences in habitat and evolved in isolation due to varying primary production within different ecosystems. Thermoregulation may also have played a role in the evolution of their increased body size. Yet despite this pressure to specialize and differentiate, some of the extinct subfossil lemurs, such as Archaeolemur, may have had island-wide distributions during the Holocene, unlike the living lemurs. If this is the case, it may suggest that some larger lemurs might have been more tolerant to regional differences in ecology than living lemurs.

=== Diet ===
Research on subfossil lemur diets, particularly in southern and southwestern Madagascar, has indicated that ecological communities have been significantly affected by their recent extinction. Many extinct subfossil lemurs were large-bodied leaf-eaters (folivores), seed predators, or both. Today, leaf-eating along with seed predation is only seen in mid-sized lemurs, and is far less common than it was in the past. Strict folivory is also less common, now found primarily in small lemurs. In certain cases, subfossil lemurs, such as the sloth lemurs and koala lemurs, may have used leaves as an important fallback food, whereas other species, such as the monkey lemurs and the giant aye-aye, specialized on structurally defended resources, such as hard seeds and wood-boring insect larvae. Last, Pachylemur was primarily a fruit eater (frugivorous). Subfossil lemur diets have been reconstructed using analytical tools, including techniques to compare tooth anatomy, structure, and wear; biogeochemistry (analysis of isotope levels, like carbon-13); and the dissection of fecal pellets associated with subfossil remains.

The diets of most subfossil lemurs, most notably Palaeopropithecus and Megaladapis, consisted primarily of C_{3} plants, which use a form of photosynthesis that results in higher water loss through transpiration. Other subfossil lemurs, such as Hadropithecus and Mesopropithecus, fed on CAM and C_{4} plants, which use more water-efficient forms of photosynthesis. Fruit and animal matter was more common in the diets of subfossil lemurs including Pachylemur, Archaeolemur, and the giant aye-aye. In southern and southwestern Madagascar, the subfossil lemurs of the spiny forests generally favored the C_{3} plants over the more abundant CAM plants, although closely related sympatric species may have fed upon the two types of plants in different ratios, allowing each to divide resources and coexist. Since plants produce defenses against leaf-eating animals, the extensive use of spines by plants in the spiny forests suggest that they evolved to cope with leaf-eating lemurs, large and small.

=== Seed dispersal ===
Giant subfossil lemurs are thought to have also played a significant role in seed dispersal, possibly targeting species that did not attract the seed dispersal services of the extinct elephant birds. Biogeochemistry studies have shown that they may have been the primary seed dispersers for the endemic and native C_{3} trees in the spiny forests. Terrestrial species may have dispersed seeds for small bushes as well as tall trees. Seed dispersal can involve passing seeds through the gut (endozoochory) or attaching the seeds to the animal's body (epizoochory), and both processes probably occurred with subfossil lemurs. Seeds from Uncarina species embed themselves in lemur fur, and likely did the same with subfossil lemurs. Seed dispersal biology is known for very few species in the spiny forest, including genera of plants suspected of depending on giant lemurs, such as Adansonia, Cedrelopsis, Commiphora, Delonix, Diospyros, Grewia, Pachypodium, Salvadora, Strychnos, and Tamarindus. For example, Delonix has edible pods that are rich in protein, and Adansonia fruits have a nutritious pulp and large seeds that may have been dispersed by Archaeolemur majori or Pachylemur insignis.

Seed size may be a limiting factor for some plant species, since their seeds are too large for living (extant) lemurs. The common brown lemur (Eulemur fulvus) can swallow seeds 20 mm (0.79 in) in diameter, while the black-and-white ruffed lemur (Varecia variegata) is capable of swallowing seeds up to 30 mm (1.2 in) in diameter. A large lemur, such as Pachylemur, which was more than twice the size of today's ruffed lemurs, could probably swallow even larger seeds. Seed dispersal limitations tied to megafaunal extinction are exhibited by Commiphora guillaminii. At present, this tree species has a short dispersal distance, but its genetics indicate higher levels of regional gene flow in the past, based on comparisons with a closely related species in Africa whose seeds are still dispersed by large animals.

== Discovery and research ==
The writings of French colonial governor Étienne de Flacourt in the mid-17th century introduced the existence of giant Malagasy mammals to Western science with recorded eye-witness accounts from the local people of dangerous animals, hornless "water cows", and a large lemur-like creature referred to locally as the tretretretre or tratratratra. Today, the latter is thought to have been a species of Palaeopropithecus or possibly Megaladapis. Flacourt described it as:

An animal as big as a two-year-old calf, with a round head and a human face: the front feet are monkeylike, and the rear ones as well. It has frizzy hair, a short tail, and humanlike ears. ... One has been seen near Lake Lipomami, around which it lives. It is a very solitary animal; the local people fear it greatly and flee from it as it does from them.

— Étienne de Flacourt, Histoire de la Grande Isle Madagascar, 1658

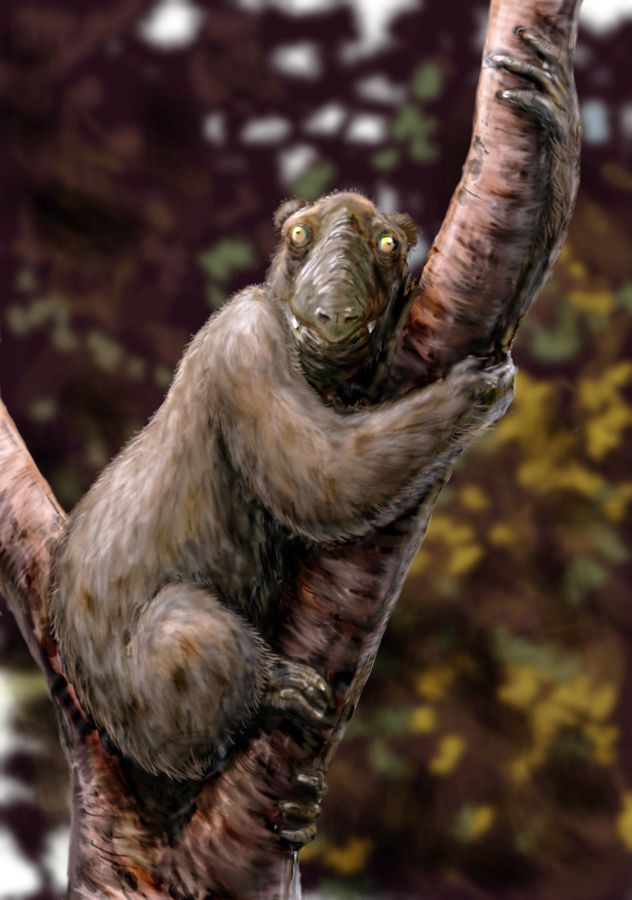
Early depictions of subfossil lemurs, such as this one of Megaladapis madagascariensis (top) from 1902, were based on inaccurate reconstructions due to confused pairing of skeletal remains. Modern reconstructions, such as this one of M. edwardsi (bottom), are much more accurate.

Local tales of a song'aomby (Malagasy for 'cow that is not a cow'), or pygmy hippopotamus, led French naturalist Alfred Grandidier to follow a village headman to a marsh in southwestern Madagascar, a site called Ambolisatra, which became the first known subfossil site in Madagascar. In 1868, Grandidier uncovered the first subfossil remains of lemurs—a humerus from Palaeopropithecus and a tibia of a sifaka. The Palaeopropithecus remains were not described for several decades, and it took decades more for the remains to be correctly paired with other sloth lemur remains. It was not until 1893 that giant lemur species were formally described, when Charles Immanuel Forsyth Major discovered and described a long, narrow skull of Megaladapis madagascariensis in a marsh. His discoveries in various marshes of central and southwestern Madagascar sparked paleontological interest, resulting in an overabundance of taxonomic names and confused assemblages of bones from numerous species, including non-primates. Specimens were distributed between European museums and Madagascar, often resulting in the loss of field data that went with the specimens, if the data had been recorded at all.

In 1905, Alfred Grandidier's son, Guillaume Grandidier, reviewed subfossil lemur taxonomy and determined that too many names had been created. His review established most of the presently known family and genera names for the extinct lemurs. Despite the taxonomic clarification, subfossil postcrania from different genera, particularly Megaladapis, Palaeopropithecus and Hadropithecus, continued to be incorrectly paired and sometimes assigned to non-primates. Since subfossil remains were often dredged from marshes one by one, pairing skulls with other bones was often guesswork based on size-matching, and was not very accurate as a consequence. Even as late as the 1950s, bones of non-primates were attributed to subfossil lemurs. One reconstruction of the confounded subfossil remains by paleontologist Herbert F. Standing depicted Palaeopropithecus as an aquatic animal that swam near the surface, keeping its eyes, ears, and nostrils slightly above water. Postcranial remains of Palaeopropithecus had previously been paired with Megaladapis by Guillaume Grandidier, who viewed it as a giant tree sloth, which he named Bradytherium. Standing's aquatic theory was supported by Italian paleontologist Giuseppe Sera, who reconstructed Palaeopropithecus as an "arboreal-aquatic acrobat" that not only swam in water but climbed trees and dove from there into the water. Sera took the aquatic theory further in 1938 by including other extinct lemurs, including Megaladapis, which he viewed as a thin ray-like swimmer that fed on mollusks and crustaceans while concealed underwater. It was primarily the paleontologist Charles Lamberton who correctly paired many of the confused subfossils, although others had also helped address problems of association and taxonomic synonyms. Lamberton also refuted Guillaume Grandidier's sloth theory for Megaladapis, as well as the aquatic lemur theory of Standing and Sera.

Excavations during the early 20th century by researchers like Lamberton failed to unearth any new extinct lemur genera. Fourteen of the approximately seventeen known species had previously been identified from field work in southern, western, and central Madagascar. When paleontological field work resumed in the early 1980s, new finds provided associated skeletal remains, including rare bones such as carpal bones (wrist bones), phalanges (finger and toe bones), and bacula (penile bone). In some cases, nearly complete hands and feet were found. Enough remains have been found for some groups to demonstrate the physical development of juveniles. Standard long-bone indices have been calculated in order to determine the intermembral index (a ratio that compares limb proportions), and body mass estimates have been made based on long-bone circumference measurements. Even preserved fecal pellets from Archaeolemur have been found, allowing researchers to learn about its diet. More recently, electron microscopy has allowed researchers to study behavioral patterns, and DNA amplification has helped with genetic tests that determine the phylogenetic relationships between the extinct and living lemurs.

A new genus of sloth lemur, Babakotia, was discovered in 1986 by a team led by Elwyn L. Simons of Duke University in karst caves on the Ankarana Massif in northern Madagascar. Along with Babakotia, a new species of Mesopropithecus, M. dolichobrachion, was also discovered, but not formally described until 1995. The same team has also helped promote new ideas about sloth lemur adaptations and the relationships among the four genera. They have also provided evidence that living species, such as the indri and the greater bamboo lemur, have lost much of their original range. In 2009, a new species of large sloth lemur, called Palaeopropithecus kelyus, was described from northwestern Madagascar by a Franco-Madagascan team. The new species was found to be smaller than the two previously known species from the genus, and its diet reportedly consisted of more hard-textured food. The resurgence in subfossil lemur work has also sparked new interest in Madagascar's small mammals, which have also been found at the subfossil sites. This has led to new ideas about the origins, diversity, and distribution of these animals.

The number of Malagasy subfossil sites containing subfossil lemurs has increased significantly since the mid-20th century. At that time, subfossil lemurs had only been found in the center, south, and southwest of the island. Since then, only the eastern rainforests have not been represented, and paleodistributions are now known for both extinct and living species around most of the island. Large quantities of subfossil lemur remains have been found in caves, marshes, and streambank sites in drier regions. The subfossil sites are clustered together geographically and are recent in age, mostly dating between 2,500 and 1,000 years old, with a few spanning back into the last glaciation, which ended 10,000 years ago.

== Extinction ==
At least 17 species of giant subfossil lemur vanished during the Holocene, with all or most extinctions happening after the colonization of Madagascar by humans around 2,000 years ago. Madagascar's megafauna included not only giant lemurs, but also elephant birds, giant tortoises, several species of Malagasy hippopotamuses, Cryptoprocta spelea (a "giant fossa"), large crocodiles (Voay robustus), and Plesiorycteropus, a unique digging mammal, all of which died out during the same period. Madagascar's megafaunal extinctions were among the most severe for any continent or large island, with all endemic wildlife over 10 kg (22 lb) disappearing, totaling approximately 25 species. The most severely impacted lemurs were generally large and diurnal, particularly the clade containing the living indriids and extinct sloth lemurs. Although only the indriids are alive today and represent only a small percentage of the living lemur species, this clade collectively contained the majority of the extinct giant lemur species.

Radiocarbon dating of multiple subfossil specimens shows that the giant subfossil lemurs were present on the island until after human arrival.

By region, the Central Highlands lost the greatest number of lemur species. It has lost nearly all of its woodland habitat, but some lemur species still survive in isolated forest patches. Lemur diversity is tightly linked with plant diversity, which in turn decreases with increased forest fragmentation. In extreme cases, treeless sites such as the town of Ampasambazimba from the central region no longer support any of the lemur species represented in their subfossil record. Other locations no longer have giant subfossil lemurs, yet they still maintain forested habitat that could support them. Even though the giant lemurs have disappeared from these locations, while the smaller species survive in the forest patches that remain, the subfossil remains indicate that the living species used to be more widespread and coexisted with the extinct species. The Central Highlands saw the greatest species loss, but was not the only region or habitat type to witness extinctions. The least-understood region is the eastern rainforests, which have not yielded subfossil lemur remains. Consequently, it is impossible to know what percentage of lemur taxa were recently lost there; studies of Malagasy customs (ethnohistory) along with archaeological evidence suggests the eastern rainforests were more ecologically disturbed in the past than they are today. Hunting and trapping by humans may have severely impacted large lemurs in this region as well.

Comparisons of species counts from subfossil deposits and remnant populations in neighboring Special Reserves has further demonstrated decreased diversity in lemur communities and contracted geographic ranges. At Ampasambazimba in central Madagascar, 20 species of subfossil lemur have been found. At nearby Ambohitantely Reserve, only 20% of those species still survive. Only six of 13 species found at Ankilitelo and Ankomaka Caves in the southwest still survive at Beza Mahafaly Reserve. In the extreme north, the caves of Ankarana have yielded 19 species, yet only nine remain in the surrounding forests. In the northwest, 10 or 11 subfossil species have been found at Anjohibe, whereas only six species remain at nearby Ankarafantsika National Park.

As with the extinctions that occurred on other land masses during the late Pleistocene and Holocene (known as the Quaternary extinction event), the disappearance of Madagascar's megafauna is tightly linked with the arrival of humans, with nearly all extinctions dating to around the same time of the earliest evidence of human activity on the island or significantly later. The exact date of human arrival is unknown; a radius (arm bone) of a Palaeopropithecus ingens with distinct cut marks from the removal of flesh with sharp objects dates to 2325 ± 43 BP (2366–2315 cal yr BP). Based on this evidence from Taolambiby in the southwest interior, as well as other dates for human-modified dwarf hippo bones and introduced plant pollen from other parts of the island, the arrival of humans is conservatively estimated at 350 BCE. Measurements of stratigraphic charcoal and the appearance of exotic plant pollen dated from Holocene core samples confirm these approximated dates for human arrival in the southwestern corner of the island and further suggest that the central and northern parts of the island did not experience significant human impact until 700 to 1,500 years later. The humid forests of the lower interior of the island were the last to be settled (as shown by the presence of charcoal particles), possibly due to the prevalence of human diseases, such as plague, malaria, and dysentery. The entire island was not fully colonized by humans until the beginning of the second millennium CE.

The extinction of Madagascar's megafauna, including the giant lemurs, was one of the most recent in history, with large lemur species like Palaeopropithecus ingens surviving until approximately 500 years ago and one bone of the extinct Hippopotamus laloumena radiocarbon dated to about 100 years BP. An even wider extinction window for the subfossil lemurs, ranging up until the 20th century, may be possible if reports of unidentified animals are true. As recently as the early 17th century, dwindling populations of subfossil lemurs may have persisted in coastal regions where tree-cutting and uncontrolled fires had less of an impact. By that date, the Central Highlands' forests were mostly gone, with the exception of scattered forest fragments and strips. Along the northwest coast, forms such as Archaeolemur may have survived for more than a millennium after the arrival of humans. This is supported by radiocarbon dates for Archaeolemur from the Ankarana Massif dating to 975 ± 50 CE as well as archaeological data that show there was little human activity in the area until a few centuries ago, with low human population density along the northwest coast until nearly 1500 CE.

=== Hypotheses ===
In the 20th century, six hypotheses for explaining the extinction of the giant subfossil lemurs have been proposed and tested. They are known as the "Great Fire", "Great Drought", "Blitzkrieg", "Biological Invasion", "Hypervirulent Disease", and "Synergy" hypotheses. The first was proposed in 1927 when Henri Humbert and other botanists working in Madagascar suspected that human-introduced fire and uncontrolled burning intended to create pasture and fields for crops transformed the habitats quickly across the island. In 1972, Mahé and Sourdat proposed that the arid south had become progressively drier, slowly killing off lemur fauna as the climate changed. Paul S. Martin applied his overkill hypothesis or "blitzkrieg" model to explain the loss of the Malagasy megafauna in 1984, predicting a rapid die-off as humans spread in a wave across the island, hunting the large species to extinction. That same year, Robert Dewar speculated that introduced livestock outcompeted the endemic wildlife in a moderately fast series of multiple waves across the island. In 1997, MacPhee and Marx speculated that a rapid spread of hypervirulent disease might explain the die-offs that occurred after the appearance of humans worldwide, including Madagascar. Finally, in 1999, David Burney proposed that the complete set of human impacts worked together, in some cases along with natural climate change, and very slowly (i.e., on a time scale of centuries to millennia) brought about the demise of the giant subfossil lemurs and other recently extinct endemic wildlife.

Since all extinct lemurs were larger than the ones that currently survive, and the remaining large forests still support large populations of smaller lemurs, large size appears to have conveyed some distinct disadvantages. Large-bodied animals require larger habitats in order to maintain viable populations, and are most strongly impacted by habitat loss and fragmentation. Large folivores typically have slower reproductive rates, live in smaller groups, and have low dispersal rates (vagility), making them especially vulnerable to habitat loss, hunting pressure, and possibly disease. Large, slow-moving animals are often easier to hunt and provide a larger amount of food than smaller prey. Leaf-eating, large-bodied slow climbers, and semiterrestrial seed predators and omnivores disappeared completely, suggesting an extinction pattern based on habitat use.

Since the subfossil bones of extinct lemurs have been found alongside the remains of highly arboreal living lemur species, we know that much of Madagascar had been covered in forest prior to the arrival of humans; the forest coverage of the high plateau region has been debated. Humbert and other botanists suggested that the central plateau had once been blanketed in forest, later to be destroyed by fire for use by humans. Recent paleoenvironmental studies by Burney have shown that the grasslands of that region have fluctuated over the course of millennia and were not entirely created by humans. Similarly, the role humans played in the aridification of the south and southwest has been questioned, since natural drying of the climate started before human arrival. The marshes of the region (in which subfossil remains have been found) have dried up, subfossil sites have yielded a host of arboreal lemurs, and site names, such as Ankilitelo ('place of three kily or tamarind trees') suggest a recent wetter past. Pollen studies have shown that the aridification process began nearly 3,000 years ago, and peaked 1,000 years prior to the time of the extinctions. No extinctions occurred prior to the arrival of humans, and the recent climatic changes have not been as severe as those prior to human arrival, suggesting that humans and their effect on the vegetation did play a role in the extinctions. The central plateau lost more species than the dry south and southwest, suggesting that degraded habitats were more affected than arid habitats.

Over-hunting by humans has been one of the most widely accepted hypotheses for the ultimate demise of the subfossil lemurs. The extinctions and human hunting pressure are associated due to the synchronicity of human arrival and species decline, as well as the suspected naïveté of the Malagasy wildlife during the early encounters with human hunters. Despite the assumptions, evidence of butchery has been minimal until recently, although folk memories of rituals associated with the killing of megafauna have been reported. Archeological evidence for butchery of giant subfossil lemurs, including Palaeopropithecus ingens and Pachylemur insignis, was found on specimens from two sites in southwestern Madagascar, Taolambiby and Tsirave. The bones had been collected in the early 20th century and lacked stratigraphic records; one of the bones with tool marks had been dated to the time of the first arrival of humans. Tool-induced bone alterations, in the form of cuts and chop marks near joints and other characteristic cuts and fractures, indicated the early human settlers skinned, disarticulated, and filleted giant lemurs. Prior to these finds, only modified bones of dwarf hippos and elephant birds, as well as giant aye-aye teeth, had been found.

Although there is evidence that habitat loss, hunting, and other factors played a role in the demise of the subfossil lemurs, prior to the synergy hypothesis, each had its own discrepancies. Humans may have hunted the giant lemurs for food, but no signs of game-dependent butchery have been found. Madagascar was colonized by Iron-age pastoralists, horticulturalists, and fishermen, not big-game hunters. The blitzkrieg hypothesis predicts extinction within 100 and 1,000 years as humans sweep across the island, yet humans lived alongside the giant lemurs for more than 1,500 years. Alternatively, habitat loss and deforestation have been argued against because many giant lemurs were thought to be terrestrial, they are missing from undisturbed forested habitats, and their environment was not fully forested prior to the arrival of humans. Anthropologist Laurie Godfrey defended the effects of habitat loss by pointing out that most of the extinct lemurs have been shown to have been at least partly arboreal and dependent upon leaves and seeds for food, and also that these large-bodied specialists would be most vulnerable to habitat disturbance and fragmentation due to their low reproductive resilience and their need for large, undisturbed habitats. Still, much of the island remained covered in forest, even into the 20th century.

Linking human colonization to a specific cause for extinction has been difficult since human activities have varied from region to region. No single human activity can account for the extinction of the giant subfossil lemurs, but humans are still regarded as being primarily responsible. Each of the contributing human-caused factors played a role (having a synergistic effect) in varying degrees. The most widespread and adaptable species, such as Archaeolemur, were able to survive despite hunting pressure and human-caused habitat change until human population growth and other factors reached a tipping point, cumulatively resulting in their extinction.

=== Extinction timeline and the primary trigger ===
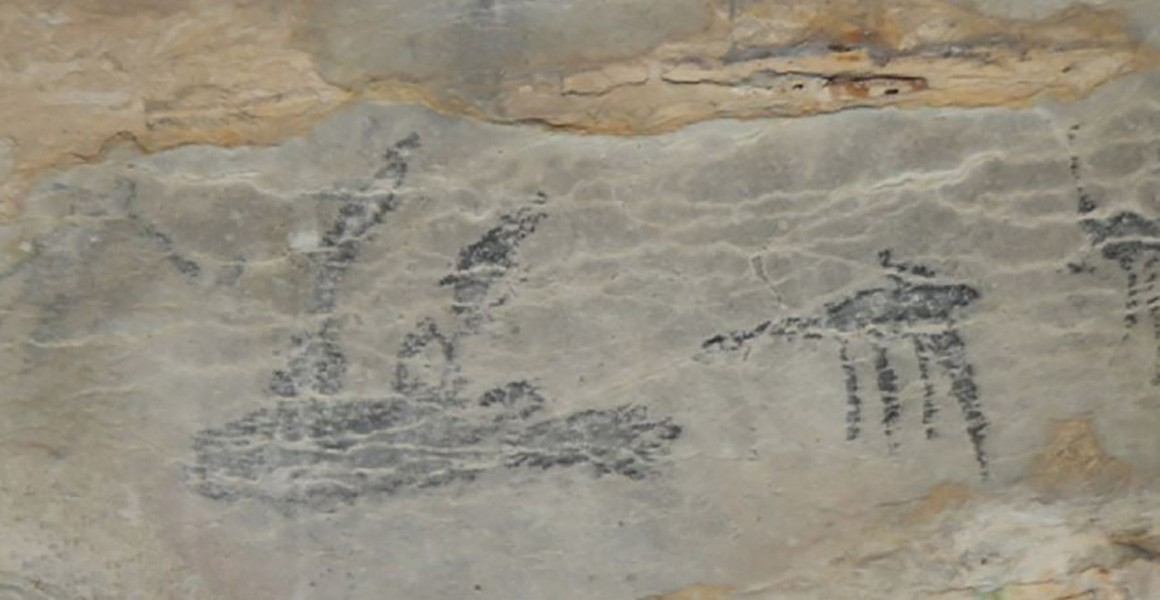
Hunting scene depicting a human (far left) and a sloth lemur (centre left) alongside two hunting dogs (right) from Andriamamelo Cave in western Madagascar

While it is generally agreed that both human and natural factors contributed to the subfossil lemur extinction, studies of sediment cores have helped to clarify the general timeline and initial sequence of events. Spores of the coprophilous fungus, Sporormiella, found in sediment cores experienced a dramatic decline shortly after the arrival of humans. Since this fungus cannot complete its life cycle without dung from large animals, its decline also indicates a sharp decline in giant subfossil lemur populations, as well as other large herbivores, starting around 230–410 cal yr CE. Following the decline of megafauna, the presence of charcoal particles increased significantly, starting in the southwest corner of the island, gradually spreading to the other coasts and the island's interior over the next 1,000 years. The first evidence for the introduction of cattle to the island dates to 1,000 years after the initial decline of coprophilous fungal spores.

The loss of grazers and browsers might have resulted in the accumulation of excessive plant material and litter, promoting more frequent and destructive wildfires, which would explain the rise in charcoal particles following the decline in coprophilous fungus spores. This in turn resulted in ecological restructuring through the elimination of the wooded savannas and preferred arboreal habitats on which the giant subfossil lemurs depended. This left their populations at unsustainably low levels, and factors such as their slow reproduction, continued habitat degradation, increased competition with introduced species, and continued hunting (at lower levels, depending on the region) prevented them from recovering and gradually resulted in their extinction.

Hunting is thought to have caused the initial rapid decline, referred to as the primary trigger, although other explanations may be plausible. In theory, habitat loss should affect frugivores more than folivores, since leaves are more widely available. Both large-bodied frugivores and large-bodied folivores disappeared simultaneously, while smaller species remained. Other large non-primate grazers also disappeared around the same time. Consequently, large body size has been shown to have the strongest link to the extinctions—more so than activity patterns or diet. Since large animals are more attractive as prey, fungal spores associated with their dung declined rapidly with the arrival of humans, and butchery marks have been found on giant subfossil lemur remains, hunting appears to be a plausible explanation for the initial decline of the megafauna.

By region, studies have revealed specific details that have helped outline the series of events that led to the extinction of the local megafauna. In the Central Highlands, dense forests existed until 1600 CE, with lingering patches persisting until the 19th and 20th centuries. Today, small fragments stand isolated among vast expanses of human-created savanna, despite an average annual rainfall that is sufficient to sustain the evergreen forests once found there. Deliberately set fires were the cause of the deforestation, and forest regrowth is restricted by soil erosion and the presence of fire-resistant, exotic grasses. In the southeast, an extended drought dating to 950 cal yr BP led to fires and transition of open grasslands. The drought may also have pushed humans populations to rely more heavily on bushmeat. Had humans not been present, the subfossil lemur populations might have adjusted to the new conditions and recovered. Had the drought not reduced the population of the subfossil lemurs, the pressure from the small number of people living in the region at the time might not have been enough to cause the extinctions. All of the factors that have played a role in past extinctions are still present and active today. As a result, the extinction event that claimed Madagascar's giant subfossil lemurs is still ongoing.

=== Lingering populations and oral tradition ===
Recent radiocarbon dates from accelerator mass spectrometry ^{14}C dating, such as 630 ± 50 BP for Megaladapis remains and 510 ± 80 BP for Palaeopropithecus remains, indicate that the giant lemurs survived into modern times. It is likely that memories of these creatures persist in the oral traditions of some Malagasy cultural groups. Some recent stories from around Belo sur Mer in southwestern Madagascar might even suggest that some of the giant subfossil lemurs still survive in remote forests.

Flacourt's 1658 description of the tretretretre or tratratratra was the first mention of the now extinct giant lemurs in Western culture, but it is unclear if he saw it. The creature Flacourt described has traditionally been interpreted as a species of Megaladapis. The size may have been exaggerated, and the "round head and a human face" would not match Megaladapis, which had an enlarged snout and the least forward-facing eyes of all primates. The facial description, and the mention of a short tail, solitary habits, and other traits better match the most recent interpretation — Palaeopropithecus. Malagasy tales recorded by the 19th-century folklorist Gabriel Ferrand describing a large animal with a flat human-like face that was unable to negotiate smooth rock outcrops also best match Palaeopropithecus, which would also have had difficulty on flat smooth surfaces.

In 1995, a research team led by David Burney and Ramilisonina performed interviews in and around Belo sur Mer, including Ambararata and Antsira, to find subfossil megafaunal sites used early in the century by other paleontologists. During carefully controlled interviews, the team recorded stories of recent sightings of dwarf hippos (called kilopilopitsofy) and of a large lemur-like creature known as kidoky; a report of the interviews was published in 1998 with encouragement from primatologist Alison Jolly and anthropologist Laurie Godfrey. In one interview, an 85-year-old man named Jean Noelson Pascou recounted seeing the rare kidoky up close in 1952. Pascou said that the animal looks similar to a sifaka, but had a human-like face, and was "the size of a seven-year-old girl". It had dark fur and a discernible white spot both on the forehead and below the mouth. According to Pascou, it was a shy animal that fled on the ground instead of in the trees. Burney interpreted the old man as saying that it moved in "a series of leaps", but Godfrey later claimed that "a series of bounds" was a better translation — a description that would closely match the foot anatomy of monkey lemurs, such as Hadropithecus and Archaeolemur. Pascou could also imitate its call, a long single "whoop", and said that kidoky would come closer and continue calling if he imitated the call correctly. The call Pascou imitated was comparable to that of a short call for an indri, which lives on the other side of Madagascar. When shown a picture of an indri, Pascou said kidoky did not look like that, and that it had a rounder face, more similar to a sifaka. Pascou also speculated that kidoky could stand on two legs and that it was a solitary animal.

Another interviewee, François, a middle-aged woodcutter who spent time in the forests inland (east) from the main road between Morondava and Belo sur Mer, and five of his friends, reported seeing kidoky recently. Their description of the animal and François's imitation of its long call were virtually identical to Pascou's. One of the young men insisted that its fur had a lot of white in it, but the other men could not confirm that. François and his friends reported that it had never climbed a tree in their presence, and that it flees on the ground in short leaps or bounds. When Burney imitated the sideways leaping of a sifaka moving on the ground, one of the men corrected him, pointing out that he was imitating a sifaka. The man's imitation of the gallop kidoky used was very baboon-like. The men also reported that imitating its call can draw the animal closer and cause it to continue calling.

Burney and Ramilisonina admitted that the most parsimonious explanation for the sightings was that kidoky was a misidentified sifaka or other larger living lemur species. The authors did not feel comfortable with such a dismissal because of their careful quizzing and use of unlabeled color plates during the interviews and because of the competence demonstrated by the interviewees in regards to local wildlife and lemur habits. The possibility of a wild introduced baboon surviving in the forests could not be dismissed. The descriptions of kidoky, with its terrestrial baboon-like gait, make Hadropithecus and Archaeolemur the most plausible candidates among the giant subfossil lemurs. At the very least, the stories support a wider extinction window for the giant subfossil lemurs, suggesting that their extinction was recent enough for such vivid stories to survive in the oral traditions of the Malagasy people.
