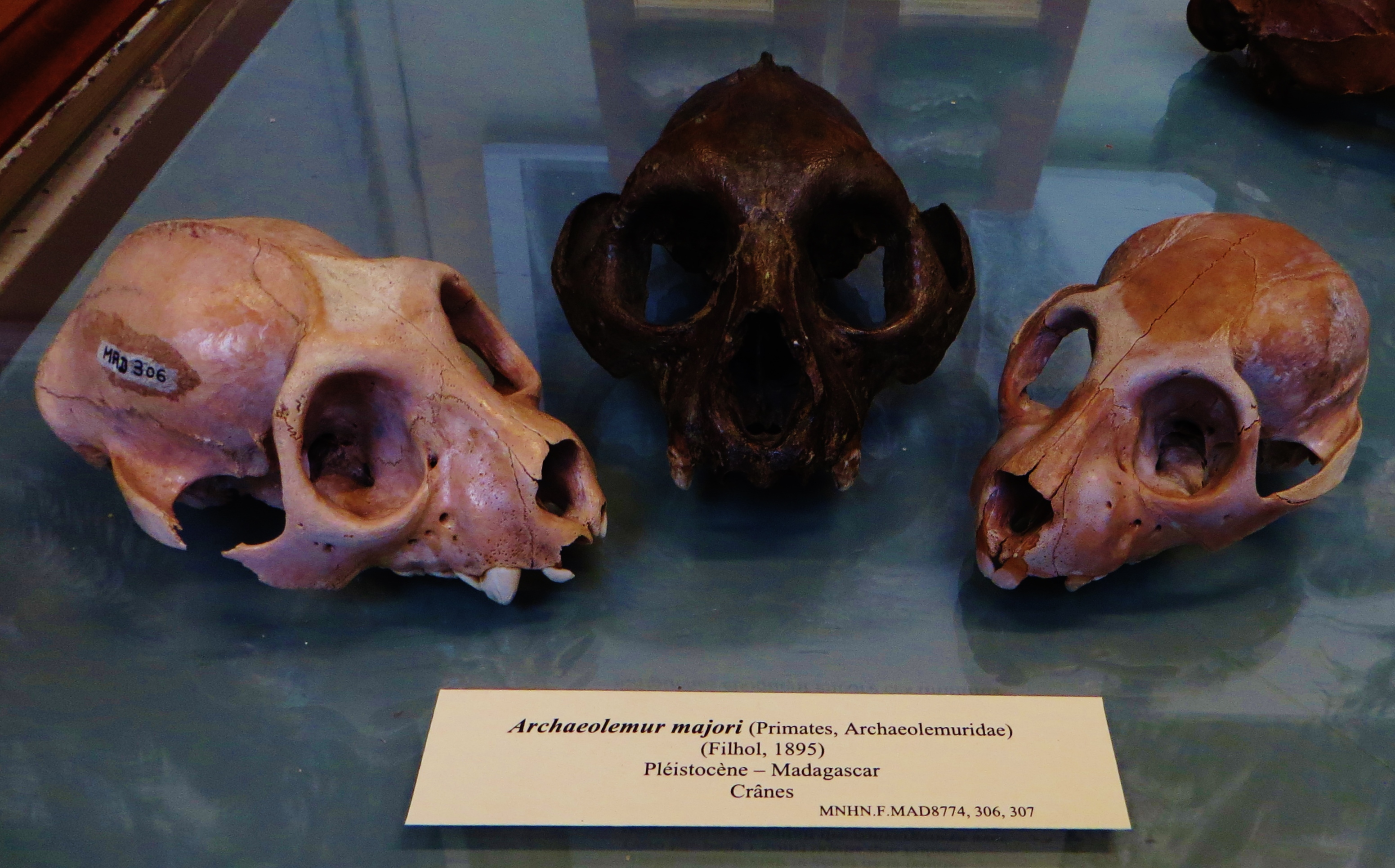
- Archaeolemur majori skulls

Conservation status
- Extinct (1047-1280)

Scientific classification
- Kingdom: Animalia
- Phylum: Chordata
- Class: Mammalia
- Order: Primates
- Suborder: Strepsirrhini
- Family: †Archaeolemuridae
- Genus: †Archaeolemur; Filhol, 1895

Type species
- Archaeolemur majori Filhol, 1895

Species
- †Archaeolemur edwardsi (Filhol, 1895); †Archaeolemur majori; Filhol, 1895

Synonyms
- Bradylemur G. Grandidier, 1899; Globilemur Forsyth Major, 1898; Nesopithecus Forsyth Major, 1896

= Archaeolemur =

Archaeolemur Temporal range: Late Pleistocene-Holocene

Extinct genus of lemurs

Archaeolemur is an extinct genus of subfossil lemurs known from the Quaternary of Madagascar. Archaeolemur is one of the most common and well-known of the extinct giant lemurs as hundreds of its bones have been discovered in fossil deposits across the island. It was larger than any extant lemur, with a body mass of approximately 18.2–26.5 kg (40–58 lb), and is commonly reconstructed as the most frugivorous and terrestrial of the fossil Malagasy primates. Colloquially known as a "monkey lemur," Archaeolemur has often been compared with anthropoids, specifically the cercopithecines, due to various morphological convergences. In fact, it was even misidentified as a monkey when remains were first discovered. Following human arrival to Madagascar just over 2000 years ago, many of the island’s megafauna went extinct, including the giant lemurs. Radiocarbon dating indicates that Archaeolemur survived on Madagascar until at least 1040-1290 AD, outliving most other subfossil lemurs.

== Taxonomy ==
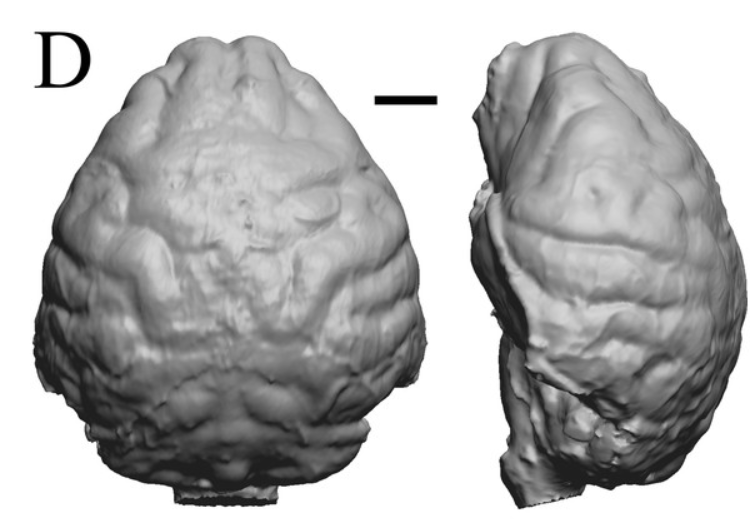
Digital endocast of the cranial cavity of Archaeolemur majori (AMNH FM 30007 = FMNH PM 59258).

The genus Archaeolemur comprises two known species: A. edwardsi and A. majori, with the former being larger and more robust than the latter. The genus belongs to the family Archaeolemuridae, which, aside from Archaeolemur, also includes the extinct species Hadropithecus stenognathus. Archaeolemuridae has historically been considered the sister group of the extinct family of subfossil lemurs, Paleopropithecidae (also known as the "sloth lemurs"), and the extant family, Indriidae, mainly due to similarities in the teeth and skull. This relationship has been contested by morphological analyses that instead grouped Archaeolemuridae more closely with Lemuridae. One such analysis looked at ontogenetic data for Archaeolemur in order to extrapolate phylogenetic affinities and found the genus had more similarities with lemurids than with indriids in terms of growth and development. Despite such challenges, the sequencing of ancient DNA recovered from A. edwardsi, A. majori, and Hadropithecus stenognathus fossil specimens in a 2008 study lent important support to the phylogenetic placement of Archaeolemuridae as a sister group to living Indriidae, refuting Lemuridae as Archaeolemur’s closest relative. The authors of that genetic study placed Archaeolemuridae, Paleopropithecidae, and Indriidae into the superfamily Indrioidea within the infraorder Lemuriformes, although the exact phylogenetic relationships between the three were still unclear. A further genetic study in 2015 refined the phylogeny of Indrioidea, supporting a sister taxa relationship between Archaeolemuridae and the clade containing Paleopropithecidae and Indriidae.

== Functional morphology ==
Archaeolemur has a lower dental formula of 1-1-3-3. Therefore, the tooth comb, a key feature of strepsirrhines, consists of four teeth rather than the characteristic six teeth of most taxa. This dental reduction is also observed in indriids and palaeopropithecids, suggesting this is a potential synapomorphy among these groups. Microwear analysis of the lower incisors shows no evidence that the tooth comb of Archaeolemur was used for grooming. Rather, the lower incisors are thought to have served a dietary function, such as the procurement and processing of food. The upper incisors are large and spatulate, the premolars form a cutting edge, with the anterior lower premolar adopting a caniniform shape, and the molars are bilophodont and low-crowned. This bilophodont molar morphology converges on that of cercopithecine molars. These features have frequently been attributed to a frugivorous diet.

The enamel of Archaeolemur teeth is very thick and highly decussated, which might have played a role in processing hard-objects. Archaeolemur also has a fused mandibular symphysis, an adaptation for resisting chewing stress. A biomechanical analysis of the jaw showed that Archaeolemur was well suited for breaking apart large food items and dental microwear analysis of A. edwardsi and A. majori molars shows pitting that indicates Archaeolemur processed harder foods, supporting a generalist diet. Furthermore, the most similar microwear pattern among modern primates is found in Cebus apella, a hard-object feeder. Stable isotope analysis of A. majori indicates Archaeolemur was a consumer of C3 plants and coprolites associated with Archaeolemur indicate an omnivorous diet that included fruit, seeds, and even small animals. Overall, the evidence suggests Archaeolemur had a generalist diet that mainly consisted of fruit, seeds, and hard-objects.

The postcranial skeletal morphology reveals important aspects of Archaeolemur’s lifestyle. As the name "monkey lemur" suggests, Archaeolemur has often been compared to the Old World monkeys due to convergences in morphological and locomotory features, such as limb proportions. While there are certainly similarities between the two, the convergences are sometimes overstated. A comprehensive analysis of the hands and feet of Archaeolemur shows that its limbs are relatively short for its body size, as are the hands and feet. The pollex and hallux are reduced, along with the other digits, and were likely not prehensile; nevertheless, the ability to grasp when climbing was probably retained. Archaeolemur has broad apical tufts on the distal phalanges of both the hands and feet, which some have suggested might be related to grooming in the absence of a functioning tooth comb. Unlike the Paleopropithecidae, or "sloth lemurs," who had highly curved proximal phalanges for suspensory behavior, the proximal phalanges of Archaeolemur are straighter than those of all extinct Malagasy primates, although still more curved than those of baboons. This morphological data, along with a previous study of the pelvis and scapula, support the conclusion that Archaeolemur’s locomotory habits most likely consisted of both terrestrial and arboreal quadrupedalism. It was probably neither cursorial, nor a leaper.

== Geographic range ==
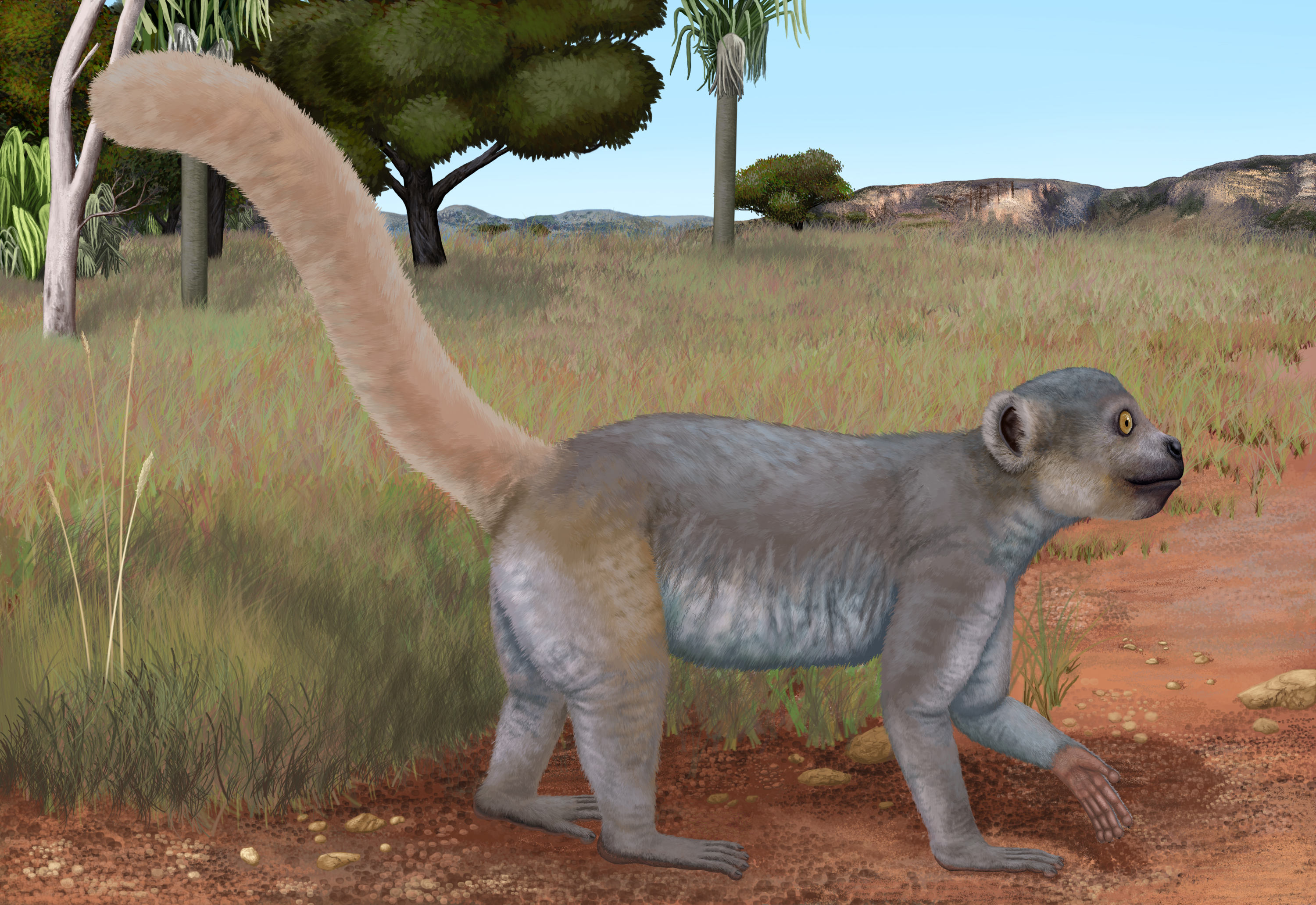
Life restoration of Archaeolemur edwardsi

In order to reconstruct the geographic home range of Archaeolemur, a study was conducted analyzing strontium isotope ratios from bone and tooth enamel of extinct and extant lemurs. The authors found no significant difference in the median isotope variance when comparing values between extinct and living taxa. This suggests that despite larger body size, which typically predicts more mobility and more variable strontium isotope ratios, subfossil lemurs were likely not very active and did not have larger home ranges than living species. Despite this relatively small home range for body size, Archaeolemur as a genus is believed to have been distributed across Madagascar and to have had a broad habitat tolerance.

== Extinction ==
While it is difficult to pinpoint one specific factor that drove Archaeolemur to extinction, many authors agree that human activity upon arriving to Madagascar directly and indirectly impacted the island’s unique flora and fauna. Human hunting likely played a primary role in the megafaunal extinctions, and would have had cascading effects on the structure of animal and plant communities. The modification of landscapes, including habitat fragmentation and habitat loss, would have added additional pressure on taxa like the giant lemurs, further driving them toward extinction. Like modern species with low mobility and small home ranges, these characteristics might have made Archaeolemur and its other fossil relatives vulnerable to extinction. Large body size and frugivory are additional factors that might make organisms increasingly vulnerable when compared to smaller animals or folivores facing habitat fragmentation or degradation. Likewise, the terrestrial habit of Archaeolemur might have made it susceptible to human hunting. Given Archaeolemur’s larger body size compared to modern lemurs, its interpreted small home range, and its likely frugivorous diet, this genus may have been especially vulnerable to extinction when facing habitat change and human intervention on Madagascar. Nevertheless, Archaeolemur inhabited Madagascar until at least 1040-1290 AD, surviving longer than most other subfossil lemurs.

== Classification ==
- Order Primates
  - Suborder Strepsirrhini: lemurs, galagos, and lorisids
    - Infraorder Lemuriformes
      - Superfamily Lemuroidea
        - Family †Archaeolemuridae
          - Genus †Archaeolemur
            - Species †Archaeolemur edwardsi
            - Species †Archaeolemur majori
          - Genus †Hadropithecus
        - Family Cheirogaleidae: dwarf and mouse lemurs
        - Family Daubentoniidae: aye-aye
        - Family Indriidae: woolly lemurs and allies
        - Family Lemuridae: lemurs
        - Family Lepilemuridae: sportive lemurs
        - Family †Megaladapidae
        - Family †Palaeopropithecidae
      - Superfamily Lorisoidea: lorises, pottos, galagos and allies
  - Suborder Haplorrhini: tarsiers, monkeys and apes
