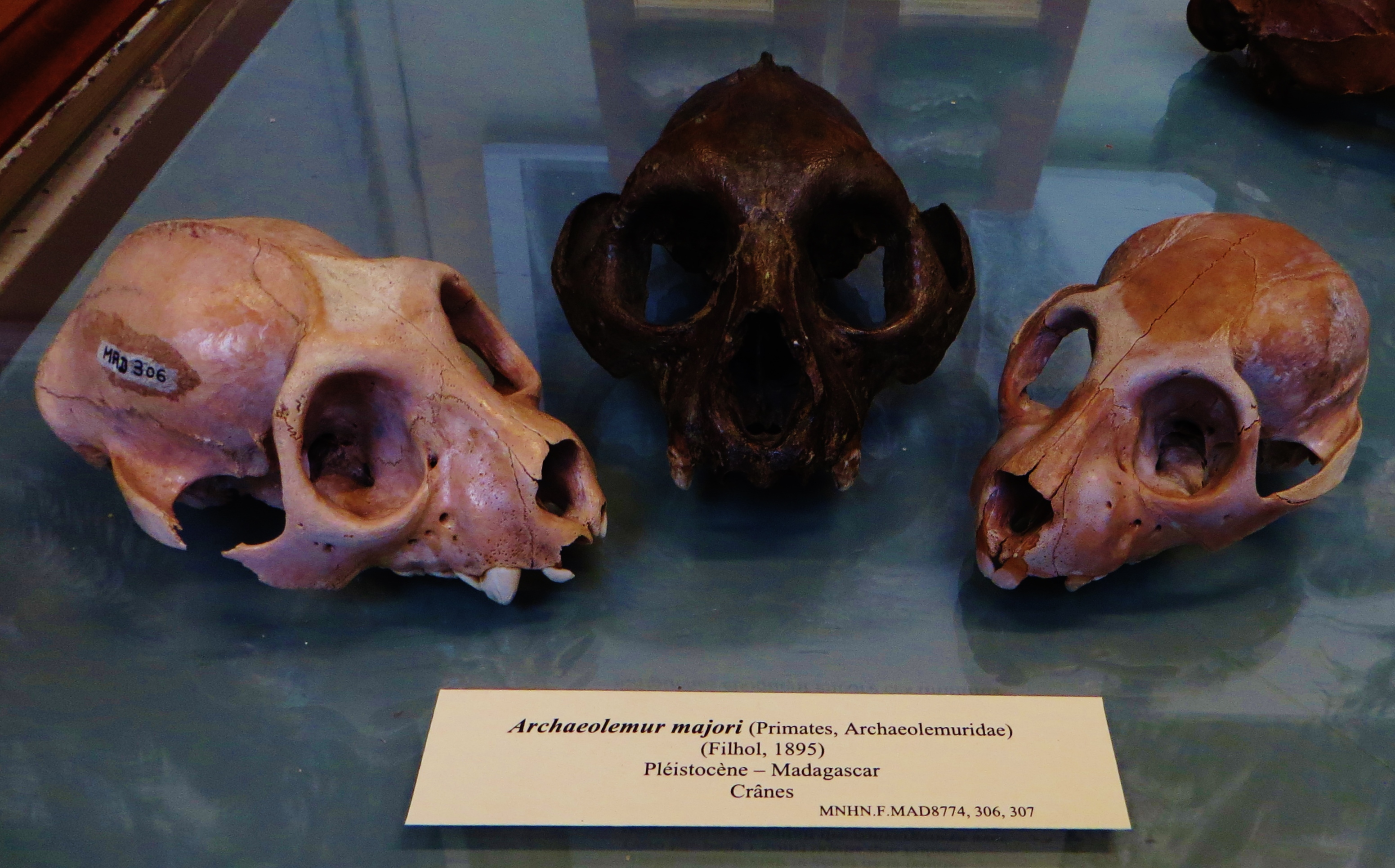
- Archaeolemur majori skulls

Scientific classification
- Kingdom: Animalia
- Phylum: Chordata
- Class: Mammalia
- Order: Primates
- Suborder: Strepsirrhini
- Superfamily: Lemuroidea
- Family: †Archaeolemuridae; G. Grandidier, 1905

Genera
- †Hadropithecus; †Archaeolemur

= Monkey lemur =

Monkey lemur Temporal range: Quaternary

Extinct family of lemurs

The monkey lemurs or baboon lemurs (Archaeolemuridae) are a recently extinct family of lemurs known from skeletal remains from sites on Madagascar dated to 1000 to 3000 years ago.

The monkey lemur family is divided into two genera, Hadropithecus and Archaeolemur, and three species.

== Description ==
Reconstructions indicate that these extinct lemurs did not climb very often and imply that they were much more adept at terrestrial living, more than any other extant strepsirrhine; they are not believed to have been exclusively terrestrial, but rather to have had a combined habitat of ground and arboreal life. A modest degree of curvature found in the remains support this idea.

The genus Archaeolemur consists of two known species, Archaeolemur edwardsi and Archaeolemur majori. The hands and feet are very robust and large in size, but are very short, and said to be closer to the likeness of a baboon's hand. The hind-limbs are also known to be short, which implies that the hands and feet are relatively short for the lemur's body weight. Archaeolemur is unique in the combination of post-cranial features. The overall look of the lemur was an animal with relatively short and stocky proportions which gave them limited leaping abilities. This indicates that Archaeolemur may have ranged over more open habitat, which is consistent with its subfossil distribution over much of Madagascar, implying that they tolerated a wide range of habitats. Archaeolemur are thought to be omnivores from the fossilized droppings of a younger individual. An imaging technique shows pictures of the mandibles, showing the bone structure of the mouth. Further studies on their enamel indicate that Archaeolemur also had the ability to exploit resources that may have been indigestible to other species, showing a great plasticity in their dietary tracts as well. This may have helped Archaeolemur persist after the arrival of humans in Madagascar, as it was one of the last subfossil lemurs to become extinct.

Archaeolemuridae placement within the lemur phylogeny

- Lemuriformes
  - Daubentoniidae
  - - - †Megaladapidae
      - Lemuridae
    - - - Cheirogaleidae
        - Lepilemuridae
      - - †Archaeolemuridae
          - †Archaeolemur
          - †Hadropithecus
        - - †Palaeopropithecidae
          - Indriidae

Hadropithecus stenognathus is the only species of the genus Hadropithecus, and is commonly referred to as the "baboon lemur". The species was discovered in Madagascar in the year 1899 by Ludwig Lorenz von Liburnau, who associated the monkey lemurs with apes. Three years later, in 1902, Liburnau classified Hadropithecus as a lemur. Liburnau continued to make distinctions by reconstruction of certain skulls which reaffirmed that the monkey lemurs are a sister family to sloth lemurs. In an article analyzing the dental microwear of the Archaeolemuridae, some important information was discovered through fossilized teeth. This in turn helped distinguish between certain characteristics of the monkey lemurs compared to megaladapids. The two families occasionally had similar diets, observed from the overlapping textures of their dental microwear. However, the two families’ dental microwear differed at some points, indicating that archaeolemurids had a diet containing a variety of harder foods. H. stenognathus possessed similar cranial stricture and dental portions to hominins. Carbon isotope data show that they consumed CAM or C4 plants. The prior assumption that H. stenognathus ate C3 plants which included large seeds and hard fruits were wrong because those foods were too strong for the animal's teeth. Testing the carbon samples along southern and southwestern Madagascar where H. stenognathus once lived and was endemic to, scientists found high values of carbon isotopes tied to the C4 and CAM groups of plants. The large teeth were meant to extract the nutrients from food that needed incisional, but not tough preparation. H. stenognathus was well-suited to processing large amounts of small and/or flat, displacement-limited foods, rather than a previously thought diet of resistant, stress-limited foods. The species lived in environments in southern and southwestern Madagascar, where it is thought to have consumed bulbs and corms of grasses and sedges comprising the bulk of its diet.

H. stenognathus may have survived until the late 1st Millennium CE. It was driven to extinction mainly by human activity, like many other lemurs of Madagascar. However, it became extinct sooner than Archaeolemur, its sister genus. The last known record of Hadropithecus was dated to around 444–772 CE. It is believed that Hadropithecus was a relatively rare lemur, based on a lower number of subfossils recorded. Similar to the sloth lemur, Hadropithecus was a large, slow, specialized lemur, that grazed and fed on seeds. Archaeolemur was more generalized, which may have allowed it to persist longer. Although it is not completely verified, Hadropithecus's large body and large brain, compared to other species, has led to the belief that it would have reproduced fairly slowly, making it more susceptible to extinction. The low reproductive rate goes hand in hand with weaning age - Hadropithecus would not have weaned its young before 2.75 years of age, or even 3 years, giving it one of the slowest life cycles of any lemur. It is believed that Hadropithecus would have not given birth more than once every other year. In addition, Hadropithecus would have spent most, if not all, of its time on the ground, making it readily available for hunting and exploitation by humans. It not only would have faced pressure from humans, but also from domestic livestock, which were grazers as well. Though it could have climbed trees, it lacked adaptation for suspension or leaping.
