= Giant aye-aye =

Giant aye-aye Temporal range: Holocene

Conservation status
- Extinct

Scientific classification
- Kingdom: Animalia
- Phylum: Chordata
- Class: Mammalia
- Infraclass: Placentalia
- Order: Primates
- Suborder: Strepsirrhini
- Family: Daubentoniidae
- Genus: Daubentonia
- Species: †D. robusta

Binomial name
- †Daubentonia robusta Lamberton, 1935

Extinct species of lemur

The giant aye-aye (Daubentonia robusta) is an extinct species of lemurs that is the only known relative of the extant aye-aye. Together, they are the only known species in the genus Daubentonia. Like all lemurs, it is endemic to the island of Madagascar. It is believed to have gone extinct less than 1,000 years ago. It is only known from its subfossil remains.

As of 2004, giant aye-aye remains consisted of four incisors, a tibia, and other postcranial material, though no skull of D. robusta has been found. Subfossil remains of this species have been found in the southern and southeastern portion of Madagascar, outside the range of extant aye-aye. This suggests that the two species diverge through allopatric speciation. Some incisors have been found with holes drilled in them that suggest they have been modified by humans, further implying that anthropogenic factors may have played a role in this species' extinction.

D. robusta is morphologically similar to the aye-aye, but has more robust limbs and differing limb proportions (notably a higher humerofemoral index and relatively shorter limbs compared to its body mass). Its postcrania indicate D. robusta exhibited certain features also found in its living congener, such as a large brachialis flange, allowing for a relatively massive brachioradialis muscle. While the giant aye-aye's forelimbs were much stronger than its hindlimbs, the femoral anatomy of D. robusta suggests that it may have been capable of some amount of leaping. Based on mandible, incisor, and limb measurements, D. robusta is believed to be 2.5 to 5 times larger than the extant aye-aye.

D. robusta shares multiple highly specialized appendicular and manual adaptations with its living congener, such as an elongated and thin digit III. D. robusta likely filled a similar ecological niche as the extant aye-aye, which consists of manually tap-foraging and gouging insects and insect larvae out of tree bark.
