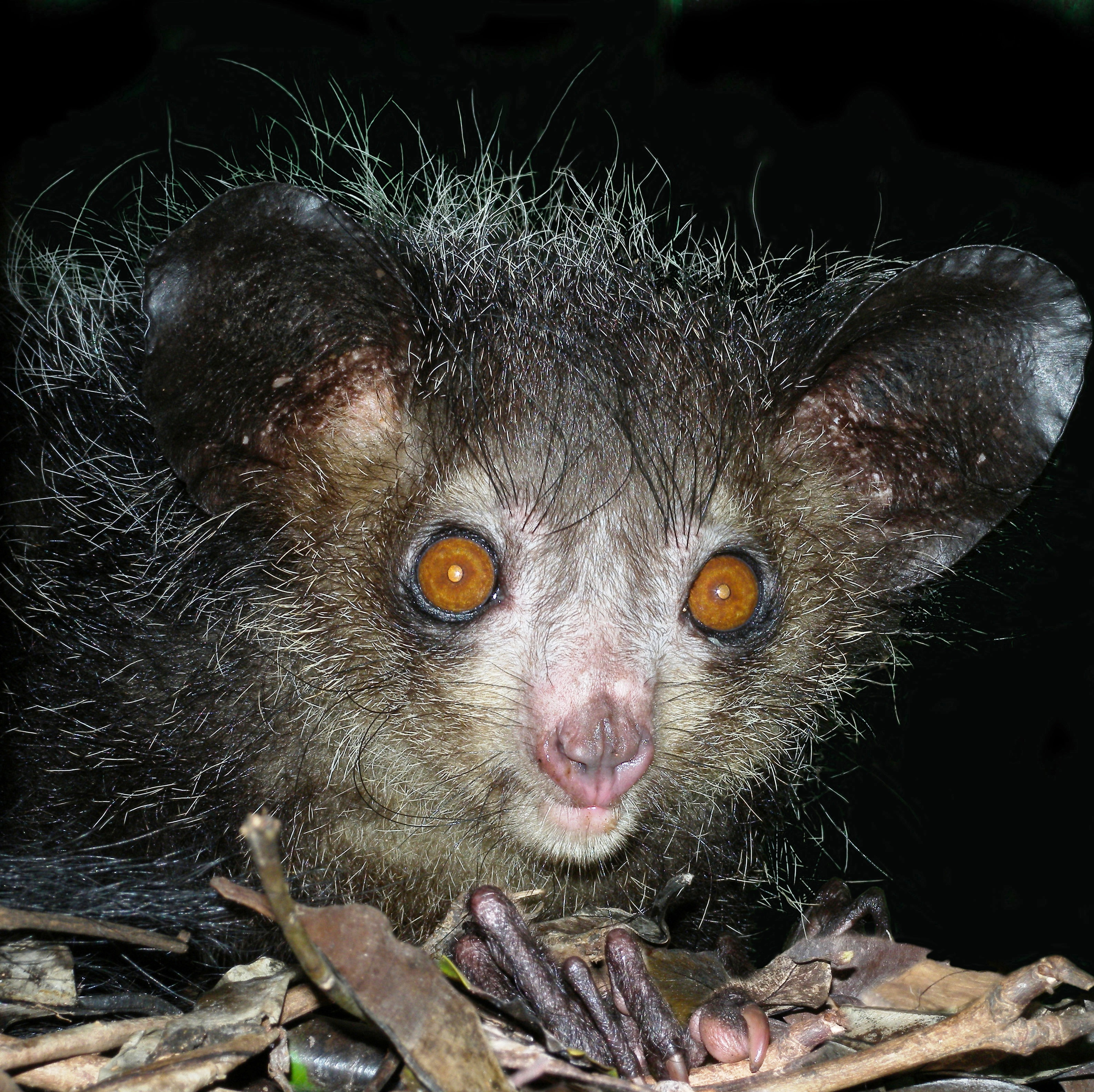
- Aye-aye (Daubentonia madagascariensis)

Scientific classification
- Domain: Eukaryota
- Kingdom: Animalia
- Phylum: Chordata
- Class: Mammalia
- Order: Primates
- Suborder: Strepsirrhini
- Superfamily: Lemuroidea
- Family: Daubentoniidae; Gray, 1863
- Genus: Daubentonia; É. Geoffroy, 1795

Species
- Daubentonia madagascariensis †Daubentonia robusta

Synonyms
- Family: Cheiromyidae I. Geoffroy St. Hilaire, 1851; Chiromyidae Bonaparte, 1850; Genus: Aye-aye Lacépède, 1799; Cheiromys G. Cuvier, 1817; Cheyromys É. Geoffroy, 1803; Chiromys Illiger, 1811; Myslemur Anon. [?de Blainville], 1846; Myspithecus de Blainville, 1839; Psilodactylus Oken, 1816; Scolecophagus É. Geoffroy, 1795

= Daubentonia =

Genus of mammals

Daubentonia is the sole genus of the Daubentoniidae, a family of lemuroid primate native to much of Madagascar.

The aye-aye (Daubentonia madagascariensis) is the only extant member. However, a second species known as the giant aye-aye (Daubentonia robusta) lived until recently, becoming extinct within the last 1000 years.
