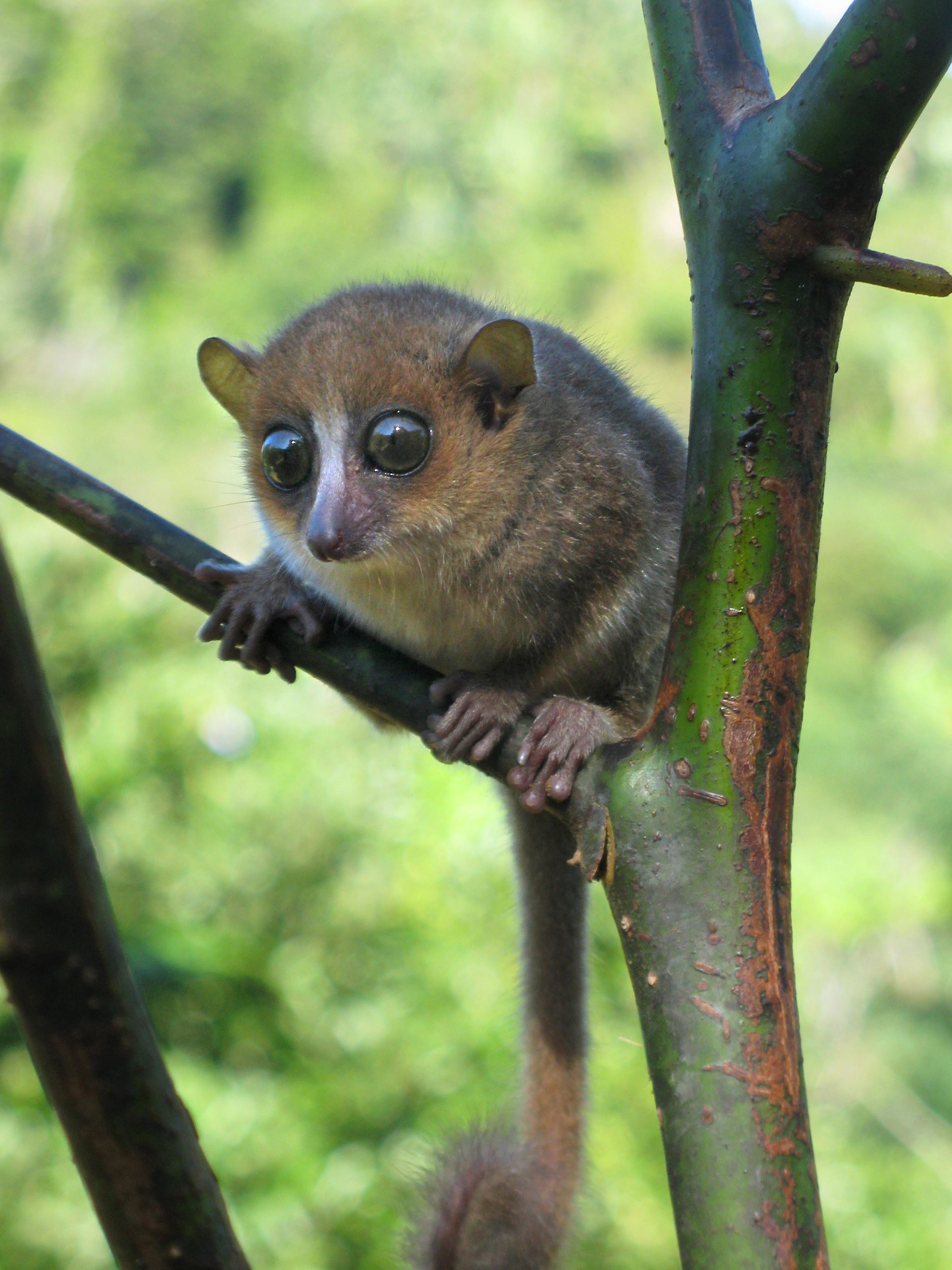

Conservation status
- Critically Endangered (IUCN 3.1)
- CITES Appendix I

Scientific classification
- Kingdom: Animalia
- Phylum: Chordata
- Class: Mammalia
- Order: Primates
- Suborder: Strepsirrhini
- Family: Cheirogaleidae
- Genus: Microcebus
- Species: M. gerpi

Binomial name
- Microcebus gerpi Radespiel et al., 2012
- Distribution of M. gerpi

= Gerp's mouse lemur =

Species of lemur

Gerp's mouse lemur (Microcebus gerpi) is a species of mouse lemur known only from the Sahafina Forest in eastern Madagascar, near Mantadia National Park. Its discovery was announced in 2012 by a German and Malagasy research team. The Sahafina Forest had not been studied until 2008 and 2009, when Groupe d'Étude et de Recherche sur les Primates de Madagascar (GERP)—a Malagasy-based research and conservation group for which the lemur is named—inventoried the forest's lemurs.

Based on genetic studies, measurements, and photos, the research team confirmed the Gerp's mouse lemur was an undescribed species, distinct from Goodman's mouse lemur, which is found 58-kilometre (36 mi) away. Gerp's mouse lemur is significantly larger, weighing on average 68-gram (2.4 oz), compared to Goodman's mouse lemur, which weighs about 44 g (1.6 oz). Jolly's mouse lemur, which is its closest relative and a neighbor to the south, is comparably larger, but differs in tail length and genetics.

Because it is a recently discovered species, little is known about its behavior, communication, ecology, or reproduction. The species appears to be restricted to a small region of lowland evergreen rain forest, and is seriously threatened by forest loss.

== Evolutionary and taxonomic history ==
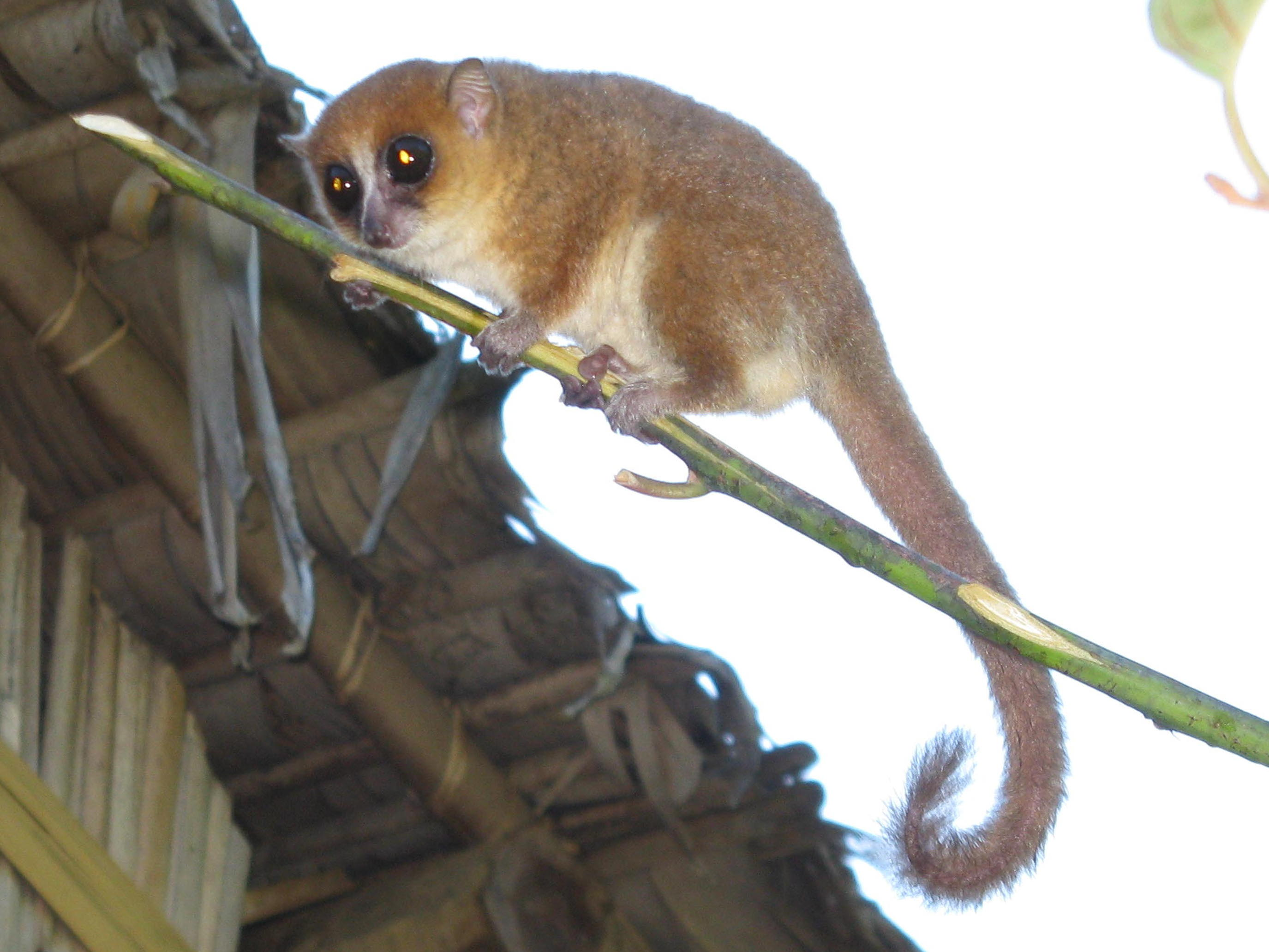
The first recorded specimen (shown here) was captured, recorded, and released on 25 June 2009.

Gerp's mouse lemur was discovered by German and Malagasy members of the Malagasy organization Groupe d'Étude et de Recherche sur les Primates de Madagascar (GERP) in a previously unstudied lowland forest known as the Sahafina Forest in eastern Madagascar, near Mantadia National Park. The first recorded specimen (holotype) of the species was captured on 25 June 2009, and was released after genetic samples, measurements, and photographs were taken. At the time, it was not recognized as a distinct species of mouse lemur. Two other paratypes were also measured and recorded, but no physical specimen was obtained by the publication of the initial study.

The discovery was published in the journal Primates in 2012. The species was named after the research and conservation team that described it. Gerp's mouse lemur differed genetically and physically from all of its nearest neighboring mouse lemur species. Its tail is longer than its closest relative, Jolly's mouse lemur (M. jollyae), which lives further south and whose tail is 18% shorter. It also has a higher body mass (68 g (2.4 oz)) and is generally larger than Goodman's mouse lemur (M. lehilahytsara), which weighs about 44 g (1.6 oz). Gerp's mouse lemur exhibits significant genetic differences from its northern neighbor, Simmons' mouse lemur (M. simmonsi).

The genetics tests initially conducted focused on three different loci of mitochondrial DNA: a partial D-loop region, MT-CYB, and COII. D-loop analysis suggested Jolly's mouse lemur was Gerp's mouse lemur's closest relative (forming a sister group). All three tests showed the mouse lemurs sampled from Sahafina formed a monophyletic clade (an exclusive family group) and the species was sufficiently distinct from other mouse lemurs. The authors concluded both the molecular and morphological differences supported the declaration of a new species based on the phylogenetic species concept and a more conservative "integrative taxonomic approach".

== Anatomy and physiology ==
Among mouse lemurs, Gerp's mouse lemur is larger-bodied and has a long tail, which can be used to store fat. The fur is darker on its back, which is brownish-gray with a broad reddish line down the middle, compared to the front, which varies from a light gray to creamy white and extends from the throat to the genitals. The outer arms and legs contrast the rest of the body with their darker color, and the fingers have sparse, whitish-gray fur. The head is reddish in color, with darker brown surrounding the eyes and a noticeable white stripe across the nose and between the eyes. Its ears are prominent, yet small, with dark brown edges. The tail is covered in dense, long, brownish-gray fur. The undercoat is short and dense, while the guard hairs are sparser. The skin visible on the hands and feet is colored pinkish-brown.

Gerp's mouse lemur weighs around 68 g (2.4 oz) and has a tail length of approximately 146.5 mm (5.77 in). It is a large-bodied mouse lemur, and belongs to a group of large mouse lemurs (weighing more than 50 grams (1.8 oz)), including four eastern species—Simmons' mouse lemur, Jolly's mouse lemur, the northern rufous mouse lemur (M. tavaratra), and MacArthur's mouse lemur (M. macarthurii)—as well as six species of western mouse lemur: Claire's mouse lemur (M. mamiratra), Danfoss' mouse lemur (M. danfossi), the Bongolava mouse lemur (M. bongolavensis), the golden-brown mouse lemur (M. ravelobensis), the gray mouse lemur (M. murinus), and the reddish-gray mouse lemur (M. griseorufus). Most of these larger mouse lemur species have a long tail, as does Gerp's mouse lemur, with the exception of Jolly's mouse lemur and the gray mouse lemur. Its ears are small (measuring 19 to 20 mm (0.75 to 0.79 in)), which conforms with that of other rainforest mouse lemur species, in contrast to larger-eared mouse lemurs of the dry, western forests (averaging 21 to 24 mm (0.83 to 0.94 in)). As with all mouse lemurs, no body mass differences could be discerned between the sexes. However, larger samples are needed to confirm this.

== Behavior ==
No data are available concerning the behavior, communication, ecology, or reproduction of the Gerp's mouse lemur, although such data may help support its species status.

== Distribution and habitat ==
Gerp's mouse lemur has only been identified in the Sahafina Forest in eastern Madagascar, about 58 km (36 mi) east of Mantadia National Park, 87 km (54 mi) south of the city of Toamasina, and 18 km (11 mi) from the Indian Ocean. The forest fragment is about 15.6 km^{2} (6.0 sq mi) and is surrounded by secondary forest growing in areas previously cut for rice cultivation (known locally as savoka).

The Sahafina Forest ranges from 29 to 230 m (95 to 755 ft) above sea level, whereas nearby Mantadia National Park, home of its closest neighboring mouse lemur population (Goodman's mouse lemur), ranges from 900 to 1,200 m (3,000 to 3,900 ft) above sea level. No major rivers separate these highland and lowland forests and their respective mouse lemur populations. The initial study did not conclude whether the large Rianila River or one of the smaller rivers—the Ivonoro and Onibe—further north acts as a species boundary between Gerp's mouse lemur and Simmons' mouse lemur (M. simmonsi) to the north. Approximately 160 km (99 mi) the south lies the Mangoro River, a very large river that acts as a biogeographic barrier for many species. In 2010, a genetically distinct form of mouse lemur was sequenced from Marolambo, 25 km (16 mi) south of the river. The geographic range of Gerp's mouse lemur is unlikely to extend south of this river, but more studies are needed to confirm this. In total, the area between the rivers to the north and south, the highlands to the west, and the ocean to the east is no larger than 7,600 km^{2} (2,900 sq mi) (smaller than the island of Puerto Rico) and this is the likely extent of its geographic range.

== Conservation status ==
There are no protected areas within the known geographic range of Gerp's mouse lemur. Because it lives in lowland forests, which are more likely to be converted into agricultural land relative to highland rainforests, it faces an elevated conservation risk. Of the 7,600 km^{2} (2,900 sq mi) of its potential geographic range, only very small parts remain forested.

== See also ==
Other species with acronym names:

- AEECL's sportive lemur
- Apterichtus ansp
- Klossiella quimrensis
- Turbonilla musorstom
