= Nosy Boraha mouse lemur =

Conservation status
- Data Deficient (IUCN 3.1)

Scientific classification
- Kingdom: Animalia
- Phylum: Chordata
- Class: Mammalia
- Infraclass: Placentalia
- Order: Primates
- Suborder: Strepsirrhini
- Family: Cheirogaleidae
- Genus: Microcebus
- Species: M. boraha

Binomial name
- Microcebus boraha Hotaling et al., 2016

Species of lemur

The Nosy Boraha mouse lemur (Microcebus boraha) is a species of mouse lemur described in 2016 from Madagascar. It was discovered by a team of researchers at the German Primate Center. It was initially discovered among closely related species such as Madame Berthe's mouse lemur (already described in 2013), Bemanasy mouse lemur, and Ganzhorn's mouse lemur. Morphological similarity made it impossible to identify them as distinct species. A genetic study was done in collaboration with scientists at the University of Kentucky, the Duke Lemur Center and the University of Antananarivo in Madagascar. The mtDNA sequencing revealed that the species was unique.

The species is named after its natural habitat Malagasy Nosy Boraha on the Island of Sainte Marie.
