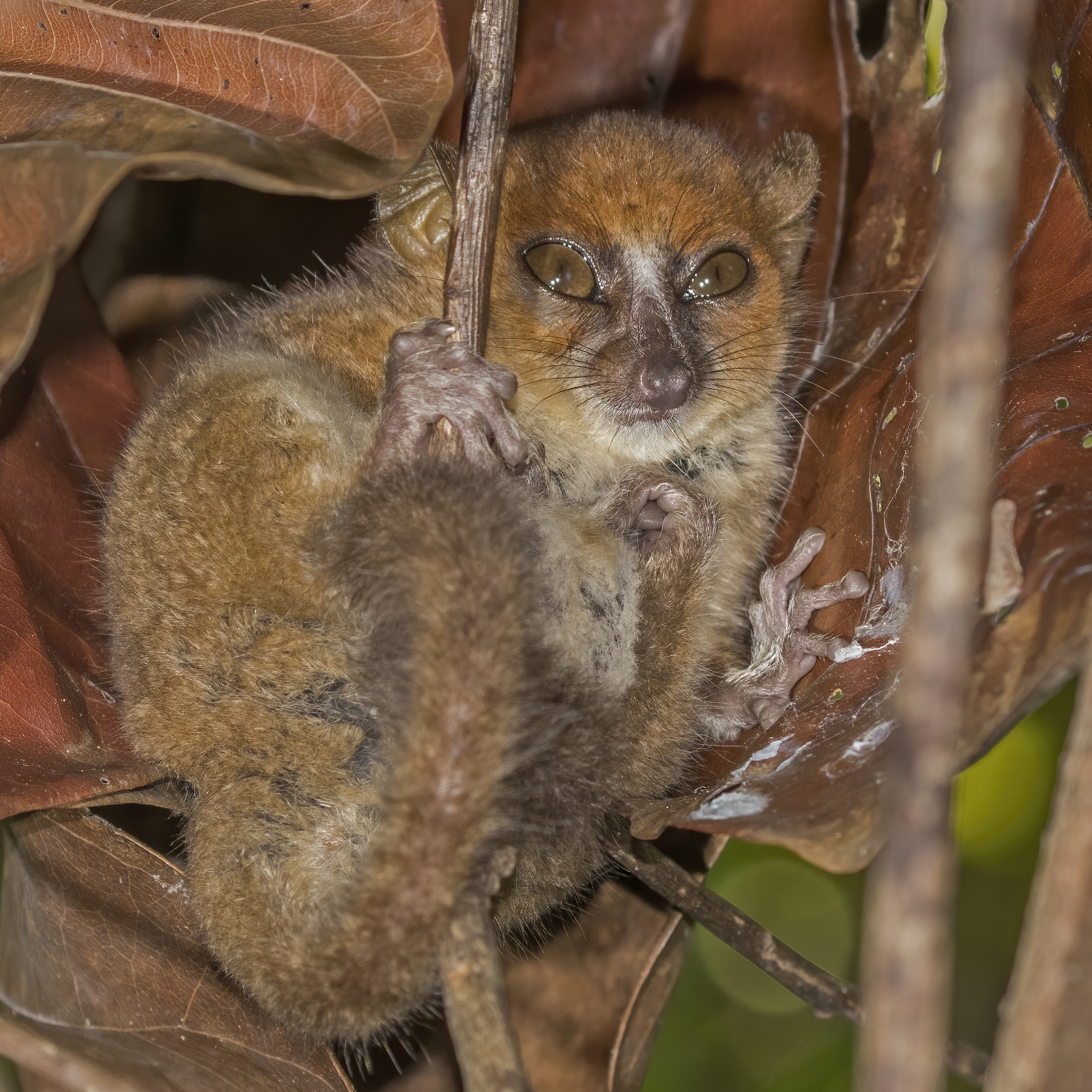
- in Lokobe Strict Reserve, Nosy Be

Conservation status
- Critically Endangered (IUCN 3.1)

Scientific classification
- Kingdom: Animalia
- Phylum: Chordata
- Class: Mammalia
- Order: Primates
- Suborder: Strepsirrhini
- Family: Cheirogaleidae
- Genus: Microcebus
- Species: M. manitatra

Binomial name
- Microcebus manitatra Hotaling et al., 2016

= Bemanasy mouse lemur =

Species of lemur

The Bemanasy mouse lemur, Microcebus manitatra, is a species of mouse lemur described in 2016 from Madagascar. It was discovered by a team of researchers at the German Primate Center. It was initially discovered among closely related species such as Madame Berthe's mouse lemur (already described in 2013), Boraha mouse lemur, and Ganzhorn's mouse lemur. Morphological similarity made it impossible to identify them as distinct species. A genetic study was done in collaboration with scientists at the University of Kentucky, the Duke Lemur Center and the University of Antananarivo in Madagascar. The mtDNA sequencing revealed that the species was unique.
