= Mittermeier's mouse lemur =

Conservation status
- Endangered (IUCN 3.1)
- CITES Appendix I

Scientific classification
- Kingdom: Animalia
- Phylum: Chordata
- Class: Mammalia
- Order: Primates
- Suborder: Strepsirrhini
- Family: Cheirogaleidae
- Genus: Microcebus
- Species: M. mittermeieri

Binomial name
- Microcebus mittermeieri Louis et al., 2006
- Distribution of M. mittermeieri

Species of lemur

Mittermeier's mouse lemur (Microcebus mittermeieri) is a species of mouse lemur known only from Anjanaharibe-Sud Special Reserve in Madagascar.

Mittermeier's mouse lemur is one of the smallest mouse lemurs, but is larger than Madame Berthe's mouse lemur, the smallest member of not only cheirogaleid family, but of all primates. According to Schwitzer et al., length of head and body is about 8 cm and the tail reaches about 12 cm. The weight is about 46 g. On the face, between the eyes, white spot can be observed, it is present in every Microcebus species. An area under it is yellow, which color reaches to ventral part of neck. Rest of the head is red-bronze to rusty, the same as the dorsum, contrary to the ventral part of the truncus, which is whitish brown. The tail is brown on dorsal part and has penultimate darker band and black tip. The basal parts of anterior and posterior extremities are orange.

The finding was announced June 21, 2006 at the Conservation International Global Symposium in Antananarivo, Madagascar, along with the discovery of Jolly's mouse lemur Microcebus jollyae and Simmons' mouse lemur Microcebus simmonsi as separate species. These new species were also officially announced in a paper in the International Journal of Primatology. The type locality is Madagascar, province Antsiranana, Special Reserve Anjaranahibe-Sud, reaching on northwest to Bealalana. Coordinates are 49° 28' E, 14° 48' S. This place is located 1056 m above sea level. No subspecies are recognised.

Like all other cheirogaleids, the Mittermeier's mouse lemur is endemic to Madagascar. It dwells in the northeastern part of the island, reaching Special Reserve Anjaranahibe-Sud by one side and Bealalana on the other. Maximum height is 1760 m above sea level. It is a forest animal, living in lowland and montane rain forests. It is arboreal and nocturnal. Research performed in primary forest Antambato of 150 ha found population density of 2,2 lemur / ha. There is no specific information concerning life cycle. Diet was not researched precisely, but probably Mittermeier's mouse lemur feed on insects and fruits, and maybe other items also consumed by congeneric lemurs. Sympatric to MacArthur's mouse lemur in Anjaranahibe-Sud reserve.
