= Arnhold's mouse lemur =

Conservation status
- Vulnerable (IUCN 3.1)
- CITES Appendix I

Scientific classification
- Kingdom: Animalia
- Phylum: Chordata
- Class: Mammalia
- Infraclass: Placentalia
- Order: Primates
- Suborder: Strepsirrhini
- Family: Cheirogaleidae
- Genus: Microcebus
- Species: M. arnholdi

Binomial name
- Microcebus arnholdi Louis et al., (2008)
- Distribution of M. arnholdi

Species of lemur

Arnhold's mouse lemur or the Montagne d'Ambre mouse lemur (Microcebus arnholdi) is a species of mouse lemur endemic to Madagascar. Its holotype was first collected on 27 November 2005, and was first described in 2008. According to genetic tests, it is genetically distinct from its closest sister taxa, the Sambirano mouse lemur (M. sambiranensis).

It is a medium-sized mouse lemur, weighing approximately 49.7 grams (1.75 oz), with a body length of 8.1 cm (3.2 in) and a tail length of 12.9 cm (5.1 in). It is found in the montane rainforest of Montagne d'Ambre National Park and Montagne d'Ambre Special Reserve in northern Madagascar.

== Etymology ==
The name arnholdi was chosen in honor of Henry Arnhold of New York, whose focus on linking the well-being of people in developing countries to the protection of critically important biodiversity hotspots helped create Conservation International's Healthy Communities Initiative and Conservation Stewards' Program.

== Anatomy and physiology ==
Arnhold's mouse lemur weighs approximately 49.7 grams (1.75 oz), although like other mouse lemurs, its weight will fluctuate depending upon the season. The holotype for the species, collected on 27 November 2005, weighed 71.0 g (2.50 oz), a body length of 8.1 cm (3.2 in) and a tail length of 12.9 cm (5.1 in). Other measurements include head crown of 3.3 cm (1.3 in), muzzle length of 9.4 mm (0.37 in), ear length of 17.8 mm (0.70 in), and ear width of 10.1 mm (0.40 in).

The dorsal pelage is dark brown, red and gray, with a dark brown midline dorsal stripe running down the base of the tail. The tail has a dark brown tip. The ventral pelage is white to cream, with gray undertones. The head is red, with dark brown on the muzzle and around the eyes. There is also a white nose ridge that stops at the distal end of the muzzle.

== Distribution ==
Arnhold's mouse lemur is found in the montane rainforest of Montagne d'Ambre National Park and Montagne d'Ambre Special Reserve, northwest of the Irodo River in the Antsiranana Province of Madagascar.

The southern end of the Arnhold's mouse lemur's range is bordered by the range of the northern rufous mouse lemur (M. tavaratra), forming a significant species barrier between it and its genetically closest sister taxa, the Sambirano mouse lemur (M. sambiranensis), further to the southwest.
