= Margot Marsh's mouse lemur =

Conservation status
- Endangered (IUCN 3.1)
- CITES Appendix I

Scientific classification
- Kingdom: Animalia
- Phylum: Chordata
- Class: Mammalia
- Infraclass: Placentalia
- Order: Primates
- Suborder: Strepsirrhini
- Family: Cheirogaleidae
- Genus: Microcebus
- Species: M. margotmarshae

Binomial name
- Microcebus margotmarshae Andriantompohavana et al., 2006
- Distribution of M. margotmarshae

Species of lemur

Margot Marsh's mouse lemur or the Antafondro mouse lemur (Microcebus margotmarshae) is a species of mouse lemur endemic to Madagascar. Its holotype was first collected on 21 May 2006, proposed in 2006 by Andriantompohavana et al., and was formally described in 2008 by E. Lewis, Jr., et al. According to genetic tests, it is genetically distinct from its closest sister taxon, Claire's mouse lemur (M. mamiratra).

It is a small mouse lemur, weighing approximately 41 grams (1.4 oz), with a body length of 8.4 cm (3.3 in) and a tail length of 14 cm (5.5 in). It is found in Antafondro Classified Forest Special Reserve in northern Madagascar.

== Etymology ==
The name margotmarshae was chosen in honor of Margot Marsh, who made generous lifetime contributions to primate conservation initiatives in many different countries. Upon her death in 1995, the Margot Marsh Biodiversity Foundation was founded to continue supporting her efforts to help safeguard the future of threatened primates.

== Anatomy and physiology ==
Margot Marsh's mouse lemur weighs approximately 41 grams (1.4 oz), although like other mouse lemurs, its weight will fluctuate depending upon the season. The holotype for the species, collected on 21 May 2006, weighed 49.0 g (1.73 oz), had a body length of 8.4 cm (3.3 in) and a tail length of 14.3 cm (5.6 in). Other measurements for the individual include head crown of 3.2 cm (1.3 in), muzzle length of 9.5 mm (0.37 in), ear length of 15.4 mm (0.61 in), and ear width of 8.7 mm (0.34 in).

The dorsal and tail pelage is mostly reddish-orange with gray undertones. The ventral pelage is white to cream. The head is mostly bright reddish-orange, and its ears are small. The muzzle and the fur around the eyes are light brown, and there is a small, bright white spot on the nose ridge between the eyes.

== Distribution ==
Margot Marsh's mouse lemur is found in the Antafondro Classified Forest Special Reserve, south of the Andranomalaza River and north of the Maevarano River in the Antsiranana Province of Madagascar.

The northern end of Margot Marsh's mouse lemur's range is bordered by the range of the Sambirano mouse lemur (M. sambiranensis), forming a significant species barrier between it and its genetically closest sister taxon, Claire's mouse lemur (M. mamiratra), farther to the north.
