= Jonah Ratsimbazafy =

Primatologist

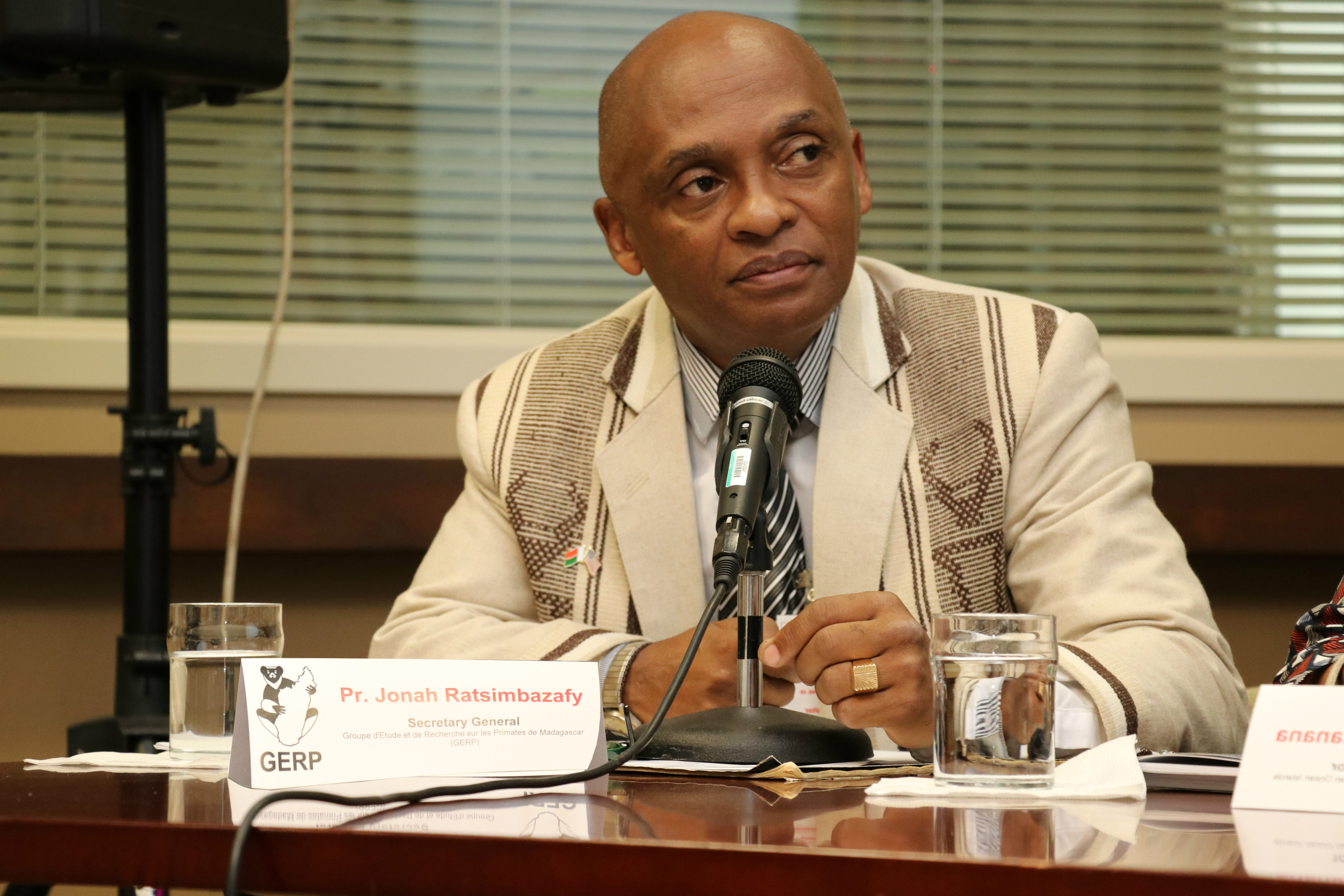
- Education: Stony Brook University
- Scientific career
- Fields: Primatology
- Thesis: On the brink of extinction and the process of recovery: Responses of black and white ruffed lemurs (Varecia variegata variegata) to disturbance in Manombo Forest

Jonah Ratsimbazafy is a Malagasy primatologist. In 2020, he was appointed President of the International Primatological Society.

== Life and research ==
Ratsimbazafy received his PhD from the State University of New York at Stony Brook in Physical Anthropology in 2002, and afterwards became Training and Conservation Coordinator for Durrell Wildlife Conservation Trust in Madagascar. He has published over 170 papers and supervised over 65 students, including 20 PhD students. His main field of study is lemur ecology and conservation.

Ratsimbazafy is Co-founder and President of the Madagascar Primate Study and Research Group (GERP), Houston Zoo's Director of Madagascar Programs, and Regional Vice-Chair of the IUCN SSC Primate Specialist Group for Madagascar. He is also one of the advisors of the Lemur Conservation Network and sits on the administrative board of SADABE, an NGO. In 2020, Ratsimbazafy was elected President of the International Primatological Society for a four-year term.

== Honours and awards ==
In 2015, Ratsimbazafy was awarded Disney's Conservation Hero Award. In 2017, Ratsimbazafy was elected as a member of the African Academy of Sciences. In 2023, he was the recipient of the Seacology Prize, which is awarded annually to individuals with significant achievements in preserving island ecosystems, species, or cultures.

In 2020, a new species of mouse lemur, Microcebus jonahi, was named in honour of Jonah Ratsimbazafy.
