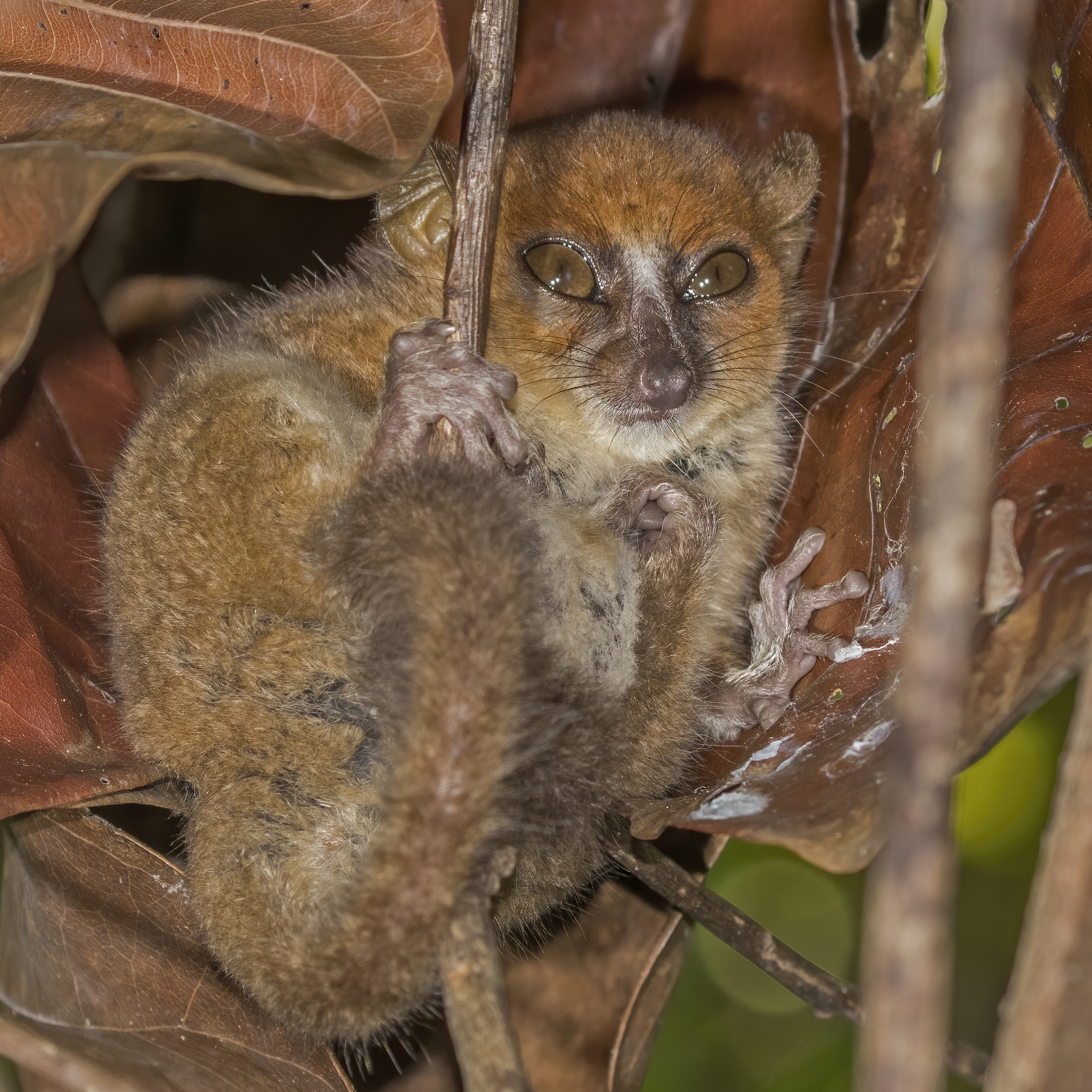
- in Lokobe Strict Reserve, Nosy Be

Conservation status
- Endangered (IUCN 3.1)
- CITES Appendix I

Scientific classification
- Kingdom: Animalia
- Phylum: Chordata
- Class: Mammalia
- Infraclass: Placentalia
- Order: Primates
- Suborder: Strepsirrhini
- Family: Cheirogaleidae
- Genus: Microcebus
- Species: M. mamiratra

Binomial name
- Microcebus mamiratra Andriantompohavana et al., 2006
- Distribution of M. mamiratra

Synonyms
- lokobensis Olivieri et al., 2007

= Claire's mouse lemur =

Species of lemur

Claire's mouse lemur (Microcebus mamiratra), or the Nosy Be mouse lemur, is a newly described species of lemur from the genus of the mouse lemurs (Microcebus). It lives on the island Nosy Bé in the Antsiranana province of Madagascar, and on the mainland near the village of Manehoka, including Lokobe Reserve. The scientific type name, mamiratra, comes from Malagasy and means "clear and bright"; this refers the Theodore F. and Claire M. Hubbard Family Foundation, which has contributed to genetic research on Madagascar. This species is closely related to another new species, "M. species nova # 5"; which is related to the Sambirano mouse lemur, Microcebus sambiranensis, and the northern rufous mouse lemur, Microcebus tavaratra.

This lemur is, with a weight of 60 g, average for its genus. The fur of the upper part is reddish-brown and becomes darker in the middle of the back. The tail is also reddish-brown, but the underbelly is white or creamy. It has a total length of 26 to 28 centimeters, including 15 to 17 centimeters of tail.

The species status of Claire's mouse lemur has been recently challenged by a broad study of nuclear DNA and gene trees in mouse lemurs. Results showed that although the mitochondrial DNA differed from that of the Sambirano mouse lemur, its nuclear DNA did not. This is likely due to female philopatry. Since females stay close to the home range in which they were born, mitochondrial DNA, which is inherited from the mother, is likely to remain similar within a small area while nuclear DNA within a species is likely to be similar over a much larger area. According to the study, this is the case for Claire's mouse lemur. For this reason, it was suggested that Claire's mouse lemur no longer be recognized as a distinct species.
