= Bongolava mouse lemur =

Conservation status
- Endangered (IUCN 3.1)
- CITES Appendix I

Scientific classification
- Kingdom: Animalia
- Phylum: Chordata
- Class: Mammalia
- Infraclass: Placentalia
- Order: Primates
- Suborder: Strepsirrhini
- Family: Cheirogaleidae
- Genus: Microcebus
- Species: M. bongolavensis

Binomial name
- Microcebus bongolavensis Olivieri et al., 2007
- Distribution of M. bongolavensis

Species of lemur

The Bongolava mouse lemur (Microcebus bongolavensis) is a species of mouse lemur endemic to Madagascar. It lives in western deciduous forest within a limited range, including Bongolava Forest and Ambodimahabibo Forest between the Sofia River and the Mahajamba River.

The Bongolava mouse lemur is one of the larger mouse lemurs. Its head and body measure 9–12.5 cm (3.5–4.9 in), and a tail measures 14.7–17.4 cm (5.8–6.9 in) and it weighs about 54 g (1.9 oz). In general appearance, the Bongolava mouse lemur looks like Danfoss' mouse lemur or the Golden-brown mouse lemur. The colour of the head can be differential, as ruddy bronze (especially in juveniles) ones were observed. Sometimes only a triangular area above eyes is brown or ruddy. The crown is pale gray. Between the eyes a characteristic white spot can be observed. The dorsum can be orange, maroon or red, sometimes there is an indistinct median darker line. The venter is cream white. The fur is dense but not long. The tail is longer than head and body, colored as the body, but distally it has longer and less dense fur. Its white hands and feet are covered by sparse fur too.

The species was described by Olivieri et al., 2007. The type locality is Madagascar, province Mahajanga, a fragment of forest near the village Ambodimahabibo near Port-Bergé. Geographical coordinates are 47° 28' E, 15° 30' S. Before the Bongolava mouse lemur was described, the author had thought that area had been dwelled by another congeneric species, a Golden-brown mouse lemur. The species is monotypic.

Data concerning behaviour or live cycle of the Bongolava Mouse Lemur are scarce. It is an arboreal and nocturnal animal. According to IUCN, a generation lasts 5 to 6 years.

Like all other cheirogaleids, the Bongolava mouse lemur is endemic to Madagascar. It occurs only in 3 forest patches in the north-western part of the island, between the rivers Mahajamba-Est and Sofia, near Port-Bergé. It can be present in the Bongolava Classified Forest. However, the area the species dwells is lesser than 1,100 km^{2} (420 sq mi). The habitat consists of primary dense mountain forest. Diet of the Bongolava mouse lemur was not researched with scrutiny. Is probably consumes insects and fruit, and maybe other items also consumed by congeneric lemurs.

IUCN classified the species first time in 2008 as Data Deficient. 6 years later its status was changed to Endangered, as it was rated in 2020 too. There is no estimation of the whole population, but it probably decreases. Genetic research showed a drastic decrease in genetic diversity of the species in the last few centuries, when the forests of Madagascar were destroyed by human. Species habitat is continually destroyed and transformed into farmland. What is more, the lemurs are hunted by humans. They are not kept in captivity.
