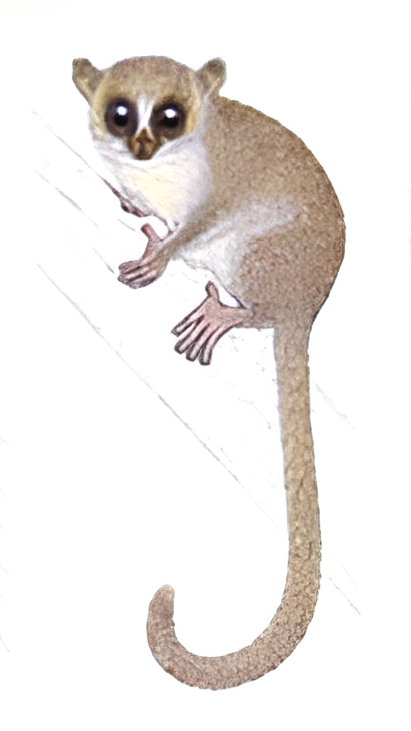

Conservation status
- Endangered (IUCN 3.1)
- CITES Appendix I

Scientific classification
- Kingdom: Animalia
- Phylum: Chordata
- Class: Mammalia
- Infraclass: Placentalia
- Order: Primates
- Suborder: Strepsirrhini
- Family: Cheirogaleidae
- Genus: Microcebus
- Species: M. jonahi

Binomial name
- Microcebus jonahi Schüssler et al., 2020

= Microcebus jonahi =

Species of primate

Microcebus jonahi, or Jonah's mouse lemur, is a tiny species of primate. It weighs 60 g (2.1 oz) and has a body length of around 13 cm (5.1 in) and its tail measures around 13 cm (5.1 in) as well. It is the 25th recognized species of mouse lemur and the 108th recognized species of lemur.

== Description ==
Jonah's mouse lemur has small ears and the characteristic huge eyes of lemurs with a distinct white stripe between the eyes. It has short, dense fur with a white with slightly yellowish belly and a brownish back. It weighs 60 g (2.1 oz) and has a body length of around 13 cm (5.1 in) and its tail measures around 13 cm as well.

== Distribution ==
Jonah's mouse lemur lives in northeastern Madagascar, including within the protected Mananara National Park. The species was named after Malagasy primatologist Dr. Jonah Ratsimbazafy.

== Conservation status ==
The forested area in the region where the Jonah's mouse lemur is found is undergoing massive deforestation. In northeast Madagascar, forest cover declined from 12,039 km^{2} (4,648 sq mi) in the early 1990s to 7,501 km^{2} (2,896 sq mi) in 2018. Once an uninterrupted stretch of rainforest, it has been whittled down to fragments. The fragmentation is expected to intensify, stranding the mouse lemurs, curtailing their access to food, and narrowing their genetic diversity.

== See also ==
- List of primates described in the 2020s
- List of living mammal species described in the 2020s
