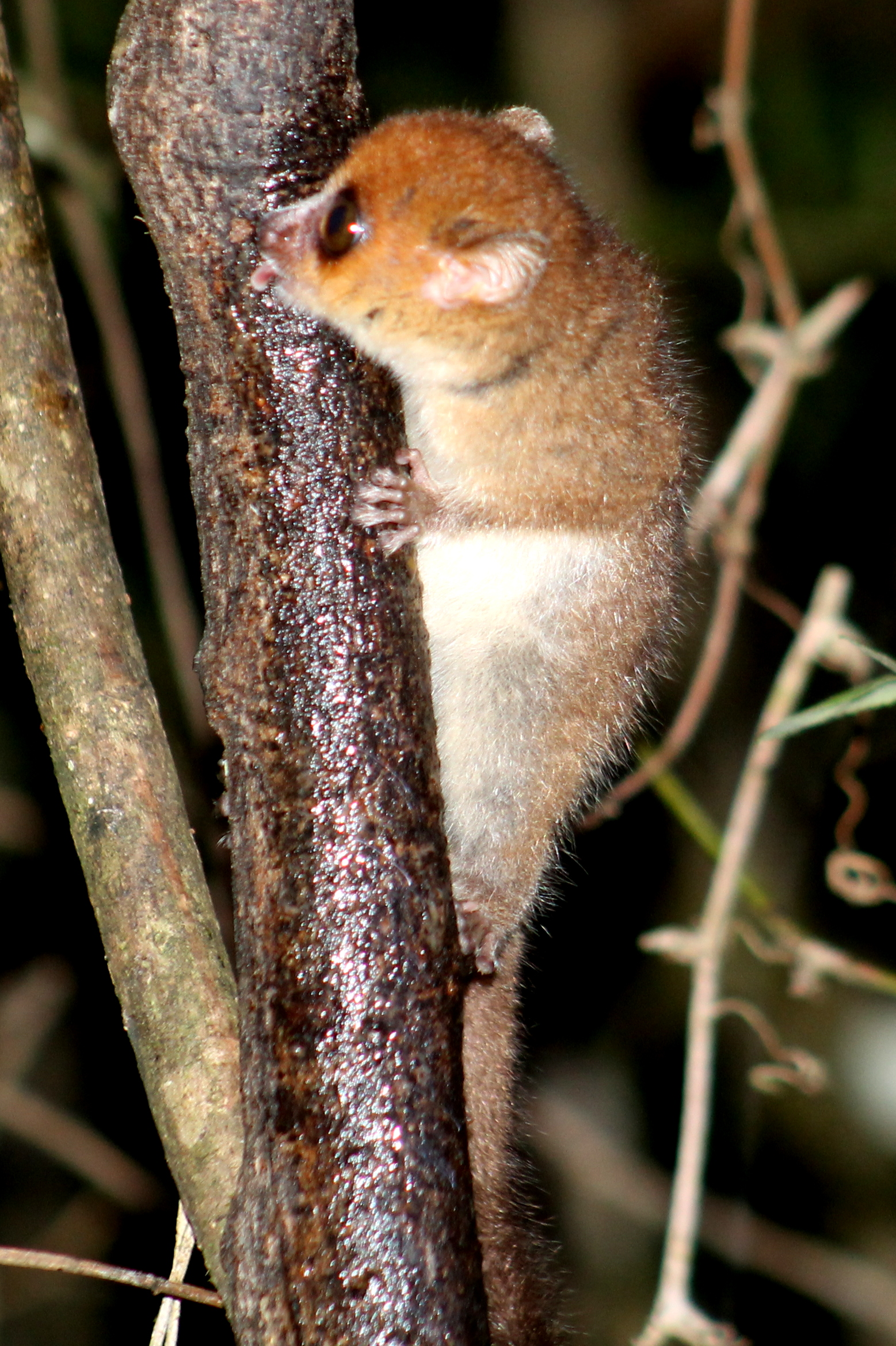
- Brown mouse lemur (Microcebus rufus)

Conservation status
- CITES Appendix I

Scientific classification
- Kingdom: Animalia
- Phylum: Chordata
- Class: Mammalia
- Order: Primates
- Suborder: Strepsirrhini
- Superfamily: Lemuroidea
- Family: Cheirogaleidae; Gray, 1873

Type genus
- Cheirogaleus É. Geoffroy, 1812

Genera
- Cheirogaleus; Microcebus; Mirza; Allocebus; Phaner
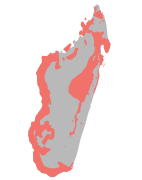
- Cheirogaleidae distribution

Synonyms
- Microcebina Gray, 1870^{[a]}; Cheirogalina Gray, 1872

= Cheirogaleidae =

Family of lemurs

The Cheirogaleidae are the family of strepsirrhine primates containing the various dwarf and mouse lemurs. Like all other lemurs, cheirogaleids live exclusively on the island of Madagascar.

== Characteristics ==
Cheirogaleids are smaller than the other lemurs and, in fact, they are the smallest primates. They have soft, long fur, colored grey-brown to reddish on top, with a generally brighter underbelly. Typically, they have small ears, large, close-set eyes, and long hind legs. Like all strepsirrhines, they have fine claws at the second toe of the hind legs. They grow to a size of only 13 to 28 cm, with a tail that is very long, sometimes up to one and a half times as long as the body. They weigh no more than 500 grams, with some species weighing as little as 60 grams.

Dwarf and mouse lemurs are nocturnal and arboreal. They are excellent climbers and can also jump far, using their long tails for balance. When on the ground (a rare occurrence), they move by hopping on their hind legs. They spend the day in tree hollows or leaf nests. Cheirogaleids are typically solitary, but sometimes live together in pairs.

Their eyes possess a tapetum lucidum, a light-reflecting layer that improves their night vision. Some species, such as the lesser dwarf lemur, store fat at the hind legs and the base of the tail, and hibernate. Unlike lemurids, they have long upper incisors, although they do have the comb-like teeth typical of all strepsirhines. They have the dental formula: 2.1.3.32.1.3.3

Cheirogaleids are omnivores, eating fruits, flowers and leaves (and sometimes nectar), as well as insects, spiders, and small vertebrates.

The females usually have three pairs of nipples. After a meager 60-day gestation, they will bear two to four (usually two or three) young. After five to six weeks, the young are weaned and become fully mature near the end of their first year or sometime in their second year, depending on the species. In human care, they can live for up to 15 years, although their life expectancy in the wild is probably significantly shorter.

== Classification ==
The five genera of cheirogaleids contain 42 species.

- Infraorder Lemuriformes
  - Family Cheirogaleidae
    - Genus Cheirogaleus: dwarf lemurs
      - Montagne d'Ambre dwarf lemur, Cheirogaleus andysabini
      - Furry-eared dwarf lemur, Cheirogaleus crossleyi
      - Groves' dwarf lemur, Cheirogaleus grovesi
      - Lavasoa dwarf lemur, Cheirogaleus lavasoensis
      - Greater dwarf lemur, Cheirogaleus major
      - Fat-tailed dwarf lemur, Cheirogaleus medius
      - Lesser iron-gray dwarf lemur, Cheirogaleus minusculus
      - Ankarana dwarf lemur, Cheirogaleus shethi
      - Sibree's dwarf lemur, Cheirogaleus sibreei
      - Thomas' dwarf lemur, Cheirogaleus thomasi
    - Genus Microcebus: mouse lemurs^{[b]}
      - Arnhold's mouse lemur, Microcebus arnholdi
      - Madame Berthe's mouse lemur, Microcebus berthae
      - Bongolava mouse lemur Microcebus bongolavensis
      - Boraha mouse lemur Microcebus boraha
      - Danfoss' mouse lemur Microcebus danfossi
      - Ganzhorn's mouse lemur. Microcebus ganzhorni
      - Gerp's mouse lemur. Microcebus gerpi
      - Reddish-gray mouse lemur, Microcebus griseorufus
      - Jolly's mouse lemur, Microcebus jollyae
      - Jonah's mouse lemur, Microcebus jonahi
      - Goodman's mouse lemur, Microcebus lehilahytsara
      - MacArthur's mouse lemur, Microcebus macarthurii
      - Claire's mouse lemur, Microcebus mamiratra, synonymous to M. lokobensis^{[b]}
      - Bemanasy mouse lemur, Microcebus manitatra
      - Margot Marsh's mouse lemur, Microcebus margotmarshae
      - Marohita mouse lemur, Microcebus marohita
      - Mittermeier's mouse lemur, Microcebus mittermeieri
      - Gray mouse lemur, Microcebus murinus
      - Pygmy mouse lemur, Microcebus myoxinus
      - Golden-brown mouse lemur, Microcebus ravelobensis
      - Brown mouse lemur, Microcebus rufus
      - Sambirano mouse lemur, Microcebus sambiranensis
      - Simmons' mouse lemur, Microcebus simmonsi
      - Anosy mouse lemur. Microcebus tanosi
      - Northern rufous mouse lemur, Microcebus tavaratra
    - Genus Mirza: giant mouse lemurs
      - Coquerel's giant mouse lemur or Coquerel's dwarf lemur, Mirza coquereli
      - Northern giant mouse lemur, Mirza zaza
    - Genus Allocebus
      - Hairy-eared dwarf lemur, Allocebus trichotis
    - Genus Phaner: fork-marked lemurs
      - Masoala fork-marked lemur, Phaner furcifer
      - Pale fork-marked lemur, Phaner pallescens
      - Pariente's fork-marked lemur, Phaner parienti
      - Amber Mountain fork-marked lemur, Phaner electromontis

== Footnotes ==
- ^{a} According to the letter of the International Code of Zoological Nomenclature, the correct name for this family should be Microcebidae, but the name Cheirogaleidae has been retained for stability.
- ^{b} In 2008, 7 new species of Microcebus were formally recognized, but Microcebus lokobensis (Lokobe mouse lemur) was not among the additions, even though it was described in 2006. Therefore, its status as a species is still questionable.
