= Jolly's mouse lemur =

Conservation status
- Endangered (IUCN 3.1)
- CITES Appendix I

Scientific classification
- Kingdom: Animalia
- Phylum: Chordata
- Class: Mammalia
- Order: Primates
- Suborder: Strepsirrhini
- Family: Cheirogaleidae
- Genus: Microcebus
- Species: M. jollyae

Binomial name
- Microcebus jollyae Louis et al., 2006
- Distribution of M. jollyae

Species of lemur

Jolly's mouse lemur (Microcebus jollyae) is a species of mouse lemur from Mananjary and Kianjavato in Madagascar. The species is named in honor of primatologist Alison Jolly.

Jolly's mouse lemur is uniformly reddish-brown with a small white patch on the snout and a completely gray belly.

The finding was announced June 21, 2006 at the Conservation International Global Symposium in Antananarivo, Madagascar, along with the discovery of Mittermeier's mouse lemur Microcebus mittermeieri and Simmons' mouse lemur Microcebus simmonsi as separate species. These new species were also officially announced in a paper in the International Journal of Primatology.
