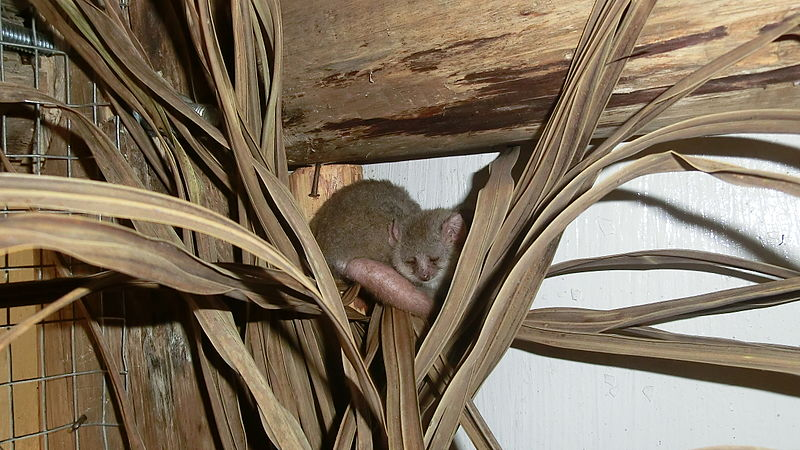

Conservation status
- Least Concern (IUCN 3.1)
- CITES Appendix I

Scientific classification
- Kingdom: Animalia
- Phylum: Chordata
- Class: Mammalia
- Order: Primates
- Suborder: Strepsirrhini
- Family: Cheirogaleidae
- Genus: Microcebus
- Species: M. griseorufus

Binomial name
- Microcebus griseorufus Kollmann, 1910
- Distribution of M. griseorufus

= Reddish-gray mouse lemur =

Species of mammal

The reddish-gray mouse lemur (Microcebus griseorufus) also known as the gray-brown mouse lemur or rufous-gray mouse lemur, is a small, solitary-but-social, nocturnal and omnivorous primate from the Western Madagascar in the region around Beza Mahafaly Reserve, north to Lamboharana. Like the other lemur species, the reddish-grey mouse lemur is endemic to Madagascar. They generally live in the drier regions of the island. It is categorized as least concerned in the IUCN Red List.

== Appearance and morphology ==
Microcebus griseorufus has a pelage color that is alternating light neutral gray, pale neutral gray, and light pale neutral gray dorsally and ventrally light grayish-white on the anterior two-thirds and bicolored light grayish-white and pale neutral gray on the posterior one-third. It has a cinnamon colored dorsal stripe running from the crown of the head or the shoulders to the end of the tail. The head of this species has a pale neutral gray spot above the nose, cinnamon around the eyes, a clay colored crown, and ears that are light neutral gray. The dorsal side of the tail is cinnamon colored while the ventral side is grayish-beige on the most distal two-thirds and cinnamon with faint brownish black streaks on the proximal one-third. The hands and feet are colored grayish-white and the vibrissae are dark in color. This species has a relatively robust skull. The size of the reddish-gray brown mouse lemur ranges from 25 to about 28 cm (9.8 to about 11.0 in), while their mass can range between 46 and 79 g (1.6 and 2.8 oz). It is assumed that like other nocturnal species, the reddish-gray mouse lemur has very sensitive ears, making them important for communication, social encounters, predator avoidance, and critter finding.

With differences in fur color so broad that by appearance alone, individuals have been mistaken as different species in the past. Despite their strikingly different appearance, these reddish-gray mouse lemur may, in fact, not be so different genetically and belong to the same species. Habitat type and factors, and genetic distance have both been found to be uncorrelated to the different pelage, and thus, they have little to not impact on the fur color of the individuals.

Even though their perception of color is different from human beings, vision is still important to the reddish-gray mouse lemur as they may recognize one another from facial patterns. It also dictates their activity level and when they start coming out to start foraging (i.e. when light levels are low enough). This can affect their lifespan, reproduction, and seasonal torpor due to photoperiodism. Like many other species in their suborder, the reddish-gray mouse lemur have tapetum lucidum, a characteristic that makes it easier for them to navigate in environments with low light levels.

Research has found that the morphology of their hands and feet may vary slightly depending on the individual's habitat due to the difference in tree types. Individuals in the from the gallery forests, which have an abundance of small, flexible and high canopies, with many horizontal adjacent branches will have hook-like hands for easier locomotion. Those who live in spiny forests have hands formed like clamps for easier grasping, ground movement and vertical supports, since spiny forests have more open spaces, with large-trunked trees favoring such characteristics.

== Ecology ==
=== Habitat and distribution ===
The habitats of the reddish-gray mouse lemur include the spiny forests and gallery forests, as well as the shrublands or the dry forests near the Western and Southwestern coasts of Madagascar. They are one of the few mammals to occupy these driest regions of the island. The spiny forests have harsh and unpredictable conditions, with highly variable ambient temperatures, as well as scarce food and water sources compared to the other habitat types. However, there is a lower population density in spiny forests and other more arid areas compared to more humid regions of this mouse lemur's habitat, since the quality of food they provide is lower. The species has been observed to be male dispersed.

=== Feeding and diet ===
The reddish-gray mouse lemur is an omnivore. They feed on fruits, insects, flowers, and plant exudate (i.e. gum, sap, etc.). There are variations in their diet depending on the season, environmental conditions, food availability, localities, chosen habitat, as well as their sex. Before the wet season ends, the reddish-grey mouse lemur prepares for the dry season (April–May to October) by optimizing their food intake and engage in opportunistic fattening while the food resources are higher. During the drier regions or seasons, the reddish-gray mouse lemur will consume more gums and other plant exudates than other parts of their diet, such as fruits, since they are more renewable and more readily available under these conditions. Females under the same arid conditions may consume more exudates but fewer insects than their male counterparts. Their diet may also be affected due to sleeping associations. Individuals within a sleeping group have been observed to consume more fruits and less plant exudates compared to individuals who are not associated. After observing the species in a habitat with more food availability, a research has found that the reddish-grey mouse lemur has a preference in their food, favoring fruits over plant gums or exudates, while insects are hunted at a given opportunity. Even if arthropod give more nutrients, they are not as easily found, accessible or defended than fruits and trees.

=== Mating and reproduction ===
Little is known about the reproduction and parenting of the reddish-gray mouse lemur, but it is known that, much like other mouse lemurs, they are polyestrous (i.e. they have more than one estrus cycle per year) and are seasonal breeders. Their reproductive season last for a long time compared to some other species, during the wet and rainy season, which is usually between September and May. This may vary by individuals, however, as factors such as nutritional balance and quality may affect both the survival of the mother and reproductive success. A research on mouse lemur reproduction showed that estrus period seem to occur more often around October (though the number of females experiencing it may vary monthly and yearly). During the driest months, which are between May and July, females may be non-reproductive and more focused on survival than reproduction. A female may give birth to multiple offspring in a single litter. The reproduction process may also involve mate-guarding, and alloparenting in female pairs since estrus may not be synchronous, but lactation may occur simultaneously, easing alloparental care. Outside the mating season, courtship may occur through trill calls, implying that a long-term relationship prior to mating occurs.

== Behavior ==
The reddish-gray mouse lemur may engage in various social interactions, such as grooming their associate or foraging near one another. Other observed behaviors include urine-washing, which have been used in the control of space (e.g. sleeping sites) and mate monopolization.

=== Social structure ===
The reddish-grey mouse lemur have a dispersed social system. Like other mouse lemurs species, they have a matriarchal social organization. An example of this would be that females reddish-gray mouse lemur have been observed to have higher priority than their male counterpart when it comes to food resources, especially if they are scarce. In agonistic relationships, females were found to win more often than males by a large margin. Females also have the priority (and monopoly) on fruiting trees, and they also have more power and control over food resources, often engaging in cooperative management with fellow females. In pairs of females with young, the leading females are very often the larger and heavier ones.

=== Communication ===
Like many other mouse lemurs, the reddish-grey mouse lemur is a relatively solitary animal. While they do have a social system, it is a dispersed one. Individuals rarely come into physical contact when they are active (e.g. when individuals are foraging). However, despite their mostly solitary nature, communication and social signaling between individual mouse lemur still occur through auditory and olfactory means. Trill calls are used during courtship or mating season, and sequences of short whistles are used as alarm calls. Unlike other species where social interactions can happen through visual cues (e.g. patterns or color on the fur), that may not be entirely the case for the reddish-gray mouse lemur due to the fact that the difference in fur color within the species, which is visible to human beings, is likely not visible among themselves.

=== Sleeping associations ===
While reddish-grey mouse lemurs are mostly solitary animals, they do have sleeping associations, or sleeping groups, and are commonly formed among species of mouse lemur, including the reddish-grey mouse lemur. They may use vines, birds' nests or branches' hollows as sleeping areas. They are considered to be very safe from predators, and help in thermoregulation of the ambient temperature. The sleeping sites tend to be located near feeding trees. Associates at sleeping sites usually sleep apart, and are mostly pairs of adults; sleeping groups rarely included more than two individuals, and usually meet about an hour before dawn. Pairs may change partners at any time. The reason for these sleeping associations is not a tactic to defend against predators, but for more social reasons, such as the opportunity for higher quality diet (i.e. fruit trees), and alloparenting. During rainy seasons, sleeping associations have been observed to be a more common occurrence compared to the dry seasons.

=== Torpor and hibernation ===
Because of the unpredictability and challenges of their habitat, the reddish-gray mouse lemur has developed flexibility in their energy-saving tactics: torpor and prolonged hibernation. They vary in length, but many individuals may engage in either irregular and short torpors, daily torpors, longer torpors that spans over a few days, or simply hibernation lasting for a few weeks. During the dry season, many individuals undergo torpor to conserve energy, though females have been observed to undergo seasonal torpor more frequently and for longer than males. The length of the torpor, and the level of variation in thermal physiology also vary a lot between different individuals, even if they were to live in the same regions. As such, the need and extent of the torpor depend the individual's conditions prior to the torpor or the hibernation.

== Conservation and threats ==
While mouse lemurs as a whole have been in rapid decline, the reddish-gray mouse lemur as a species is not a particularly threatened species compared to other similar species. However, it does still face decline in numbers and decrease in habitat area and habitat quality due to deforestation related to the timber industry, as well as agriculture and aquaculture. Due to the high amount of anthropogenic disturbances occurring at their habitat, the resources the reddish-grey mouse lemur needs is often cut often. Climate change also affect their distribution greatly through desertification. Conservation efforts include the education of residents, as well as land and water protection within protected zones, including Tsimanampetsotsa National Park, Beza Mahafaly Special Reserve, the Berenty Private Reserve, Mikea and Andohahela.
