= Lokobe National Park =

National park in Madagascar

- IUCN category II (national park)
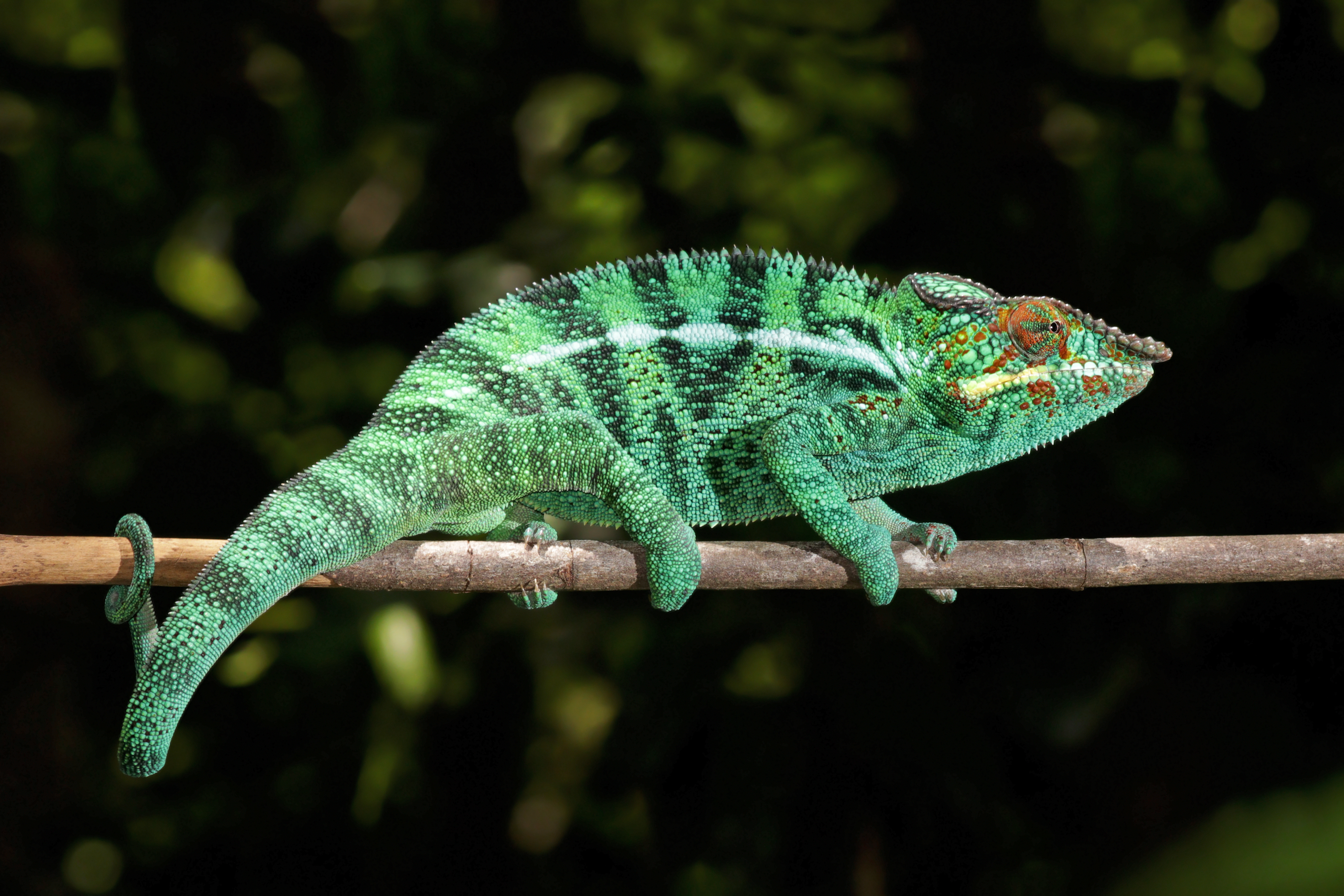
- Nosy Be panther chameleon
- Interactive map of Lokobe National Park
- Location: Antsiranana Province, Madagascar
- Coordinates: 13°23′57″S 48°19′6″E
- Area: 15.23 km^{2} (5.88 sq mi)
- Established: 1927

Lokobe National Park is a national park in northwestern Madagascar. It is located on southeastern side of Nosy Be, an island off the coast of Madagascar. It is known for its black lemurs and the beautiful Nosy Be panther chameleon.

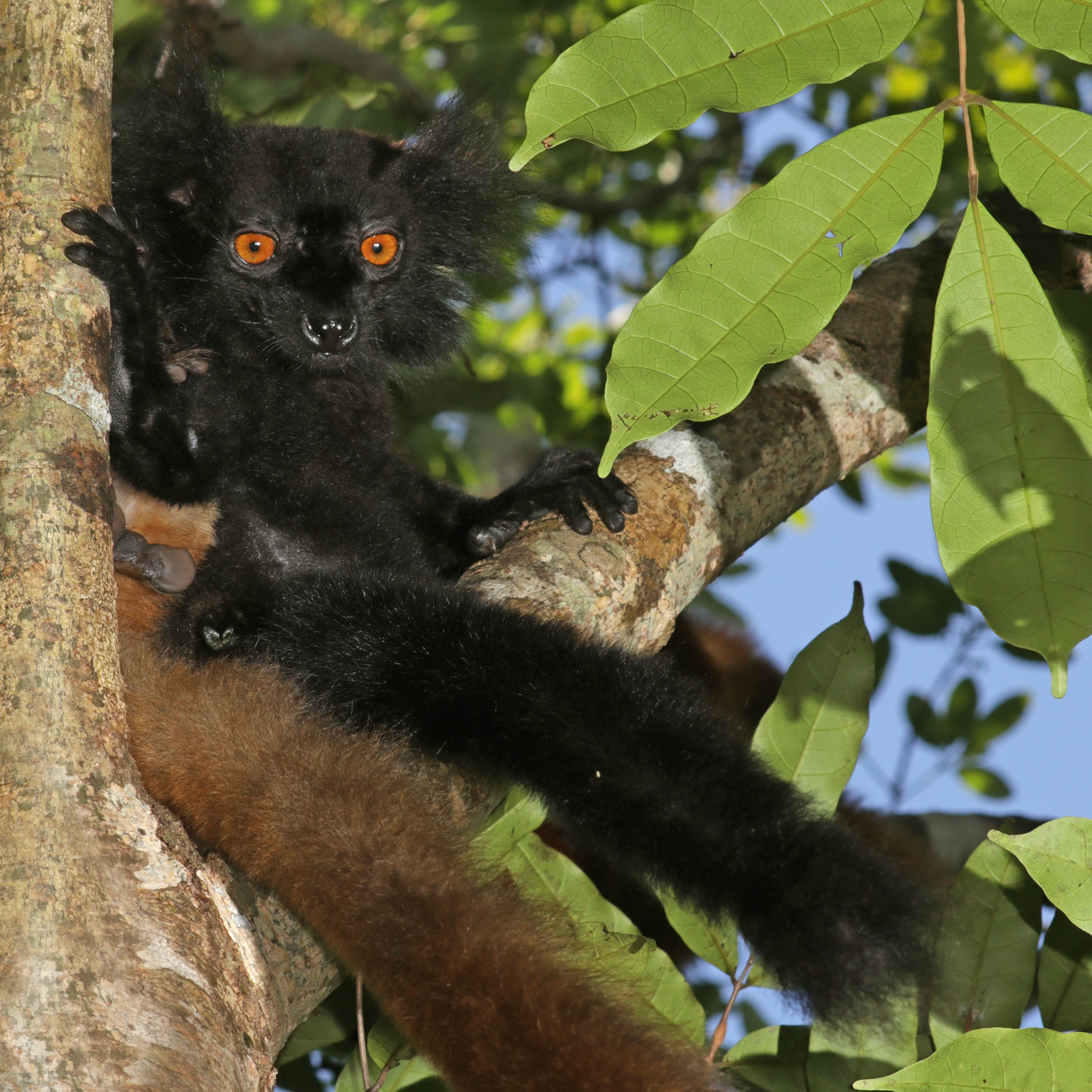
male black lemur

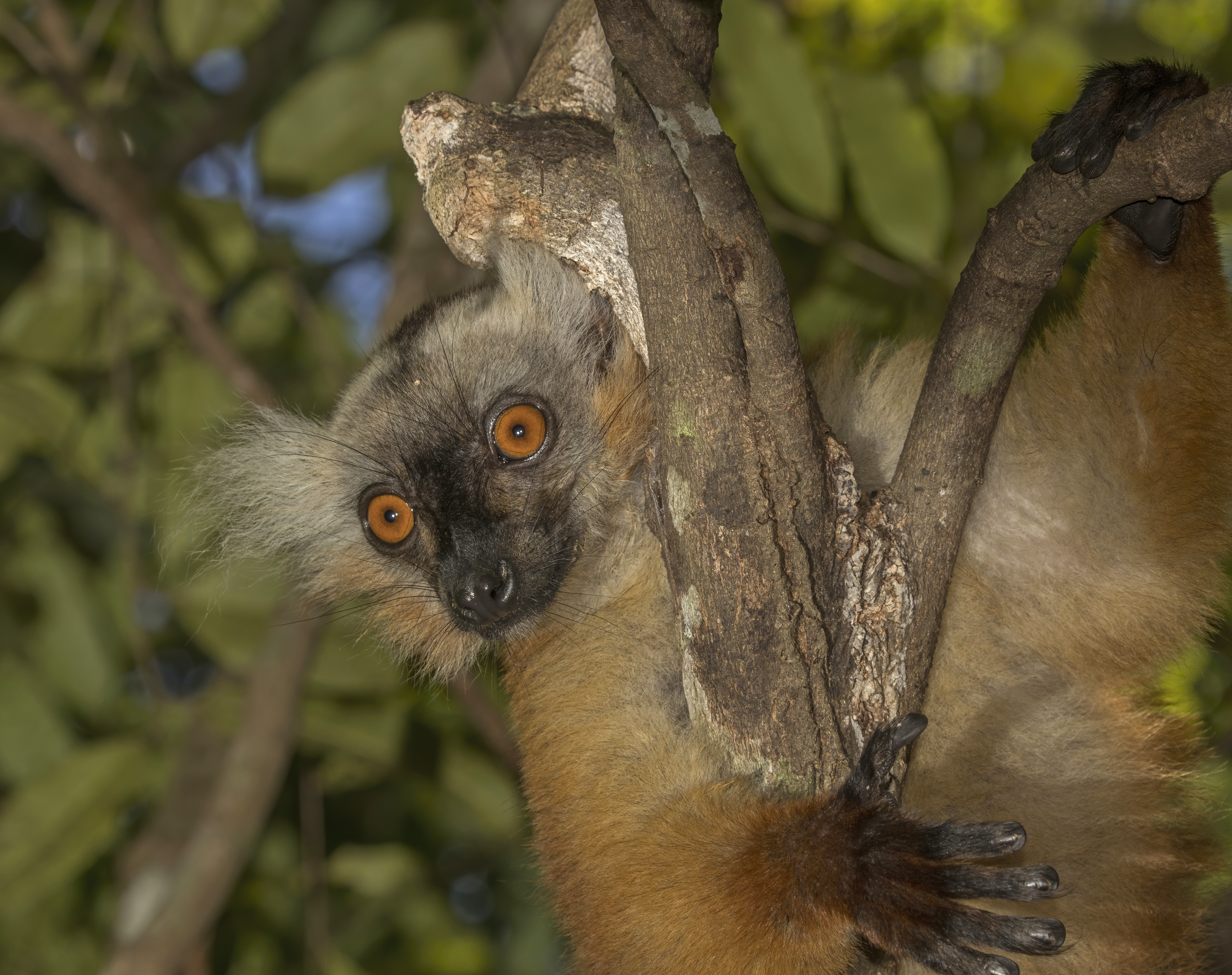
female black lemur

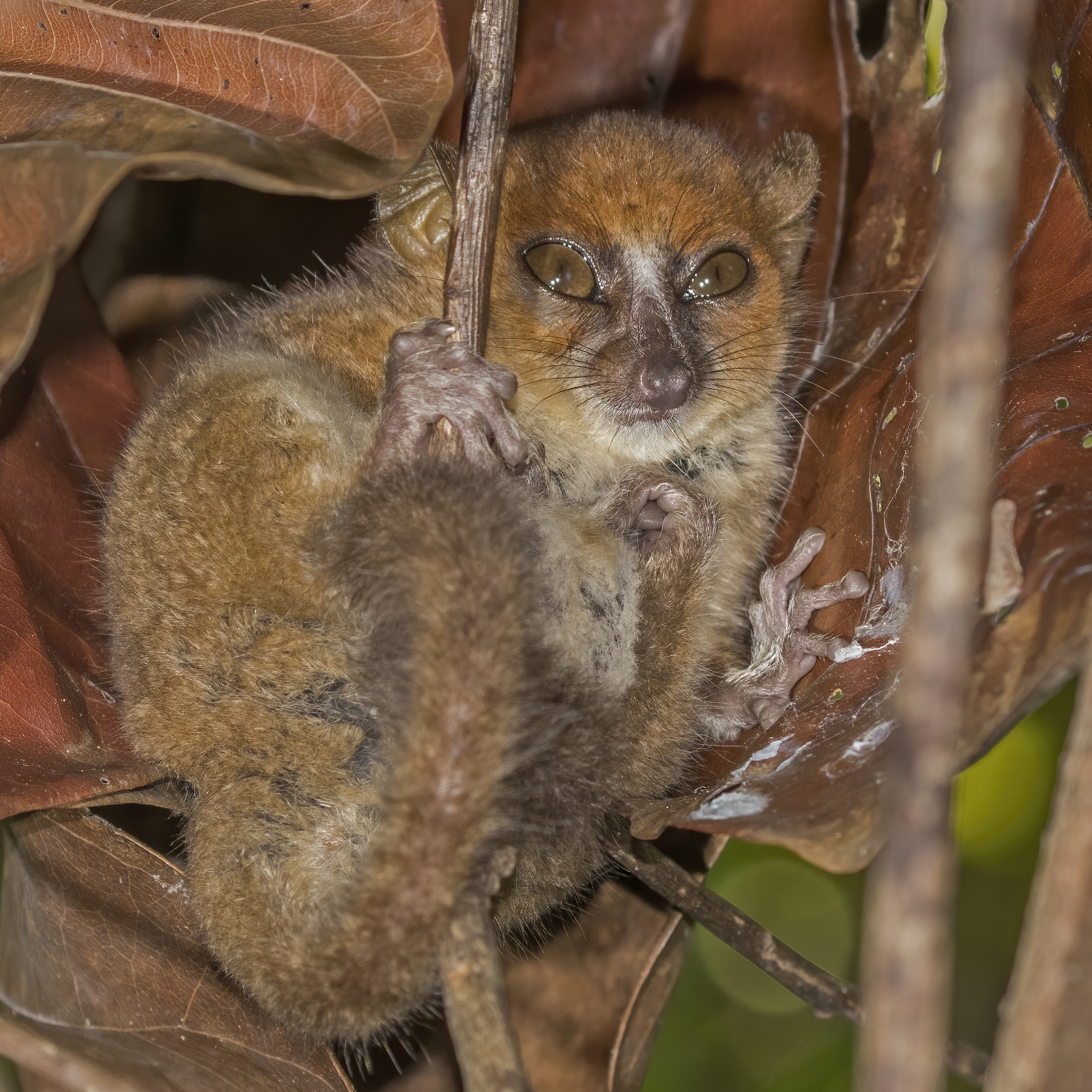
Nosy Be mouse lemur

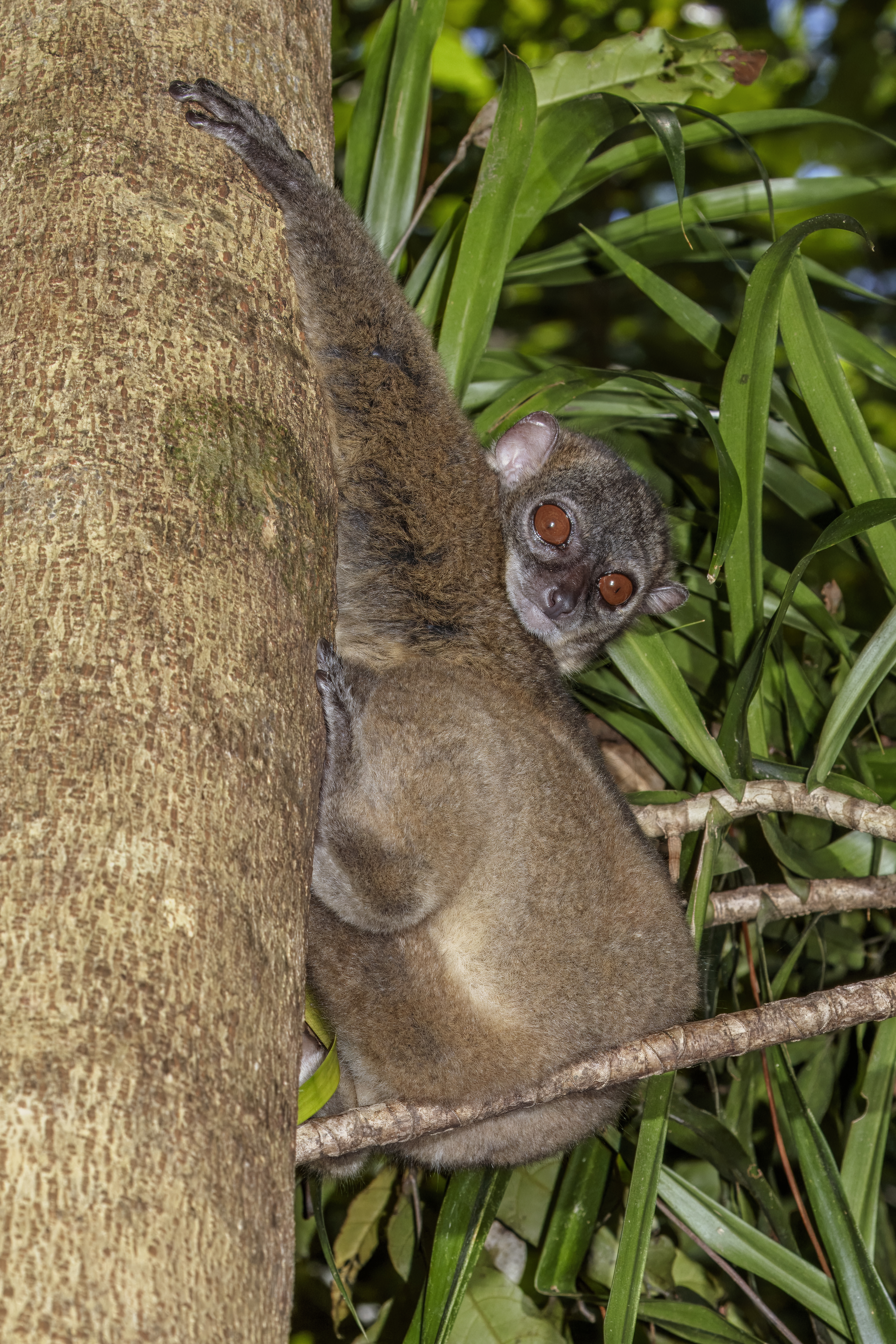
Nosy Be sportive lemur
