= Sambirano mouse lemur =

Conservation status
- Endangered (IUCN 3.1)
- CITES Appendix I (CITES)

Scientific classification
- Kingdom: Animalia
- Phylum: Chordata
- Class: Mammalia
- Order: Primates
- Suborder: Strepsirrhini
- Family: Cheirogaleidae
- Genus: Microcebus
- Species: M. sambiranensis

Binomial name
- Microcebus sambiranensis Rasoloarison et al., 2000
- Distribution of M. sambiranensis

Species of lemur

The Sambirano mouse lemur (Microcebus sambiranensis) is a small, recently discovered primate and like the other mouse lemurs can only be found on the island of Madagascar. The dorsal side is both cinnamon and rufous-cinnamon and is grey ventrally. It has vibrissae that are dark in color.

The species was discovered in northwestern Madagascar, in the Ankarana Special Reserve, where vegetation remains dense, after a survey was completed of the area. It was named as a separate species at the same time as the Madame Berthe's mouse lemur (Microcebus berthae) and northern rufous mouse lemur (Microcebus tavaratra).

Foliage tree sleeping sites prevent predatorial species interaction with Sambirano Mouse Lemurs.

Sambirano mouse lemurs are endemic to Madagascar and are currently prone to extinction. Long term reforestation in northwestern Madagascar may facilitate the conservation of this species.
