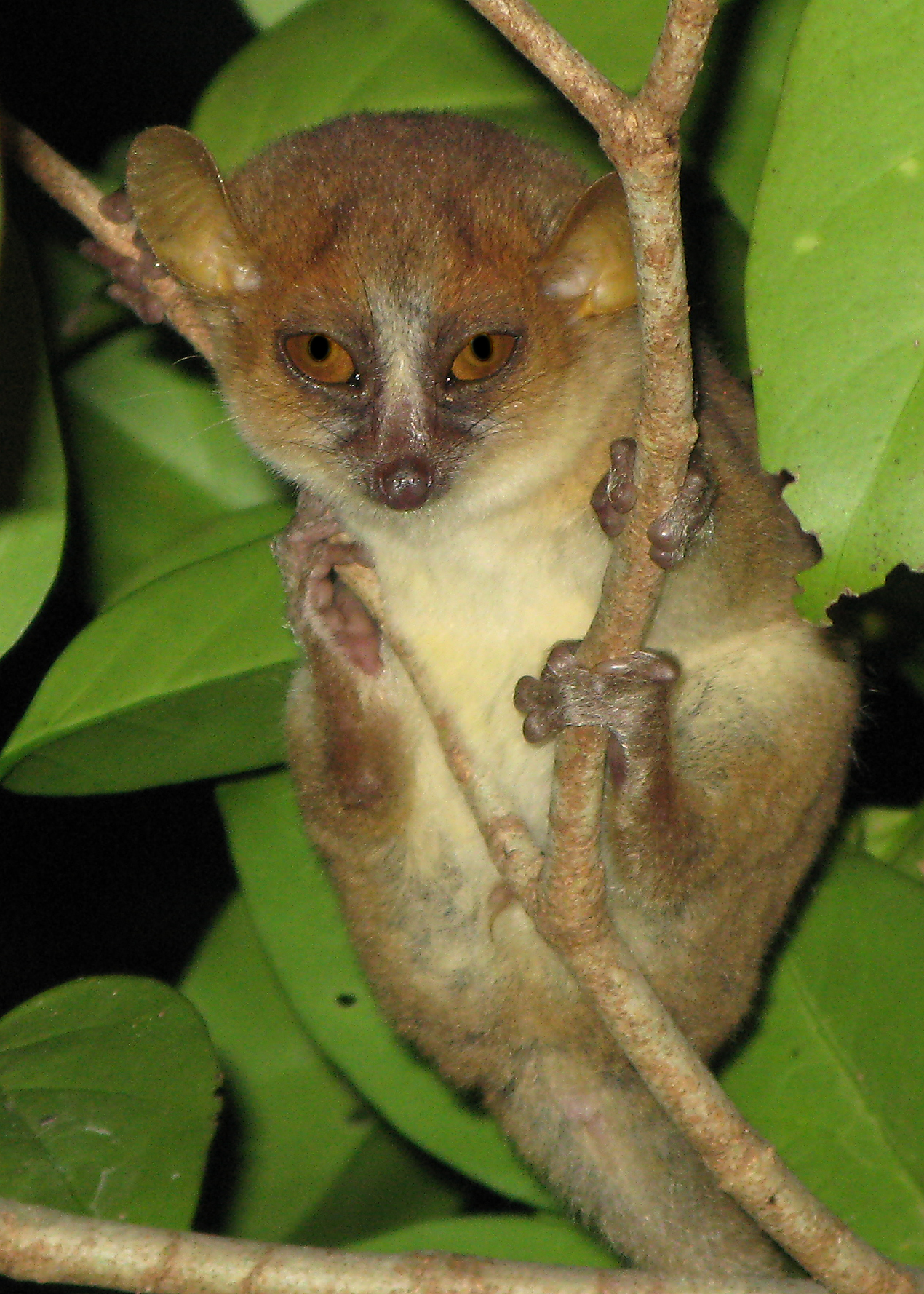

Conservation status
- Vulnerable (IUCN 3.1)
- CITES Appendix I

Scientific classification
- Kingdom: Animalia
- Phylum: Chordata
- Class: Mammalia
- Order: Primates
- Suborder: Strepsirrhini
- Family: Cheirogaleidae
- Genus: Microcebus
- Species: M. danfossi

Binomial name
- Microcebus danfossi Olivieri et al., 2007
- Distribution of M. danfossi

= Danfoss's mouse lemur =

Species of lemur

Danfoss's mouse lemur (Microcebus danfossi), or the Ambarijeby mouse lemur, is a species of mouse lemur endemic to Madagascar. It lives in western deciduous forest within a limited range between the Sofia River and the Maevarano River. This species has been found in substantial populations in the Ambarijevy, Anjajavy, and Beanamaolo forests in Madagascar. Their lifespan is about 5 years but can live up to 10 years. They are part of the infraorder called lemuriformes which represents 20% of the entire primates diversity and over 60% of the mammalian genera of Madagascar.

There is no current estimate of the number of individuals present in the wild, nor in captivity. However the IUCN red list provides the number of 2.2 to 5 individuals per hectares as the species density and that its population is decreasing.

== Habitat ==
Their average individual home range from 50 to 400 ha (120 to 990 acres) of dry deciduous forests elevated up to 780 m (2,560 ft). Their habitat can be separated into sixteen forest fragments. They tend to take shelter in tree holes where they spend most of their days to preserve their energy.

== Diet ==
Dry deciduous forests are poor in resources which limits the species' diet, yet mouse lemurs in general have a quite diverse diet including insect secretions, arthropods, small vertebrates, fruits and flowers. Danfoss's mouse lemur is said to be particularly fond of bananas as it is often the food of choice in captures for research projects.

== Description ==
Microcebus danfossi belongs to the genus of the smallest primates on the planet. However, compared to the other species from the same genus, it is a relatively large. It is a reddish mouse lemur with a total length of 25 to 29 cm (9.8 to 11.4 in), including a 15 to 17 cm (5.9 to 6.7 in) tail. Danfoss's mouse lemur has short, dense fur, and a white stripe running between the eyes. The species has the overall same physical characteristics as other species of mouse lemurs but they all present high levels of genetic diversity. Their metabolism functions in a certain way that enables them to save energy and water by changing their body temperature to ambient levels.

== Reproduction ==
Their reproduction period can be quite long from may to October, even sometimes November and depends less on seasons than other lemur species since their habitat is near a humid, low-altitude forest with more resources available to them. They share the same reproduction schedule as others such as M. ravelobensis and M. bongolavensis. Their reproduction generally starts around 1 years old and gestate for a bout 60 days. Most females give birth every year, creating a new generation of Danfoss's mouse lemur approximately every 1 to 5 years.

== Behavior ==
=== Social organizations ===
Microcebus danfossi is a nocturnal solitary forager that lives in dispersed social organisations, even though they often create regular sleeping groups composed by either only related females, related males and females, or alone. In fact, most females only interact with related females meaning from the same sleeping group. They tend to avoid encounters with females from neighboring groups. Considering their behavior in the broad sense of the word, it is relatively similar to other Microcebus species in the north western regions when it comes to conflict and aggression (M. myoxinus, M. ravelobensis, M. bongolavensis). However, it seems that male sleeping groups show less social tolerance even if most sleeping groups are female dominant. Danfoss's mouse lemurs communicate by sound and odors to form these groups, more specifically use feces and urine to mark their presence.

=== Infant care ===
The weaning period lasts around several weeks and is provided by the mother even though some males were observed grooming, carrying and guarding. The limited weaning period gives little time for infants to socialize. In order for the mother to eat and feed its infant(s) they adopt the system called infant parking. It consists in leaving the infant(s) in their nest, tree hole, while the mother is gone foraging.

== Threats ==
Their main predators are raptors (owls, hawks, eagles), snakes (boas) and carnivores (mongooses and fossa) as well as introduced carnivores (dogs and cats). In fact predation rates concerning mouse lemurs are the highest amongst all primates mostly due to their small size and limited number of other mammal preys of approximately the same size. Nevertheless, the species' main threat today is human induced. Indeed, an estimation states that 90% of Madagascar's primary vegetation has already been lost. This includes the dry deciduous forest, the only habitat for Danfoss's mouse lemur. The important loss of habitat is mostly due to agriculture and pasture. Furthermore, the species is also hunted for the exotic pet trade even though the deforestation is the main issue.

== Conservation ==
Human activity especially agriculture is the main responsible for loss of habitat which created fragmented forested. They present an important issue in the conservation of the species because it isolates them in small groups creating a bottleneck effect which causes significant reduction of genetic diversity since they can only reproduce within a small number of individuals. Their population collapse is estimated to have started about 100 to 85 years ago and represents the disappearance of around 11 thousand individuals. The Bayes Factor analyses demonstrates a correlation between the appearance of bottlenecks and the two most recent periods of human colonization.

=== Status ===
According to the IUCN, the species is currently considered vulnerable since 2018 but was considered endangered in 2014. It is complicated for organizations to put in place conservation plans for this species because of its limited access and the lack of information they have on it. However, the IUCN is quite clear on the critical condition of the species. It states that if no conservation measures are put in place they predict the entire loss of the Danfoss's mouse lemur habitat in 2080 by only considering climate change.Without any adapted habitat, the species is unlikely going to survive much longer after. Considering their current status and the rate at which the species is decreasing, it is predicted to be extinct before, given that their main threat is human activity and not climate change. Today, most organizations agree that the current measures are not sufficient. Amongst them are international legislation and international management and trade controls. In addition, only one fragmented forest, Bora, is part of the National Network of protected areas.
