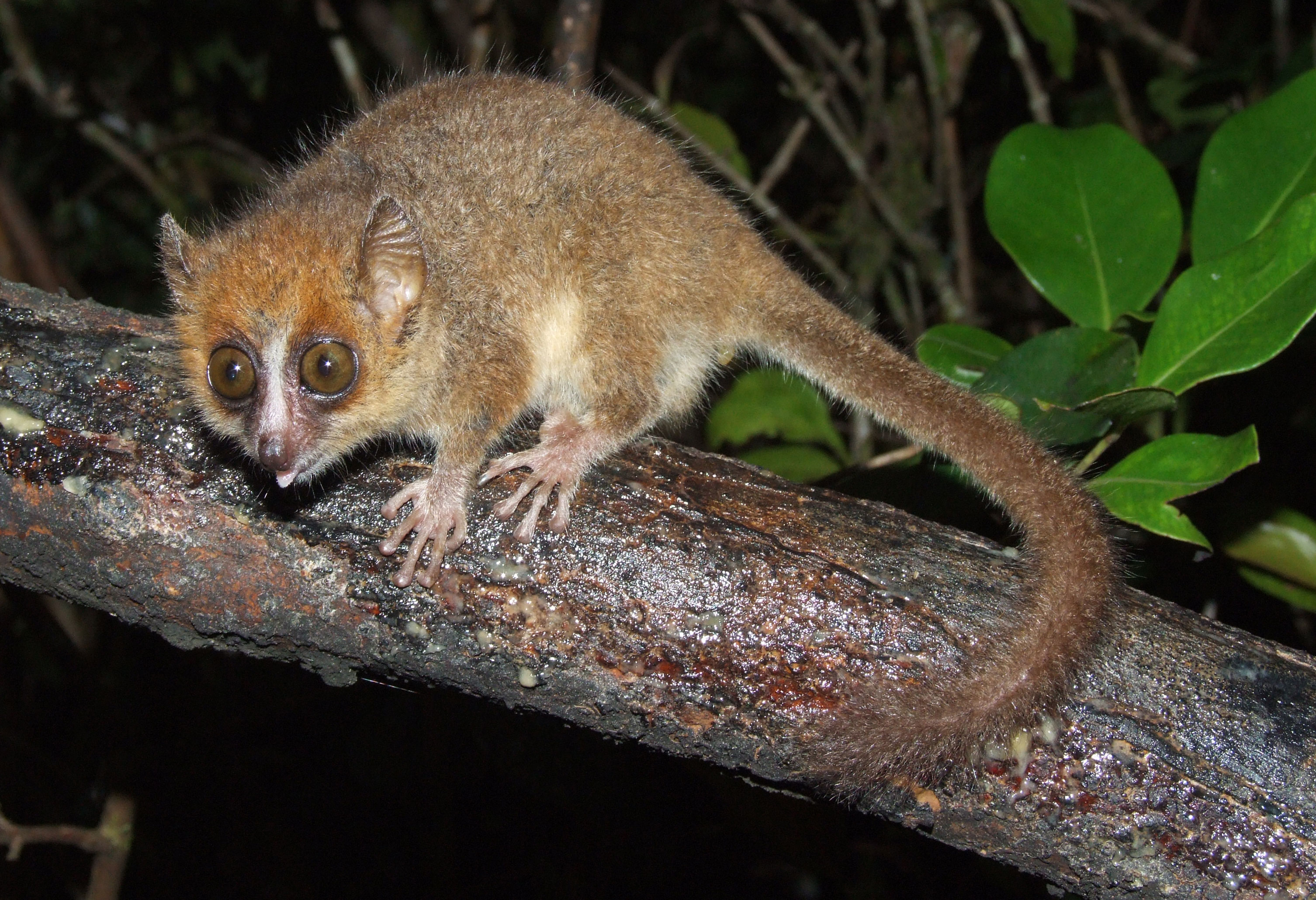
- Pygmy mouse lemur (M. myoxinus)

Conservation status
- CITES Appendix I

Scientific classification
- Kingdom: Animalia
- Phylum: Chordata
- Class: Mammalia
- Order: Primates
- Suborder: Strepsirrhini
- Family: Cheirogaleidae
- Genus: Microcebus; É. Geoffroy, 1834

Type species
- Lemur pusillus É. Geoffroy, 1795

Diversity
- About 25 species
- Combined distribution of Microcebus

Synonyms
- Murilemur Gray, 1870; Scartes Swainson, 1835; Myscebus Lesson, 1840; Azema Gray, 1870; Gliscebus Lesson, 1840; Myocebus Wagner, 1841

= Mouse lemur =

Mouse lemurs

Genus of mammals

The mouse lemurs are nocturnal lemurs of the genus Microcebus. Like all lemurs, mouse lemurs are native to Madagascar.

Mouse lemurs have a combined head, body and tail length of 20–30 centimetres (7.9–11.8 in) and weigh 30–65 grams (1.1–2.3 oz), making them the smallest primates (the smallest species being Madame Berthe's mouse lemur); however, their weight fluctuates in response to daylight duration. Lemurs and mouse lemurs were announced by the IUCN as the most endangered of all vertebrates. There were two known mouse lemur species in 1992; by 2016, there were 24. It was estimated that the 24 mouse lemur species evolved from a common ancestor 18–11 million years ago. They can live for about 18 years in captivity. Gestation is about 2 months. The total population for mouse lemurs isn't yet known.

== Habitat ==
Mouse lemurs, like all lemurs, are endemic to Madagascar. They live within the treetops in dry deciduous forests, sub-arid thorn scrublands, and secondary forests, as well as in coastal and bamboo forests, making burrows in the tree trunks.

== Diet ==
Mouse lemurs are omnivorous; their diets are diverse and include insect secretions, arthropods, small vertebrates, gum, fruit, flowers, nectar, and also leaves and buds depending on the season.

== Morphology ==
Mouse lemurs are considered cryptic species—with very little morphological differences between the various species, but with high genetic diversity. Recent evidence points to differences in their mating calls, which are very diverse. Since mouse lemurs are nocturnal, they might not have evolved to look different, but have evolved various auditory and vocal systems.

Mouse lemur brains can weigh less than 2 grams (0.071 oz) while their testes can weigh 2.5 grams (0.088 oz).

As written in Genetics, mouse lemurs help to provide a more extensive understanding of the biology, behavior, and health of primates. Mouse lemurs are categorized as prosimian primates. They are among the smallest and most rapidly developing primates and are becoming more abundant in Madagascar and around the world. These tiny creatures are helping to prove valuable information about the biology and evolution of primates through the analysis of their phenotypes and mutations, especially as a model organism for human medical research.

== Behavior ==
Mouse lemurs live in a female dominated structure. Mouse lemurs are nocturnal, spending the day aloft the trees and at night gathering their food. During the dry season females will become less active and tend to rarely leave their homes, while the males go out and gather food. Mouse lemurs tend to live in closely related groups when no female kin are near, and the females sleep alone.

== Reproduction and evolution ==
Mouse lemurs are also known for their sperm competition. During breeding seasons, the testicles of male mouse lemurs increase in size to about 130% of their normal size. This was speculated to increase the sperm production thereby conferring an advantage for the individual to bear more offspring. There are various hypotheses relating the rapid evolution of mouse lemur species to this sperm competition. In sexually inactive females the vulva is sealed, during the reproductive cycle the vulva is open. The vaginal morphology is also based on the time of day. Analysis of the genomes of five different mouse lemur species revealed that Madagascar's biogeography had been undergoing change before the arrival of humans.

== Species ==
- Genus Microcebus: mouse lemurs
  - Arnhold's mouse lemur, M. arnholdi
  - Madame Berthe's mouse lemur, M. berthae
  - Bongolava mouse lemur M. bongolavensis
  - Boraha mouse lemur M. boraha
  - Danfoss' mouse lemur M. danfossi
  - Ganzhorn's mouse lemur. M. ganzhorni
  - Gerp's mouse lemur. M. gerpi
  - Reddish-gray mouse lemur, M. griseorufus
  - Jolly's mouse lemur, M. jollyae
  - Jonah's mouse lemur, M. jonahi
  - Goodman's mouse lemur, M. lehilahytsara
  - MacArthur's mouse lemur, M. macarthurii
  - Claire's mouse lemur, M. mamiratra, synonymous to M. lokobensis
  - Bemanasy mouse lemur, M. manitatra
  - Margot Marsh's mouse lemur, M. margotmarshae
  - Marohita mouse lemur, M. marohita
  - Mittermeier's mouse lemur, M. mittermeieri
  - Gray mouse lemur, M. murinus
  - Pygmy mouse lemur, M. myoxinus
  - Golden-brown mouse lemur, M. ravelobensis
  - Brown mouse lemur, M. rufus
  - Sambirano mouse lemur, M. sambiranensis
  - Simmons' mouse lemur, M. simmonsi
  - Anosy mouse lemur. M. tanosi
  - Northern rufous mouse lemur, M. tavaratra
