= MacArthur's mouse lemur =

Conservation status
- Endangered (IUCN 3.1)
- CITES Appendix I

Scientific classification
- Kingdom: Animalia
- Phylum: Chordata
- Class: Mammalia
- Order: Primates
- Suborder: Strepsirrhini
- Family: Cheirogaleidae
- Genus: Microcebus
- Species: M. macarthurii

Binomial name
- Microcebus macarthurii Radespiel et al., 2008
- Distribution of M. macarthurii

Species of lemur

MacArthur's mouse lemur (Microcebus macarthurii), or the Anjiahely mouse lemur, is a species of mouse lemur known only from Makira Natural Park in northeastern Madagascar.

The species is named in honor of the founder of the MacArthur Foundation, which financed the studies that included the discovery of this species.
