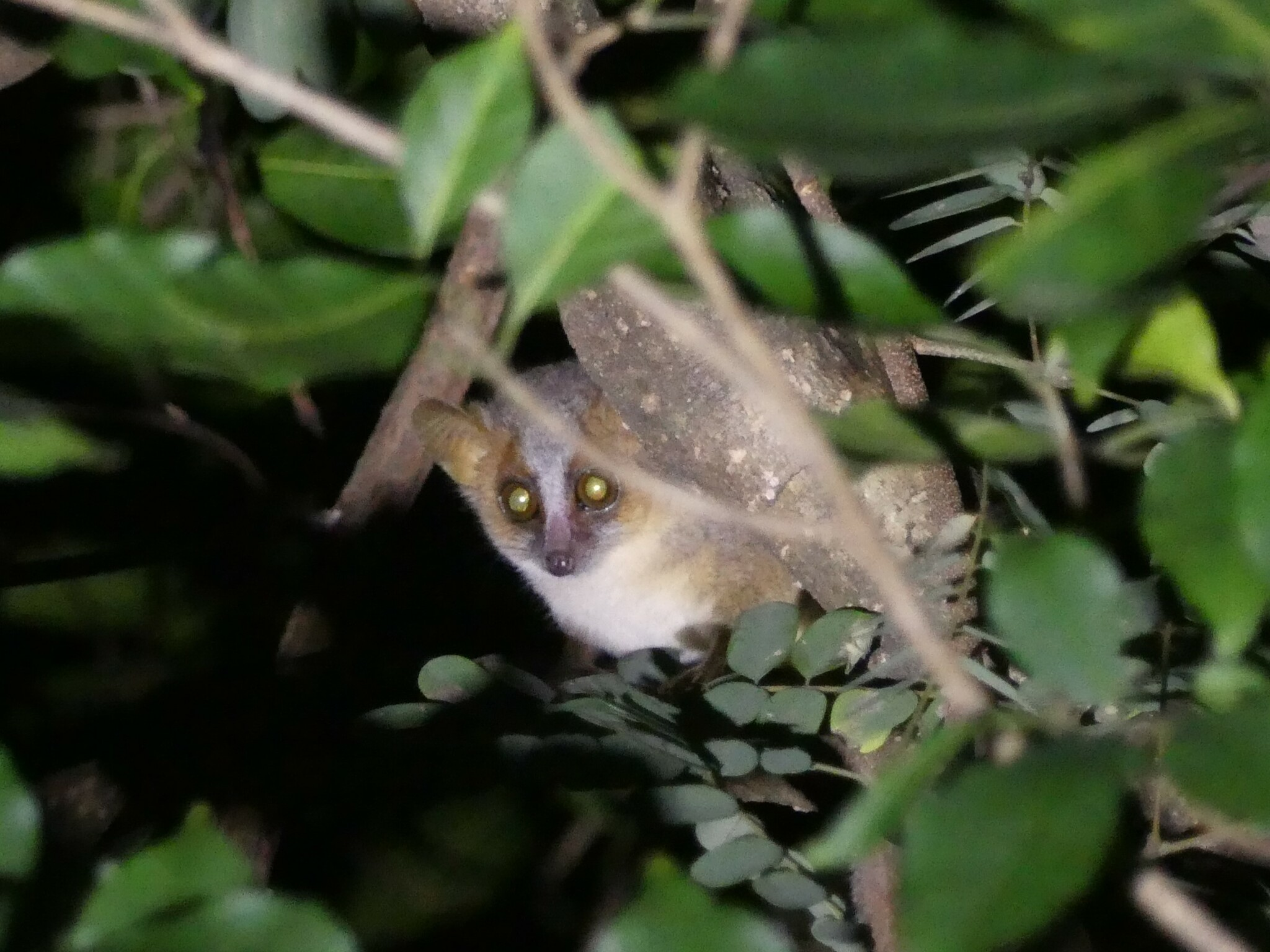

Conservation status
- Vulnerable (IUCN 3.1)
- CITES Appendix I

Scientific classification
- Kingdom: Animalia
- Phylum: Chordata
- Class: Mammalia
- Infraclass: Placentalia
- Order: Primates
- Suborder: Strepsirrhini
- Family: Cheirogaleidae
- Genus: Microcebus
- Species: M. ravelobensis

Binomial name
- Microcebus ravelobensis Zimmerman et al., 1998
- Distribution of M. ravelobensis

= Golden-brown mouse lemur =

Species of lemur

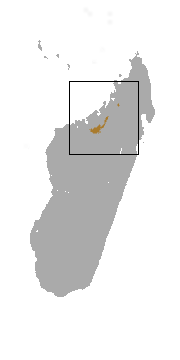
Geographic range

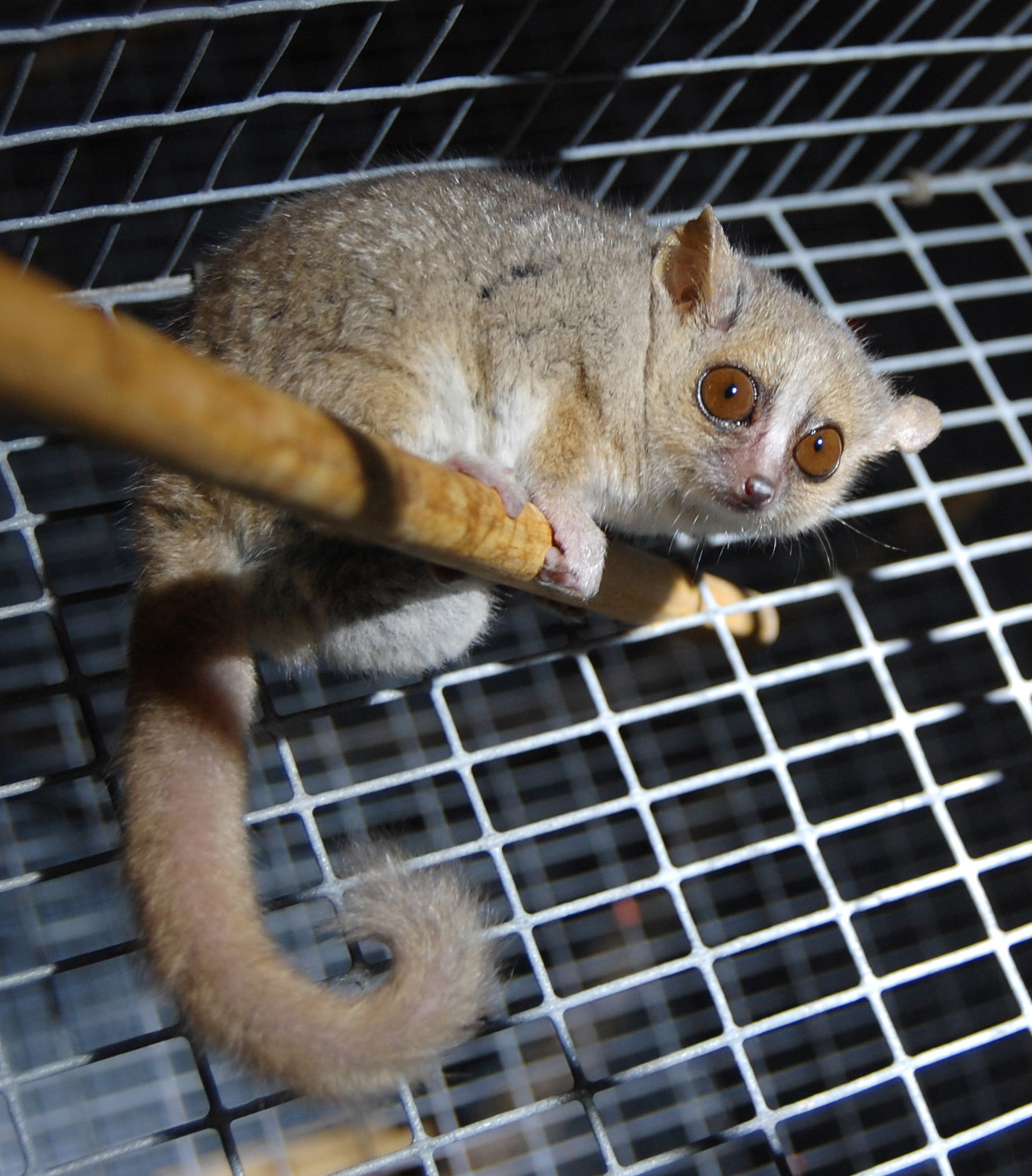
Gray mouse lemur

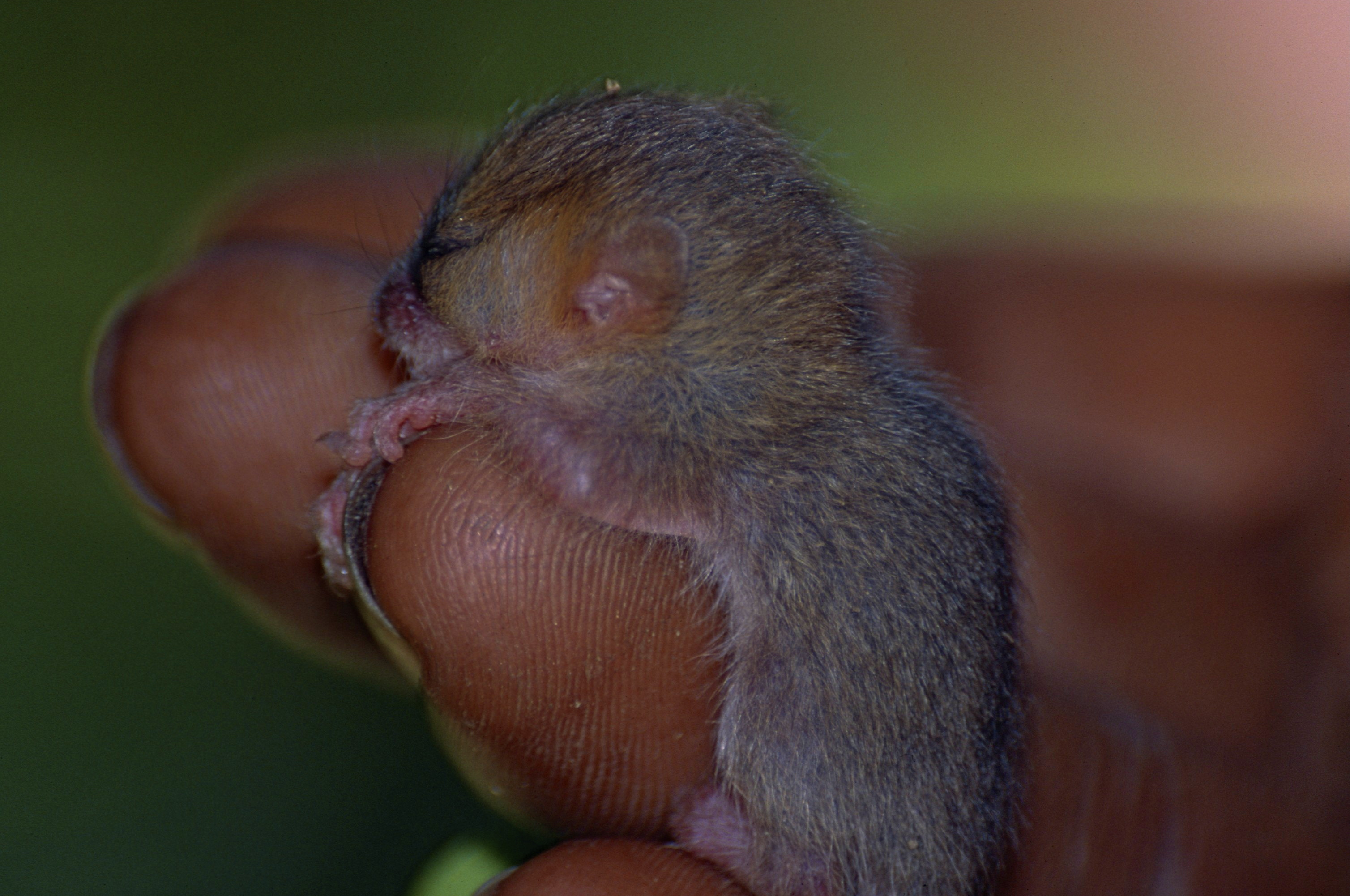
Baby brown mouse lemur

The golden-brown mouse lemur (Microcebus ravelobensis), also known as the (Lac) Ravelobe mouse lemur, is part of the Cheirogaleidae family, and the smallest species of lemur. It is arboreal, nocturnal and usually social. It get its name from the color of its body. Like several other mouse lemurs, like the brown mouse lemur (Microcebus rufus), it is a small primate that has a brown dorsal side and a whitish-grey for its ventral side of the body. All lemurs live in Madagascar. This species was discovered in 1994.

== Geographic range and habitat ==
The island of Madagascar is located off the southeastern coast of Africa. All species of lemur are indigenous to the island. The Golden-brown mouse lemur is isolated in the forest reserve of Ankarafantsika National Park, a dry deciduous forest located in northwestern Madagascar. It shares the habitat with the gray mouse lemur (M. murinus), a sympatric species. Within the habitat that which both the golden-brown lemur and gray mouse lemur live, they occupy two very different niches showing divergent regional distribution and different population density patterns. The golden-brown mouse lemur prefers habitat areas in lower latitudes that are humid and in close proximity to water resources. Whereas the gray mouse lemur populations increase with altitude and are located in drier habitats away from water sources.

M. ravelobensis, as well as other species of mouse lemur have been classified as leaf or nest builders. The golden-brown mouse lemur's habitat is well dispersed among sexes and family groups, showing little sign of intra- or interspecific competition among overlapping territories. In a 2009 study by S. Thoren et al. showed only lactating females were seen building nests, but studies suggest non-lactating females will also. Nest building will take place in the early hours of the night and will take approximately 60 minutes to build. The nests are constructed of small branches and leaves from surrounding vegetation. They will be occupied by lactating or dominant females, their offspring and mixed lineage group members for a period of 36 days.

== Feeding ==
The golden-brown mouse lemurs are nocturnal creatures, which means they sleep during the day and search for food at night. According to National Geographic, golden-brown mouse lemurs consume "insects, fruit, flowers, and other plants." They are known to be mostly frugivorous primates (primarily fruit-eating), but they can be omnivorous as well. The brown mouse lemur is able to store "thirty-five percent of their body weight" in the form of fat. This fat is stored in the lemur's hind legs and tail and is used for energy when food sources are scarce.

== Anatomy and physiology ==
The golden-brown mouse lemur has been categorized as a separate species based on morphology and genetics. Its dorsal side is golden-brown, and yellowish-white ventrally. It has a white stripe running from the lower forehead to the muzzle. It weighs 40–70 g (1.4–2.5 oz) depending on the season, and is similar in appearance to the gray mouse lemur, though it has a longer, thinner tail. It is unable to store fat in its tail like other mouse lemurs. It travels through the forest by leaping, unlike the gray mouse lemur. It is a nocturnal species, and builds its nests in dense patches of vines or dead leaves.

== Sexual reproduction ==
According to Matthew Esser, "Sexual maturity is reached after one year of age." The brown mouse lemur also has an established mating ritual. A male will use "soft squeak calls and tail-lashing" to signal the female. The female shows that she is willing to mate by "ano-genital rubbing and mouth wiping." When the mating has ended, the female will making a threatening sound. Some of the males who are more dominant will have multiple mates. "Brown mouse lemurs mate between September and October." The offspring are usually born between November and December. There are usually one to three young for each litter; females are capable of having one to two litters each year. In the winter months following their birth, the males of the species leave the areas where they were born.

== Social distribution ==
There is a great variation in social patterns among nocturnal lemurs; the golden-brown mouse lemur is exceptional with its mixed-sex sleeping groups. M. ravelobensis has a well dispersed, inter-sexual sleeping pattern that promotes promiscuity was first categorized in 2004 by researchers Weidt, et al. The golden-brown mouse lemur sleeps predominantly in tree branches or makes nests. Because of this exposed environment male/female sleeping groups exist to aid in both thermoregulation of nests and decrease the chances of predation. This observation has also been noted by Radespiel et al. (2003). Within the sleeping groups, there are several nest locations that individuals will switch between, but the members within the community never change. This social spatial distribution leads to overlapping territories that develop a multi-family community within a given range. Within this given range, studies show little or no competition between males during mating season . Though golden-brown mouse lemurs exhibit a social sleeping pattern, their active nocturnal lifestyle is typically solitary.

== Anthropogenic threats ==
M. ravelobensis appears to be affected by deforestation as it has led to an edge effect which has shown to have increased by body mass of females in edge habitats. Although deforestation seems to benefit the species in one specific location, the overall effects of deforestation lead to disruption in biodiversity, population density and dispersal and decreased genetic diversity. IUCN red list website states that, "The principal threat to this species is habitat loss due to slash-and-burn agriculture." They are also threatened by natural predators in their habitat. Some of the well-known predators are "fossa (Cryptoprocta ferox), ring tailed mongoose (Galidia elegans), owls (Strigiformes), and Madagascar harrier hawk (Polyboroides radiatus)." Some say that brown mouse lemurs could be influential in spreading the seeds of plants and fruits they eat. As a result of deforestation they are at risk of extinction according to the Convention on International Trade in Endangered Species (CITES).
