= German Primate Centre =

Primate research institute in Germany

- Deutsches Primatenzentrum
- Abbreviation: DPZ
- Established: 1977; 49 years ago
- Type: Non-profit
- Purpose: primate research
- Location: Göttingen, Germany
- Coordinates: 51°33′42.23″N 9°57′16.74″E
- Fields: biological and biomedical research
- Affiliations: Gottfried Wilhelm Leibniz Scientific Community
- Budget: €15 million
- Funding: Federal and state governments of Germany, grants

The German Primate Centre (German: Deutsches Primatenzentrum, DPZ), founded in 1977, is a non-profit independent research and service institute located in Göttingen, Lower Saxony. It is a member of the Gottfried Wilhelm Leibniz Scientific Community, and funded by the federal government and by the states of Germany. In addition, about 40% of the total budget of €15 million comes from grants.

The functions and services of the DPZ concentrate on biological and biomedical research on and with primates, and include the study and maintenance of free ranging primate populations and improvements in husbandry of primates in human care.

The DPZ's mission is to serve as a centre of excellence for research with primates, and as a service and competence centre for those institutions in Germany and abroad that house primates and / or do primate-related research (e.g. academic laboratories and zoological gardens). The centre is organised in three sections: Organismic Primate Biology, Neurosciences, and Infection Research.

The DPZ is closely cooperating with the University of Göttingen and the local Max-Planck Institutes. Heads of departments hold professorship at the University of Göttingen or at the Faculty of Veterinary Medicine in Hanover.

Currently, about 1400 monkeys from nine species (including rhesuses, ring-tailed lemurs, common marmosets, olive baboons, macaques), live in the primate husbandry of the DPZ. Part of them are needed for research at the DPZ or provided to other publicly funded scientific institutes. Apart from research, the centre offers examinations and treatments of primates as a service for scientists, institutions, companies, and zoos.
