= List of Malagasy mammal common names =

The following list of Malagasy mammal names, compiled and edited by Blench & Walsh (2009), are from Garbutt (1999) unless noted otherwise. The other sources are Beaujard (1998), Goodman & Benstead (2003), Gueunier (1987), and Richardson (1885).

== Bats ==
Malagasy name	Scientific name	English name
andrehy	Eidolon dupreanum	Madagascar straw-coloured fruit bat
angavo, angavy	Eidolon dupreanum	Madagascar straw-coloured fruit bat
fanihy	Eidolon dupreanum	Madagascar straw-coloured fruit bat
fanihy vato	Eidolon dupreanum	Madagascar straw-coloured fruit bat
andrehy	Pteropodidae	fruit bats
angavo, angavy	Pteropodidae	fruit bats
fanihy	Pteropodidae	fruit bats
andrehy	Pteropus rufus	Madagascar flying fox
fanihy	Pteropus rufus	Madagascar flying fox
fanihy be	Pteropus rufus	Madagascar flying fox
fanihy mena	Pteropus rufus	Madagascar flying fox
andrehy	Rousettus madagascariensis	Madagascar rousette
fanihy vato	Rousettus madagascariensis	Madagascar rousette
manavy		generic name for bats

== Feliforms ==
Malagasy name	Scientific name	English name
amboa laolo	Eupleres goudotii	Falanouc
falanouc	Eupleres goudotii	Falanouc
fanaloka	Fossa fossana	Fanaloka; Malagasy striped civet
fanaloka	Fossa fossana	Fanaloka; Malagasy striped civet
tambo tsodina tambo sadina	Fossa fossana	Fanaloka; Malagasy striped civet
kokia	Galidia elegans	Ring-tailed mongoose
vontsira	Galidia elegans	Ring-tailed mongoose
vontsira mena	Galidia elegans	Ring-tailed mongoose
vontsira fotsy	Galidictis fasciata	Broad-striped mongoose
bokiboki	Mungotictis decemlineata	Narrow-striped mongoose
tera boky	Mungotictis decemlineata	Narrow-striped mongoose
salano	Salanoia concolor	Brown-tailed mongoose
jabady, jaboady zaboady	Viverricula indica	Small Indian civet
fòsa vàrika		Fossa sp.
rangòka		Fossa sp.

== Bushpigs ==
Malagasy name	Scientific name	English name
antsanga	Potamochoerus larvatus	Bushpig
lambo	Potamochoerus larvatus	Bushpig
lambo ala	Potamochoerus larvatus	Bushpig
lambo dia	Potamochoerus larvatus	Bushpig
lambonava	Potamochoerus larvatus	highland variety of bushpig
lamboniva	Potamochoerus larvatus	lowland variety of bushpig

== Tenrecs ==
Malagasy name	Scientific name	English name
tambo triky tambo trika	Echinops telfairi	Lesser hedgehog tenrec
tanibodrika	Echinops telfairi	Lesser hedgehog tenrec
sora, tsora	Hemicentetes nigriceps	Highland streaked tenrec
sora, tsora	Hemicentetes semispinosus	Lowland streaked tenrec
sora, tsora	Hemicentetes spp.	Streaked tenrecs
voalavo ndrano	Limnogale mergulus	Aquatic tenrec
fori menjy	Microgale spp.	shrew tenrecs
antsangy	Oryzorictes spp.	rice tenrecs
voalavo narabo	Oryzorictes spp.	rice tenrecs
soky, sokina, sokinana	Setifer setosus	Greater hedgehog tenrec
sora, tsora	Setifer setosus	Greater hedgehog tenrec
kelora	Tenrec ecaudatus	Common tenrec
tandraka, trandraka tandeke	Tenrec ecaudatus	Common tenrec

== Shrews ==
Malagasy name	Scientific name	English name
voalavo fotsy	Suncus etruscus	Pygmy musk shrew
voalavo fotsy	Suncus murinus	House shrew
voalavo narabo	Suncus murinus	House shrew

== Rodents ==
Malagasy name	Scientific name	English name
votsitse, votsotsa, votsotse	Hypogeomys antimena	Malagasy giant jumping rat
kely botra	Macrotarsomys bastardi	Western forest mouse
voalavo, valàvo valave	Macrotarsomys bastardi	Western forest mouse
totozy totozo	Mus musculus	House mouse
voalavo mena	Nesomys spp.	Red forest rats
voalavo, valàvo valave	Rattus norvegicus	Brown rat
voalavo, valàvo valave	Rattus rattus	Black rat
voalavo, valàvo valave		rat spp.

== Primates ==
Malagasy name	Scientific name	English name
tsidy ala	Allocebus trichotis	Hairy-eared dwarf lemur
ampongy	Avahi laniger	Eastern avahi
fotsifaka	Avahi laniger	Eastern avahi
fotsife	Avahi laniger	Eastern avahi
fotsife	Avahi occidentalis	Western avahi
tsara fangitra	Avahi occidentalis	Western avahi
avahy	Avahi spp.	Woolly lemurs
antsangy	Brachytarsomys spp.	White-tailed tree rats
hataka	Cheirogaleus major	Greater dwarf lemur
tsidy, tsidihy, tsitsihy tsidika	Cheirogaleus major	Greater dwarf lemur
kely be-ohy	Cheirogaleus medius	Fat-tailed dwarf lemur
matavirambo	Cheirogaleus medius	Fat-tailed dwarf lemur
tsidy, tsidihy, tsitsihy tsidika	Cheirogaleus medius	Fat-tailed dwarf lemur
fosa	Cryptoprocta ferox	Fossa
ahayaiay, haihay	Daubentonia madagascariensis	Aye-aye
ankomba, komba	Eulemur coronatus	Crowned lemur
gidro	Eulemur coronatus	Crowned lemur
ankomba, komba	Eulemur fulvus	Common brown lemur
varika	Eulemur fulvus albifrons	White-fronted brown lemur
varika	Eulemur fulvus albocollaris	White-collared brown lemur
varika	Eulemur fulvus collaris	Collared brown lemur
varikosy	Eulemur fulvus fulvus	Common brown lemur
dredrika	Eulemur fulvus fulvus	Common brown lemur
varika	Eulemur fulvus fulvus	Common brown lemur
vàrikàla	Eulemur fulvus rufus	Red-fronted brown lemur
beharavoaka	Eulemur fulvus sanfordi	Sanford's brown lemur
ankomba joby	Eulemur macaco flavifrons	Blue-eyed black lemur (male)
ankomba mena	Eulemur macaco flavifrons	Blue-eyed black lemur (female)
ankomba, komba	Eulemur macaco macaco	Black lemur
dredrika	Eulemur mongoz	Mongoose lemur
gidro	Eulemur mongoz	Crowned lemur
soamiera soamira	Eulemur rubriventer	Red-bellied lemur
tongona	Eulemur rubriventer	Red-bellied lemur
vari maso	Eulemur rubriventer	Red-bellied lemur
ankomba, komba	Eulemur sanfordi	Sanford's brown lemur
bokombolo mena	Hapalemur aureus	Golden bamboo lemur
vari bolo mena	Hapalemur aureus	Golden bamboo lemur
kotrika	Hapalemur griseus griseus	Eastern grey bamboo lemur
vari bolo	Hapalemur griseus	Grey bamboo lemur
bandro	Hapalemur griseus alaotrensis	Alaotra reed lemur
alokoteha	Hapalemur griseus griseus	Eastern lesser bamboo lemur; Grey gentle lemur
bokombolo bokombola	Hapalemur griseus griseus	Eastern grey bamboo lemur
bokombolo bokombola	Hapalemur griseus griseus	Eastern lesser bamboo lemur; Grey gentle lemur
halo halobe	Hapalemur griseus meridionalis	Southern lesser bamboo lemur; Southern gentle lemur
ankomba valiha	Hapalemur griseus occidentalis	Western lesser bamboo lemur; Western gentle lemur
bekola	Hapalemur griseus occidentalis	Western lesser bamboo lemur; Western gentle lemur
bokombolo bokombola	Hapalemur griseus occidentalis	Western grey bamboo lemur
kintrontro	Hapalemur griseus occidentalis	Western lesser bamboo lemur; Western gentle lemur
vari bolo	Hapalemur simus	Greater bamboo lemur
amboa nala	Indri indri	Indri; generic name for lemurs
babakoto	Indri indri	Indri
endrina	Indri indri	Indri
hira	Lemur catta	Ring-tailed lemur
maki, maky	Lemur catta	Ring-tailed lemur
fitily, fitiliky, fitsidiky	Lepilemur dorsalis	Grey-backed sportive lemur
boenga, boengy	Lepilemur edwardsi	Milne-Edwards' sportive lemur
repahaka	Lepilemur edwardsi	Milne-Edwards' sportive lemur
songiky	Lepilemur leucopus	White-footed sportive lemur
fitily, fitiliky, fitsidiky	Lepilemur microdon	Small-toothed sportive lemur
hataka	Lepilemur microdon	Small-toothed sportive lemur
kotrika	Lepilemur microdon	Small-toothed sportive lemur
tranga lavaka	Lepilemur microdon	Small-toothed sportive lemur
varikosy	Lepilemur microdon	Small-toothed sportive lemur
hataka	Lepilemur mustelinus	Weasel sportive lemur
kotrika	Lepilemur mustelinus	Weasel sportive lemur
tranga lavaka	Lepilemur mustelinus	Weasel sportive lemur
varikosy	Lepilemur mustelinus	Weasel sportive lemur
boenga, boengy	Lepilemur ruficaudatus	Red-tailed sportive lemur
mahy abe ala	Lepilemur septentrionalis	Northern sportive lemur
songiky	Lepilemur septentrionalis	Northern sportive lemur
pondiky	Microcebus murinus	Grey mouse lemur
tilitili vaha	Microcebus murinus	Grey mouse lemur
tsidy, tsidihy, tsitsihy tsidika	Microcebus murinus	Grey mouse lemur
vaki handry, vaki andri	Microcebus murinus	Grey mouse lemur
tsidy, tsidihy, tsitsihy tsidika	Microcebus rufus	Brown mouse lemur
tsidy savoka	Microcebus rufus	Brown mouse lemur
tsidy, tsidihy, tsitsihy tsidika	Microcebus spp.	Dwarf lemurs
fitily, fitiliky, fitsidiky	Mirza coquereli	Coquerel's dwarf lemur
setohy	Mirza coquereli	Coquerel's dwarf lemur
tilitili vaha	Mirza coquereli	Coquerel's dwarf lemur
tsiba, siba	Mirza coquereli	Coquerel's dwarf lemur
tanta (raolana) tantana, tantaroalela	Phaner furcifer	Fork-marked lemur
vaki handry, vaki andri	Phaner furcifer	Fork-marked lemur
tanta (raolana) tantana, tantaroalela	Phaner furcifer electromontis	Amber Mountain fork-marked lemur
tanta (raolana) tantana, tantaroalela	Phaner furcifer furcifer	Eastern fork-marked lemur
tanta (raolana) tantana, tantaroalela	Phaner furcifer pallescens	Pale fork-marked lemur
vaki voho	Phaner furcifer pallescens	Pale fork-marked lemur
tanta (raolana) tantana, tantaroalela	Phaner furcifer parienti	Pariente's fork-marked lemur
tanta (raolana) tantana, tantaroalela	Phaner spp.	Fork-marked lemurs
simpona, simpony	Propithecus diadema candidus	Silky sifaka
simpona, simpony	Propithecus diadema diadema	Diademed sifaka
simpona, simpony	Propithecus diadema edwardsi	Milne-Edwards' sifaka
ankomba joby	Propithecus diadema perrieri	Perrier's sifaka
radjako, rajako, jakoe, jakoey	Propithecus diadema perrieri	Perrier's sifaka
ankomba malandy	Propithecus tattersalli	Tattersall's sifaka
simpona, simpony	Propithecus tattersalli	Tattersall's sifaka
sifaka	Propithecus verreauxi coquereli	Coquerel's sifaka
tsiba haka	Propithecus verreauxi coquereli	Coquerel's sifaka
sifaka	Propithecus verreauxi coronatus	Crowned sifaka
tsiba haka	Propithecus verreauxi coronatus	Crowned sifaka
sifaka	Propithecus verreauxi deckeni	Decken's sifaka
tsiba haka	Propithecus verreauxi deckeni	Decken's sifaka
sifaka	Propithecus verreauxi verreauxi	Verreaux's sifaka
sifaka avahi	Propithecus verreauxi verreauxi	Verreaux's sifaka (dark variant)
sifaka bilany	Propithecus verreauxi verreauxi	Verreaux's sifaka (Isalo area)
sifakely	Propithecus sp.	Sifaka sp., small in size
sifaka	Propithecus spp.	Sifaka spp.
simpona, simpony	Propithecus spp.	Sifaka spp.
vari mena	Varecia variegata rubra	Red ruffed lemur
vari	Varecia variegata variegata	Black-and-white ruffed lemur
varikandra, varikandana varianda	Varecia variegata variegata	Black-and-white ruffed lemur
vàri zàtsy, vari jatsy	Varecia variegata variegata	Black-and-white ruffed lemur
vàri kotrèka		lemur sp., small, grey
tsidy, tsidihy, tsitsihy tsidika		lemur sp., small, yellowish
vaki		lemur spp.
varika		lemur spp.
halokotehina		unidentified lemur sp., small in size
tsidikinizozoro		unidentified sp.

== See also ==
- List of mammals of Madagascar
- Fauna of Madagascar
