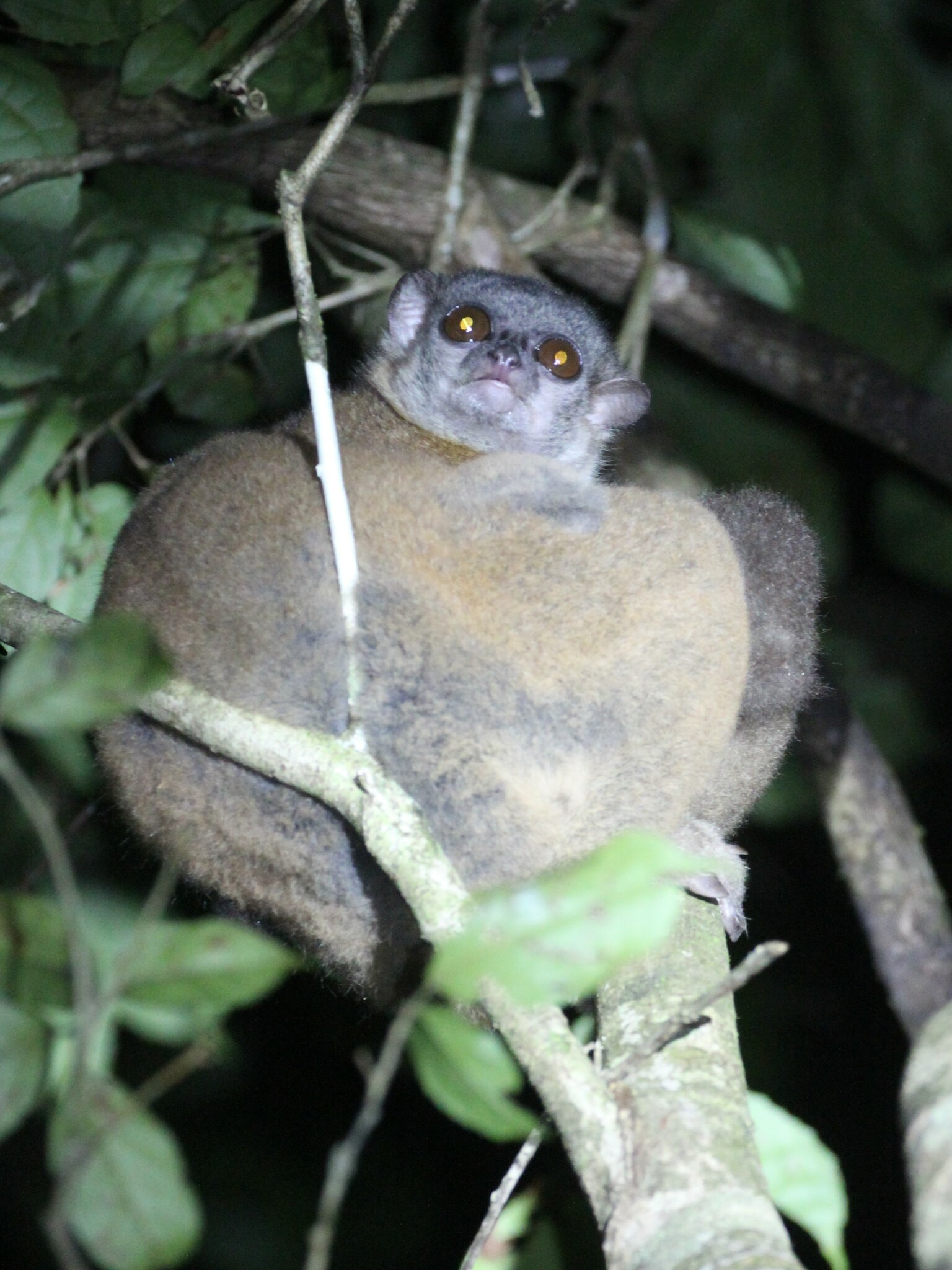

Conservation status
- Vulnerable (IUCN 3.1)
- CITES Appendix I

Scientific classification
- Kingdom: Animalia
- Phylum: Chordata
- Class: Mammalia
- Order: Primates
- Suborder: Strepsirrhini
- Family: Lepilemuridae
- Genus: Lepilemur
- Species: L. seali

Binomial name
- Lepilemur seali Louis et al.., 2006
- Distribution for L. seali

= Seal's sportive lemur =

Species of lemur

Seal's sportive lemur (Lepilemur seali), or the Anjanaharibe-Sud sportive lemur, is a sportive lemur endemic to Madagascar. Previous to a 2006 genetic analysis showing the species to be distinct, it was thought to be a population of weasel sportive lemur (Lepilemur mustelinus). Like all members of its genus, it is nocturnal and largely folivorous. It is threatened by habitat loss, hunting, and climate change.

== Evolution ==
Seal's sportive lemur is a sister species to Holland's sportive lemur (Lepilemur hollandorum), having diverged approximately 2.1 million years ago. These two species further fall into a northeastern Lepilemur clade with Scott's sportive lemur (Lepilemur scottorum) that originated approximately 2.68 million years ago.

== Description ==
Seal's sportive lemur has long, thick fur that is uniformly light chocolate-brown to reddish-brown above and lighter brownish grey below with cream-tipped hairs on the sides of the belly. The face is light brownish grey, with a yellow to white collar on the neck. The hands and feet are light, greyish brown. The tail is brownish grey, and sometimes possesses white-tipped hairs. It is a medium-sized Lepilemur, with a total length of 53 cm (21 in), of which 27 cm (11 in) is the body and 26 cm (10 in) is the tail. It weighs approximately 950 g (34 oz).

== Distribution and habitat ==
Seal's sportive lemur is found in northeastern Madagascar, where it is known at least as far south as the Fananehana River and no farther north than the Bernarivo River. However, the exact boundaries of the species' range are not clear. Within its distribution, Seal's Sportive Lemur occupies mid to high altitude humid rainforests, preferring undisturbed low-canopy forests that have good availability of sleeping holes in old trees.

== Threats and conservation ==
The main threats facing Seal's sportive lemur are habitat loss, hunting and climate change. The rainforests in which the species inhabit are under direct threat due to forest clearing for shifting agriculture. Additionally, hunting of the species is unsustainable, with local households on average hunting 0.15 Seal's sportive lemurs per year, among 1,155 households in the surveyed region. The species' distribution is also expected to shrink by 8% by 2080 due to climate change alone.

Seal's sportive lemur occurs in some protected areas such as the Anjanaharibe-Sud Special Reserve and Makira Natural Park.
