= Wright's sportive lemur =

Conservation status
- Endangered (IUCN 3.1)
- CITES Appendix I

Scientific classification
- Kingdom: Animalia
- Phylum: Chordata
- Class: Mammalia
- Order: Primates
- Suborder: Strepsirrhini
- Family: Lepilemuridae
- Genus: Lepilemur
- Species: L. wrighti

Binomial name
- Lepilemur wrighti Louis et al.., 2006
- Distribution of L. wrighti

Synonyms
- L. wrightae

Species of lemur

Wright's sportive lemur (Lepilemur wrighti), or the Kalambatritra sportive lemur, is a sportive lemur endemic to Madagascar. Like all members of its genus, it is nocturnal and largely folivorous. Unlike all other members of Lepilemur, it displays visible sexual dimorphism. It is threatened by habitat loss.

== Taxonomy and phylogenetics ==
Wright's sportive lemur was described in 2006 based on genetic samples and morphometrics collected in 2003 and 2004 as Lepilemur wrighti. The name was presumed to be incorrectly formed and was corrected in 2009 to Lepilemur wrightae. However, this change was deemed to be an unjustified emendation. The specific epithet wrighti honors the conservationist and primatologist Patricia Wright.

Genetic analyses show Wright's sportive lemur to be an outgroup to a clade of eastern Lepilemur containing Fleurete's sportive lemur, the Betsileo sportive lemur, James' sportive lemur, and the weasel sportive lemur.

== Description ==
Wright's sportive lemur displays sexually dimorphic coloration, unique among members of Lepilemur. Both sexes have a diffuse, reddish-brown and gray back with a lighter grayish-brown underside. The female displays a sharply contrasting, uniformly gray head, whereas the male's head is similar in coloration to the rest of the upper body. Some females may possess a slight color change around the face that forms a mask-like appearance. The ears in both sexes show minimal furring and are pale.

Wright's sportive lemur is relatively large for its genus. The head-body length is 24–26 cm (9.4–10.2 in) and the tail length is 25–26 cm (9.8–10.2 in), making the total length 49–52 cm (19–20 in). It weighs 950–1,100 g (34–39 oz).

== Distribution and habitat ==
Wright's sportive lemur is found in southeastern Madagascar, where it is only known from Kalambatritra Special Reserve and the unprotected Beakora Forest. Its population density has been estimated to be 18.52-72 individuals/km^{2} in Kalambatritra and 6 individuals/km^{2} in Beakora. Additionally, its estimated extent of occurrence is 874 km^{2}.

Within its range, Wright's sportive lemur inhabits mid-altitude rainforest. Like other species of Lepilemur, sleeping sites are holes in large trees. Groups of one to three individuals have been seen foraging together, and the species is known to defecate in communal latrines.

== Threats and conservation ==
Wright's sportive lemur was listed as an endangered species by the IUCN in 2020 due to ongoing habitat loss. Factors causing and contributing to the species' decline include wildfires lit by humans to clear areas for cattle grazing and illegal activities such as marijuana cultivation and cattle rustling. As of 2022, the species was not being held in captivity.
