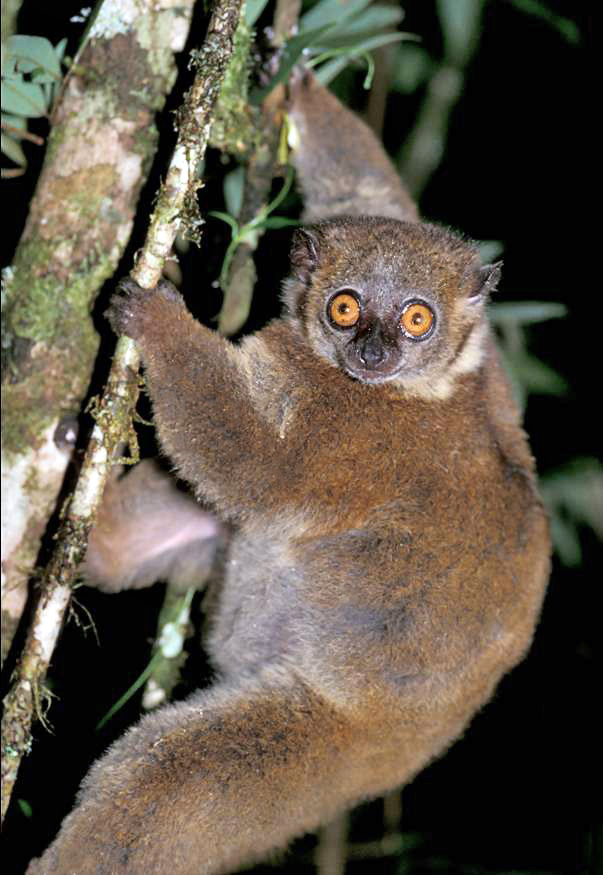

Conservation status
- Endangered (IUCN 3.1)
- CITES Appendix I

Scientific classification
- Kingdom: Animalia
- Phylum: Chordata
- Class: Mammalia
- Infraclass: Placentalia
- Order: Primates
- Suborder: Strepsirrhini
- Family: Lepilemuridae
- Genus: Lepilemur
- Species: L. microdon

Binomial name
- Lepilemur microdon Forsyth Major, 1894
- Distribution of Lepilemur microdon

= Small-toothed sportive lemur =

Species of primate from Madagascar

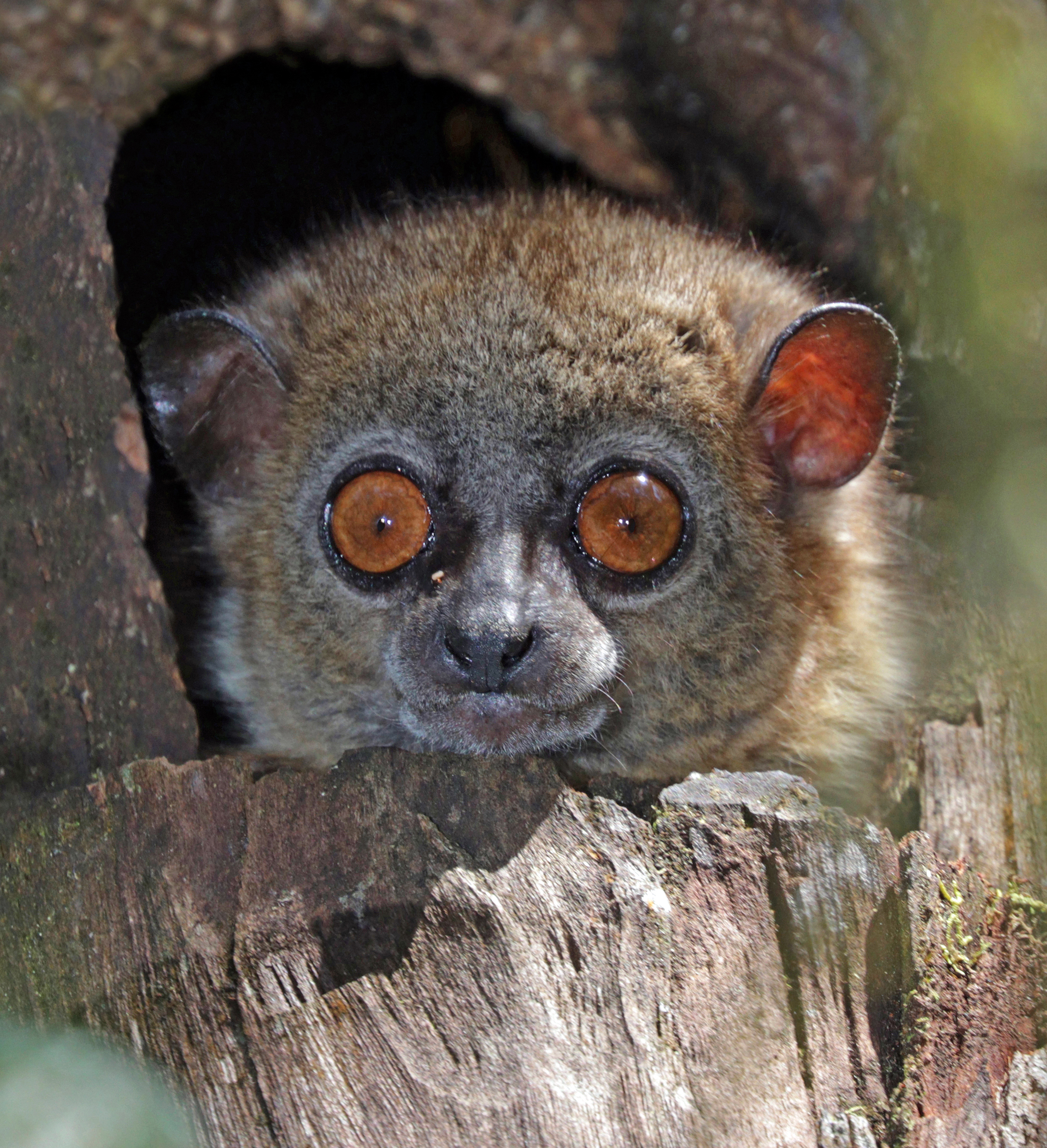
Ranomafana National Park

The small-toothed sportive lemur (Lepilemur microdon), or small-toothed weasel lemur, is a primate species in the family Lepilemuridae that—like all extant lemurs—is endemic to Madagascar. The species lives in dense rainforest in southeastern Madagascar, and can be found in Ranomafana and Andringitra National Parks. Described in 1894, it was considered either a subspecies or taxonomic synonym of the weasel sportive lemur (Lepilemur mustelinus) throughout most of the 20th century. Phylogenetic studies not only support its species status, but also suggest that it is the only eastern Malagasy sportive lemur that is more closely related to western than to other eastern species.

According to the original description, some of its teeth are smaller than those in other sportive lemurs. It is relatively large for a sportive lemur, and is difficult to visually distinguish from the weasel sportive lemur. The species weighs between 0.9 and 1.2 kg (2.0 and 2.6 lb) and measures 55 to 64 cm (22 to 25 in) from head to tail. Its fur is mostly reddish-brown or chestnut color, with a dark stripe running from its head down its back. Its underside and neck are lighter in color. Like other sportive lemurs, it is nocturnal, sleeping in concealed tangles of vegetation as well as tree holes. The small-toothed sportive lemur is solitary and eats leaves, fruits, and flowers.

Due to recent taxonomic changes and a lack of clarity about its population size and range, it was listed as "data deficient" by the International Union for Conservation of Nature (IUCN) in 2008. This was changed to "endangered" in 2014, on the basis of a small, fragmented and shrinking range, as well as a declining population. It is also protected from international commercial trade under CITES Appendix I. Its primary threats are habitat loss to slash-and-burn agriculture and hunting.

== Taxonomy and phylogeny ==
- - - - Lepilemur section A
      - - L. microdon
        - Lepilemur section B
    - Lepilemur section C
  - Lepilemur section D

- - - Lepilemur section A
    - Lepilemur section B
    - - L. microdon
      - Lepilemur section C
  - Lepilemur section D

Phylogeny and relationships of L. microdon with its most closely related Lepilemur species based on mitochondrial DNA sequences from the PAST fragment (top) and D-loop (bottom).

The small-toothed sportive lemur or small-toothed weasel lemur, a member of the sportive lemur genus (Lepilemur), was first described in 1894 by Charles Immanuel Forsyth Major, based on a specimen found in the Ankafana Forest in the eastern districts of the former Betsileo province in central Madagascar. Although Forsyth Major did not explicitly state the origins of either the scientific name or the vernacular name, he did note that it had smaller molar teeth relative to other sportive lemurs. The species name microdon is derived from the Ancient Greek micro-, meaning "small" and -odon, meaning "tooth."

Until the 1990s, there was some dispute over the taxonomic status of the species. For much of the 20th century, the small-toothed sportive lemur was considered a subspecies of the weasel sportive lemur (Lepilemur mustelinus). In his book The Primates of Madagascar from 1982, primatologist Ian Tattersall deviated from the traditional view by considering L. microdon a synonym of the weasel sportive lemur, while also recognizing only a single species of sportive lemur. Tattersall based his decision on what he considered to be a lack of detailed anatomical studies and field surveys, while also factoring in the difficulty in observing the animals in the wild, the presence of only subtle variations among museum specimens, and his own unwillingness to consider differences in karyotypes as grounds for defining distinct species. However, primatologist Russell Mittermeier, et al. in Lemurs of Madagascar (1994), taxonomist Colin Groves in Mammal Species of the World (2005), and others favored recognizing the small-toothed sportive lemur as a species while also recognizing a total of seven sportive lemur species.

A cytogenetic (chromosome) study by Nicole Andriaholinirina, et al. published in 2005 added strong support to the species status of the small-toothed sportive lemur by demonstrating that its karyotype was distinct from all other sport lemur species. The species has 24 chromosomes (2n=24); the autosomal pairs (not sex chromosomes) include eight that are meta- or submetacentric (where chromosome arms are equal or unequal in length, respectively) and three smaller acrocentric pairs (with the shorter chromosome arm difficult to observe). Both the X and Y chromosomes are acrocentric. The study also showed that the small-toothed sportive lemur was the sportive lemur species most genetically distinct from the weasel sportive lemur, despite their similar appearance. A total of 18 chromosomal rearrangements distinguished the two species, indicating that if the two shared the same range, hybrids would be either completely sterile or suffer greatly reduced fertility.

In September 2006, Edward E. Louis Jr. et al. announced the discovery of 11 new species of sportive lemur based on mitochondrial DNA (mtDNA) data. Each new species resulted from the splitting of existing species. In the case of the small-toothed sportive lemur, the population at Kalambatritra Reserve became known as Wright's sportive lemur (Lepilemur wrightae), the population at Andohahela National Park became Fleurete's sportive lemur (L. fleuretae), the population in Fandriana became Betsileo sportive lemur (L. betsileo), and the population at Manombo Reserve became James' sportive lemur (L. jamesorum). The small-toothed sportive lemur remains a distinct species, while even more species have since been described, though none within its range.

Between 2006 and 2009, three studies were published to resolve the phylogenetic relationships between the sportive lemurs. Cytogenetic and molecular studies in 2006 and 2008 concluded that the small-toothed sportive lemur is most closely related to the Milne-Edwards' sportive lemur (Lepilemur edwardsi). In 2009, a study examined every known species, including the species most recently described, using two pieces of mtDNA: the D-loop and an array of genes known as the PAST fragment. The resulting data placed the sportive lemurs into four groups: Section A from northern and northwestern Madagascar, section B from northwestern Madagascar, section C from west central and southern Madagascar, and section D from eastern Madagascar. Only the small-toothed sportive lemur generated conflicting results when comparing the results between the mtDNA and D-loop data. The PAST data placed it in section B, while the D-loop data placed it in section C. The relationship between the small-toothed sportive lemur, an eastern Malagasy species, and a group of species from the west coast of Madagascar suggests that the ancestral population of the small-toothed sportive lemur dispersed to its current range from western Madagascar using river corridors. However, the conflicting data about the relationship of the small-toothed sportive lemur to either section B or section C render the precise dispersal route uncertain.

== Description ==
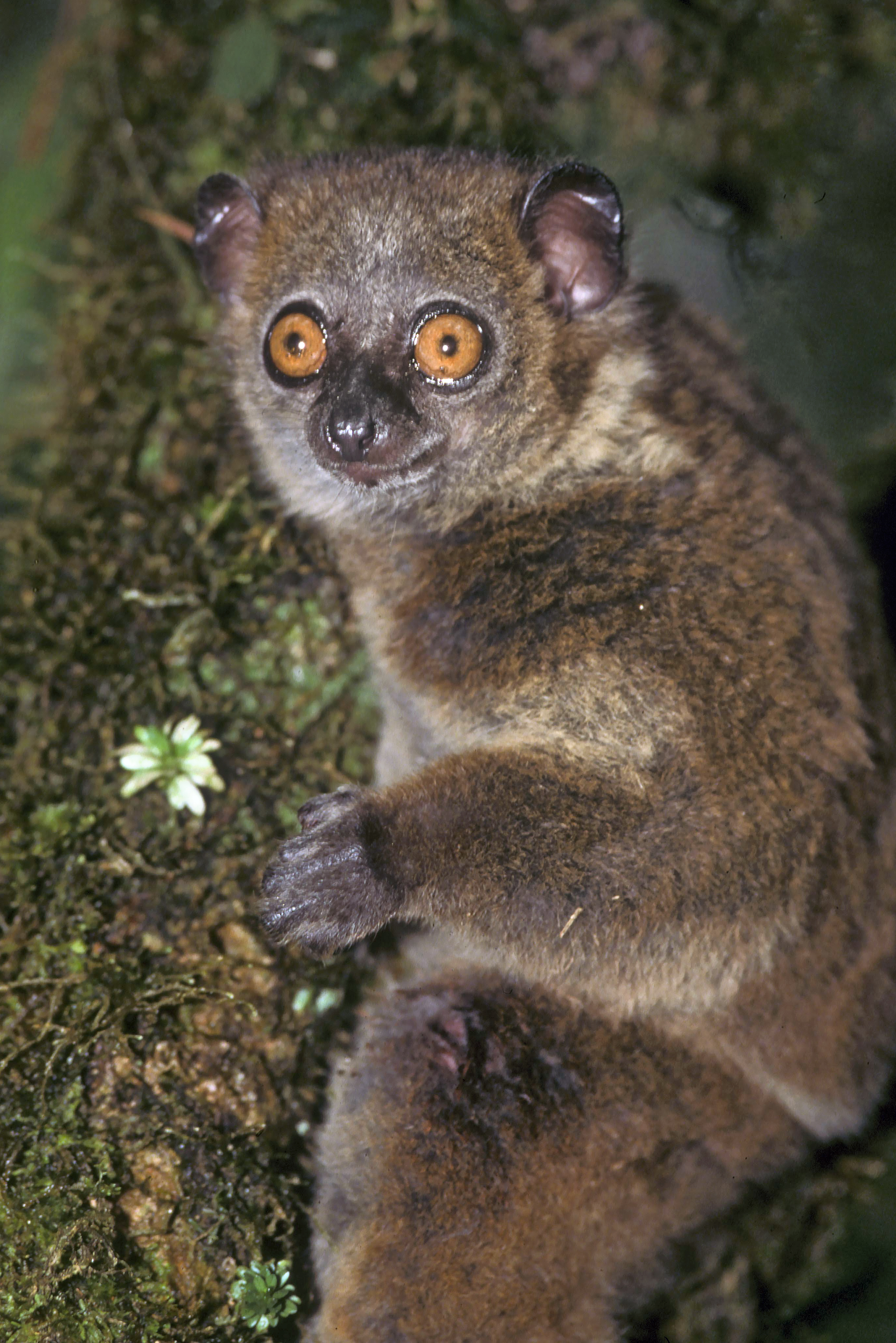
The small-toothed sportive lemur has reddish-brown fur and sometimes its underside has a yellowish hue.

Compared to other sportive lemurs, the small-toothed sportive lemur is relatively large, weighing between 0.9 and 1.2 kg (2.0 and 2.6 lb) and measuring 55 to 64 cm (22 to 25 in) from head to tail. Its head-body length is 27 to 32 cm (11 to 13 in), and its tail measures between 25 and 29 cm (9.8 and 11.4 in). The species is nearly identical in coloration to the weasel sportive lemur and it is almost impossible to separate the two in the field, except on the basis of geography. The small-toothed sportive lemur has a dark stripe in the center of its forehead that lightens as it runs down the back. Its pelage (fur) is thick and reddish-brown, while its underside and neck are pale gray-brown, and sometimes have a yellowish or yellowish-gray hue. The shoulders and forelimbs have a bright chestnut color. The color darkens to russet between the shoulders, down to the hind-limbs and tail. The tail is darkest at the tip. Some individuals are reported to have a characteristic collar of white fur.

Like all sportive lemurs, they can easily be confused with woolly lemurs (genus Avahi), and sometimes with the much smaller dwarf lemurs (genus Cheirogaleus). Unlike the woolly lemurs, sportive lemurs have prominent ears, and they lack the white patches usually found on the thighs of woolly lemurs. All sportive lemurs have long legs compared to their arms and trunk and the face is covered with short hairs.

According to a review by Henry Ogg Forbes in 1894, the species differs from other sportive lemurs—as its name suggests—by having significantly smaller molar teeth. Forbes also claimed that compared with the weasel sportive lemur, its bony palate is longer and it has a depression at the base of the nasal (nose) region. Like other sportive lemurs, the cecum (beginning of the large intestine) is enlarged, presumably to handle its leaf-rich diet, which is more characteristic of larger primates.

== Habitat and distribution ==
The small-toothed sportive lemur is found in inland southeastern Madagascar, ranging from Ranomafana National Park southwest to Andringitra National Park. The Namorona River acts as the northern border of its range, and the Manampatrana River may act as a southern border, where the species seems to be replaced by the James' sportive lemur. Further studies are needed to clarify its range and relationship with other sportive lemurs in southeastern Madagascar. The species inhabits dense rainforest.

A preliminary study at Ranomafana National Park in 1995 indicated the small-toothed sportive lemur may avoid competing with woolly lemurs for food (interspecific competition) by living in more disturbed areas of the park. Woolly lemur population density (and thus competition for food) appeared to affect the species distribution more than the availability of sleep sites.

== Behavior and ecology ==
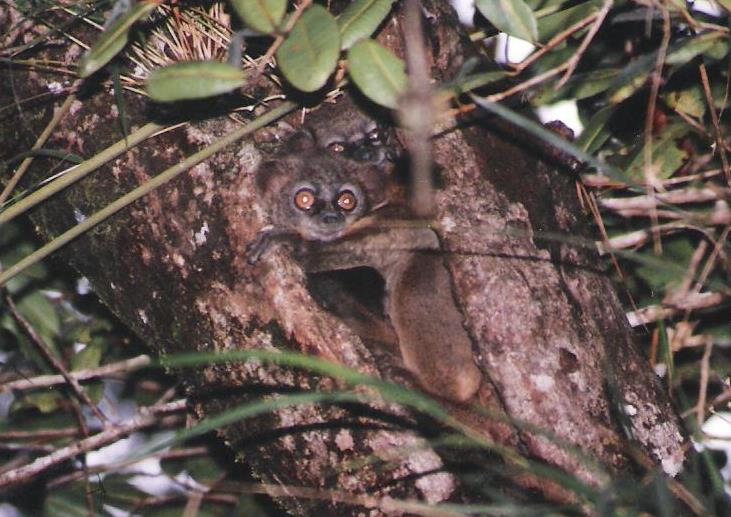
Small-toothed sportive lemurs, such as this mother and infant, sleep inside hollowed out trees.

Like all sportive lemurs, the small-toothed sportive lemur is nocturnal, sleeping in tree cavities or hidden tangles of vines and leaves during the day. The species is considered solitary, and like other rainforest-dwelling sportive lemurs, they vocalize significantly less than sportive lemurs that live in drier forests. Other similarities with the rest of the sportive lemur species include its diet of leaves, fruits, and flowers, its low resting metabolic rate, and its low activity rate.

In general, predators of sportive lemurs include diurnal birds of prey and carnivores, such as the fossa. The only recorded instance of predation on the small-toothed sportive lemur was by a Henst's goshawk (Accipiter henstii).

== Conservation ==
The small-toothed sportive lemur is listed under CITES Appendix I, which prohibits international commercial trade. The IUCN originally listed the species as "Lower Risk", first in 1996 under the sub-classification "least concern", and then in 2000 under the sub-classification "near threatened". Prior to the taxonomic changes that resulted in many new species of sportive lemur, the small-toothed sportive lemur was considered to have a widespread distribution, but its range is now thought to be more restricted. During its 2008 assessment, its population size, geographic range, and other factors were unclear, resulting in the classification "Data Deficient". In 2014, the IUCN found that the species merited "Endangered" status. The species range was estimated to be less than 1,140 km^{2} in area, as well as being severely fragmented and undergoing declines in extent and quality. The population was also found to be in decline. A population density of about 1.0 lemur/km^{2} was estimated.

Like many species of lemur, it is threatened with habitat loss from slash and burn agriculture and by increasing hunting pressure. It is hunted with spears and is also captured when trees with sleeping holes are cut down. The small-toothed sportive lemur is known to occur in both Ranomafana and Andringitra National Parks, although it may also be found in Midongy du sud National Park. However, this national park is at the extreme southern end of its geographic range, and the sportive lemurs there may actually represent a population of Fleurete's sportive lemur.

According to the International Species Information System (ISIS), no small-toothed sportive lemurs were maintained in captivity as of 2009.

== See also ==
- Evolutionary history of lemurs
