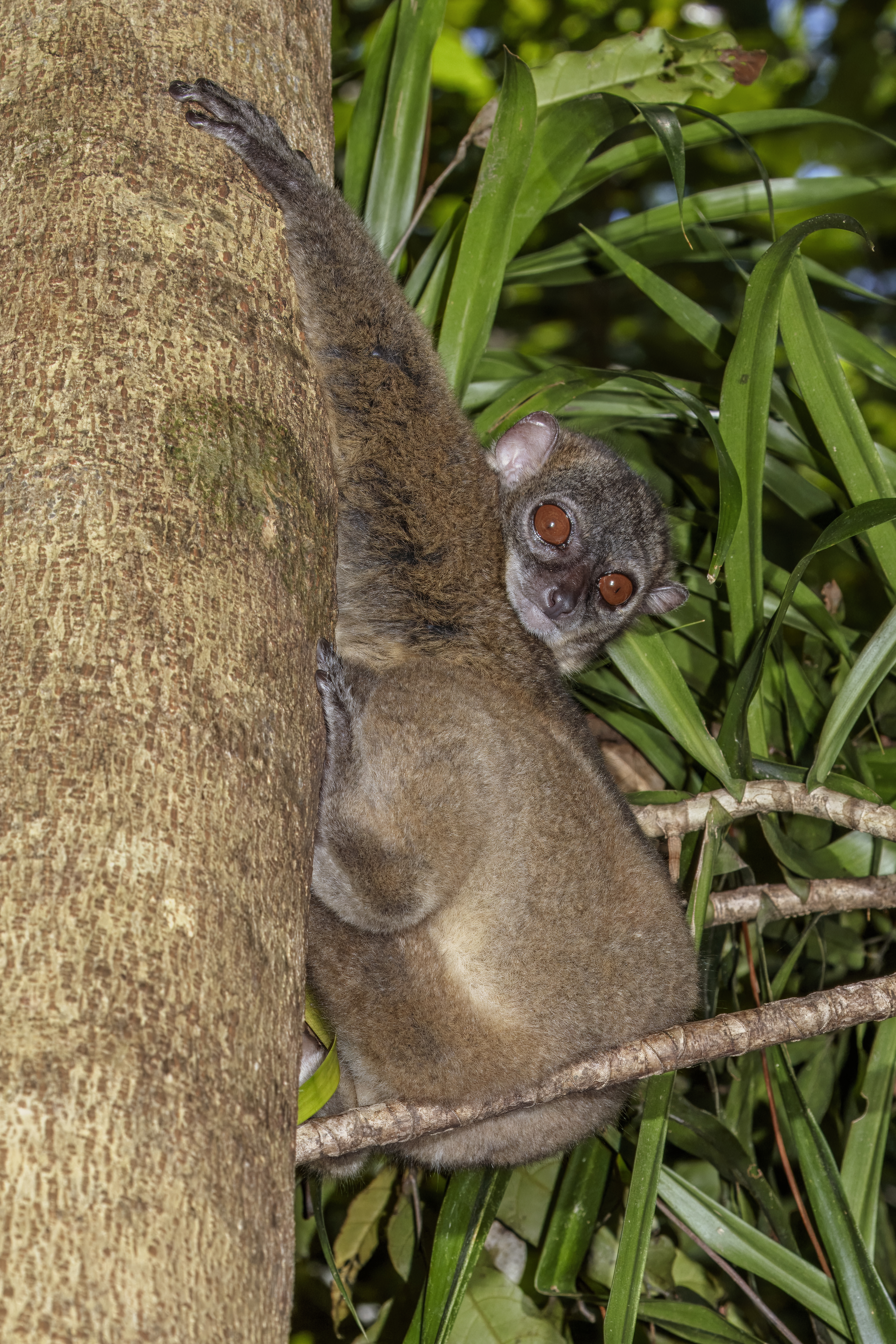
- in Lokobe Strict Reserve

Conservation status
- Critically Endangered (IUCN 3.1)
- CITES Appendix I

Scientific classification
- Kingdom: Animalia
- Phylum: Chordata
- Class: Mammalia
- Order: Primates
- Suborder: Strepsirrhini
- Family: Lepilemuridae
- Genus: Lepilemur
- Species: L. tymerlachsoni

Binomial name
- Lepilemur tymerlachsoni Louis et al., 2006
- Distribution for L. tymerlachsoni

= Hawks' sportive lemur =

Species of lemur

Hawks' sportive lemur (Lepilemur tymerlachsoni), also known as the Nosy Be sportive lemur or Nosy Be weasel lemur, is a sportive lemur endemic to Madagascar. Like all members of its genus, it is solitary, nocturnal and largely folivorous. It is threatened by habitat loss and unsustainable hunting.

== Taxonomy and phylogenetics ==
Hawks' sportive lemur was described in 2006 based on genetic samples and morphometrics collected in 2003 and 2004. The specific epithet tymerlachsoni honors the Howard and Rhonda Hawk family.

The name was corrected to L. tymerlachsonorum in 2009 under the incorrect assumption that the name was based on a husband and wife team. The original form is therefore considered the correct version.

Genetic analyses show Hawks' sportive lemur to be an outgroup to a clade containing the Ankarana sportive lemur and the Daraina sportive lemur.

== Description ==
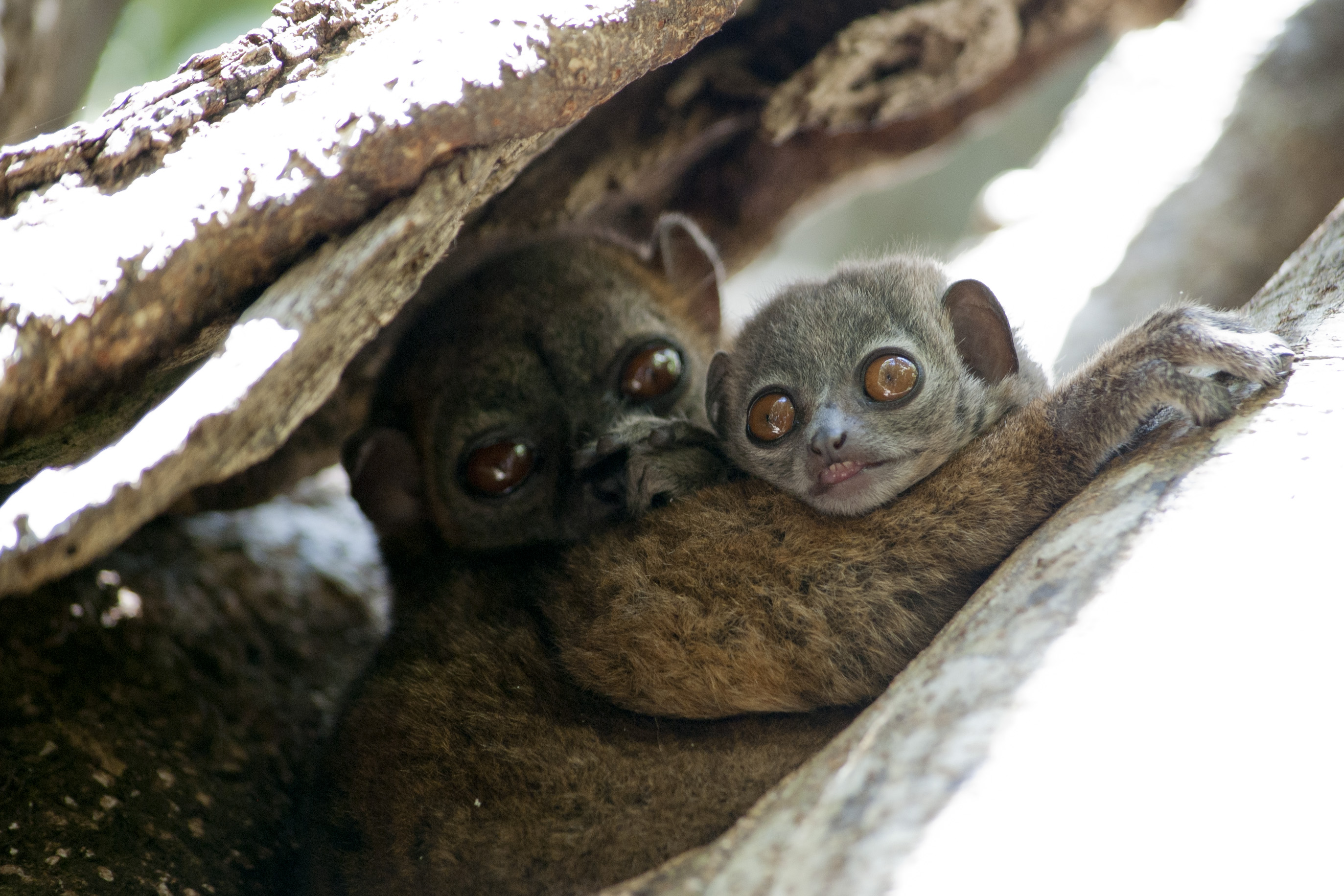

Hawks' sportive lemur is light brownish-gray with the upper half of the back a lighter reddish-brown. The underside is a light grayish-white. The outer side of the thighs and edges of the extremities also have a light reddish-brown color. A dark brown to black stripe is present from the head to the lower half of the back. The face is gray. The tail is a uniform light reddish-gray to brown.

It is a moderately large sportive lemur, with a total length of about 50 to 68 cm (20 to 27 in), of which 22 to 27 cm (8.7 to 10.6 in) is the tail.

== Distribution and habitat ==
Hawks' sportive lemur is endemic to Nosy Be island, Madagascar, where it is only known from Lokobe National Park and adjacent degraded forest. It is estimated to occupy an area of less than 72 km^{2} and occurs from 12-35 metres above sea level. Within Lokobe National Park, it has been recorded to achieve an average density of 63.2 individuals/km^{2}.

The main forest type within its range is lowland rain forest, although the region experiences a distinct dry season.

Selection of daytime sleeping spots change according to habitat type, with individuals favoring tree holes in dense primary forest and dense vegetation tangles in more open deciduous forest.

== Threats and conservation ==
Hawks' sportive lemur is threatened by forest degradation and clearing for agriculture and timber resource extraction. Additionally, it is locally hunted at an unsustainable rate, and captured individuals have been recorded being sold to tourists. To combat loss of suitable habitat, nest boxes have been placed in degraded forest areas.
