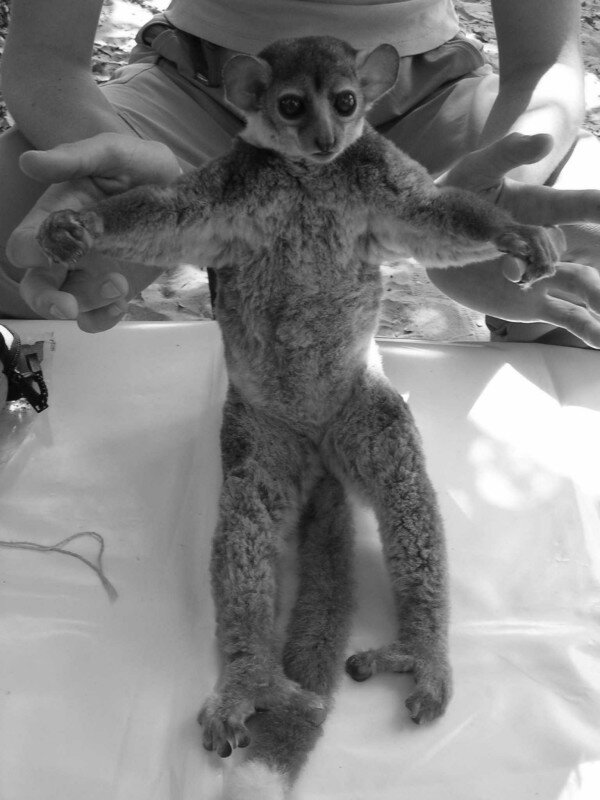

Conservation status
- Endangered (IUCN 3.1)
- CITES Appendix I

Scientific classification
- Kingdom: Animalia
- Phylum: Chordata
- Class: Mammalia
- Infraclass: Placentalia
- Order: Primates
- Suborder: Strepsirrhini
- Family: Lepilemuridae
- Genus: Lepilemur
- Species: L. otto

Binomial name
- Lepilemur otto Craul et al., 2007
- Distribution of L. otto

= Otto's sportive lemur =

Species of lemur

Otto's sportive lemur (Lepilemur otto), or the Ambodimahabibo sportive lemur, is a sportive lemur endemic to Madagascar. Like all members of the genus Lepilemur, it is solitary, nocturnal and largely folivorous. It is threatened by habitat loss and hunting.

== Taxonomy and phylogenetics ==
Otto's sportive lemur was described in 2007 from tissue samples, hair samples and morphometrics collected from live individuals in 2004. The species was recognized as new to science based primarily through genetic evidence. The specific epithet otto honors Michael Otto for his monetary donations to lemur research and conservation.

Genetic analyses show Otto's sportive lemur to be the outgroup to a clade containing Grewcock's sportive lemur and Milne-Edwards' sportive lemur.

== Description ==
Otto's sportive lemur has a grey-brown back and a grey to creamy underside. A dark stripe runs from the uper skull down the spine and ending before the tail. The tail varies from grey-brown to deep brown, and sometimes has a white tip. The face and forehead is grey.

The species differs genetically from its closest relatives, and differences in the NADH4 gene and D-loop region were used as primary evidence that it was a new species in its original description.

== Distribution and habitat ==
Otto's sportive lemur is only known from dry deciduous forest at its type locality of Ambodimahabibo and three other nearby sites. The species is naturally bounded by the Mahajamba River in the west and the Sofia river in the north, beyond which other Lepilemur species occur. Its area of occurrence is estimated to be 3,770 km^{2}.

== Threats and conservation ==
Otto's sportive lemur is severely threatened by forest degradation and conversion due to shifting agriculture, and hunting by humans. It is only known to occur in one protected area, the Forest Corridor of Bongolava. However, this area and the entire area of the species' occurrence has experienced severe deforestation and habitat fragmentation. Urgent research is needed to quantify population size and viability for the species.
