= Ahmanson's sportive lemur =

Conservation status
- Critically Endangered (IUCN 3.1)
- CITES Appendix I

Scientific classification
- Kingdom: Animalia
- Phylum: Chordata
- Class: Mammalia
- Infraclass: Placentalia
- Order: Primates
- Suborder: Strepsirrhini
- Family: Lepilemuridae
- Genus: Lepilemur
- Species: L. ahmansonorum

Binomial name
- Lepilemur ahmansonorum Louis et al.., 2006
- Distribution of L. ahmansonorum

Species of lemur

Ahmanson's sportive lemur (Lepilemur ahmansonorum), or the Tsiombikibo sportive lemur, is a sportive lemur endemic to Madagascar. It is a relatively small sportive lemur with a total length of about 47 to 54 cm (19 to 21 in), of which 23–25 cm (9.1–9.8 in) are tail. Wright's sportive lemur is found in western Madagascar, living in dry forests .

The species was originally named L. ahmansoni, but the name was found to be incorrectly formed and was corrected to L. ahmansonorum in 2009.
