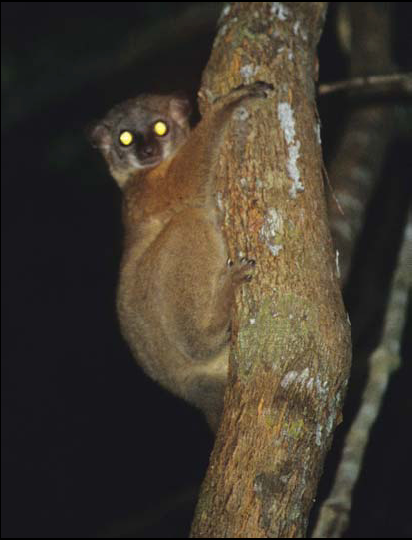

Conservation status
- Endangered (IUCN 3.1)
- CITES Appendix I

Scientific classification
- Kingdom: Animalia
- Phylum: Chordata
- Class: Mammalia
- Order: Primates
- Suborder: Strepsirrhini
- Family: Lepilemuridae
- Genus: Lepilemur
- Species: L. randrianasoloi

Binomial name
- Lepilemur randrianasoloi Andriaholinirina et al., 2017
- Distribution of L. randrianasoloi

= Randrianasolo's sportive lemur =

Species of lemur

Randrianasolo's sportive lemur (Lepilemur randrianasoloi), or the Bemaraha sportive lemur, is a sportive lemur endemic to a small area of western Madagascar. It is threatened by habitat loss.

== Taxonomy and phylogenetics ==
Randrianasolo's sportive lemur was originally described in 2006 as L. randriansoli, in honor of the Malagasy researcher Georges Randrianasolo. However, the name was misspelled and was corrected to L. randrianasoloi in 2009. The original 2006 description was entirely online, and therefore did not meet the pre-2012 ICZN standards to be a valid name. It was therefore given a follow-up description in 2017.

Genetic analyses show Randrianasolo's sportive lemur to be sister to the Antafia sportive lemur.

== Description ==
Randrianasolo's sportive lemur differs from all other members of genus Lepilemur, except the antafia sportive lemur and the red-tailed sportive lemur, by its number of chromosomes (2N=40). It differs from the other two species by its slightly smaller size, narrower but longer head, and cytochrome b sequence. Additionally, the hind feet are longer than in the red-tailed sportive lemur.

It has a total length of about 49 to 56 cm (19 to 22 in), of which 21–26 cm (8.3–10.2 in) is the tail.

== Distribution and habitat ==
Randrianasolo's sportive lemur inhabits dry deciduous forests in a small region of western Madagascar. Known localities include Andramasay forest, Tsingy de Bemaraha National Park and a few other nearby forest fragments. It is estimated to occupy less than 2,200 km^{2} and is found between 47 and 139 metres above sea level.

It has been proposed that the natural northern and southern limits of the species's range are the Manambolo river and Tsiribihina river, respectively. However, this has not been tested empirically.

== Threats ==
The most pressing threat to Randrianasolo's sportive lemur is the clearing of forests within its range for agriculture and timber extraction. Additionally, an 87% reduction in this species's range is expected by 2080 due to climate change alone.
