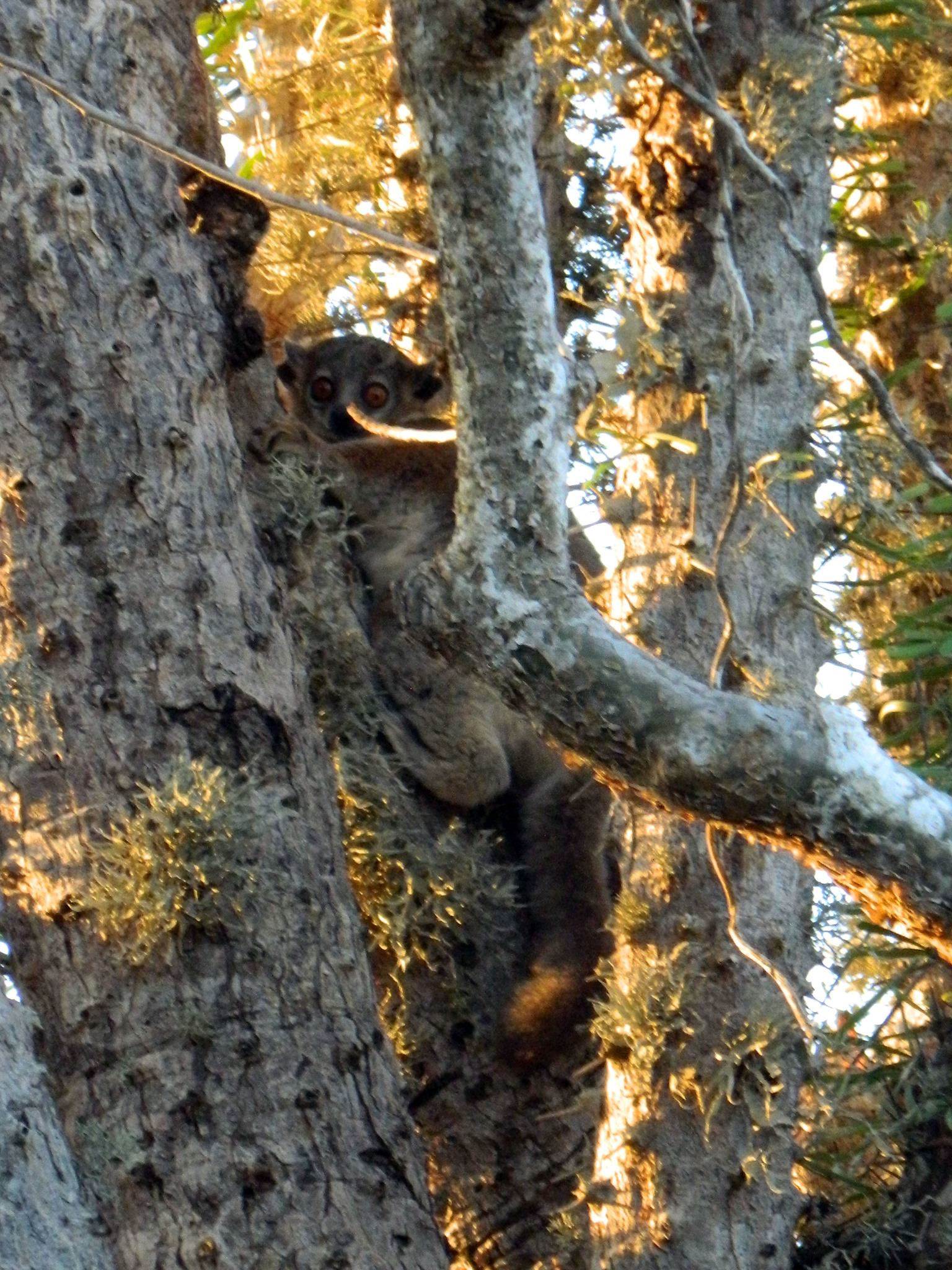

Conservation status
- Endangered (IUCN 3.1)
- CITES Appendix I

Scientific classification
- Kingdom: Animalia
- Phylum: Chordata
- Class: Mammalia
- Infraclass: Placentalia
- Order: Primates
- Suborder: Strepsirrhini
- Family: Lepilemuridae
- Genus: Lepilemur
- Species: L. petteri

Binomial name
- Lepilemur petteri Louis et al.., 2006
- Distribution of L. petteri

= Petter's sportive lemur =

Species of lemur

Petter's sportive lemur (Lepilemur petteri) is a sportive lemur endemic to Madagascar. It is one of 26 species in the genus Lepilemur. It is one of the smaller sportive lemurs with a total length of about 49 to 54 cm (19 to 21 in), of which 22–25 cm (8.7–9.8 in) are tail. Petter's sportive lemur is found in southwestern Madagascar, living in dry spiny forests and some gallery forests.
