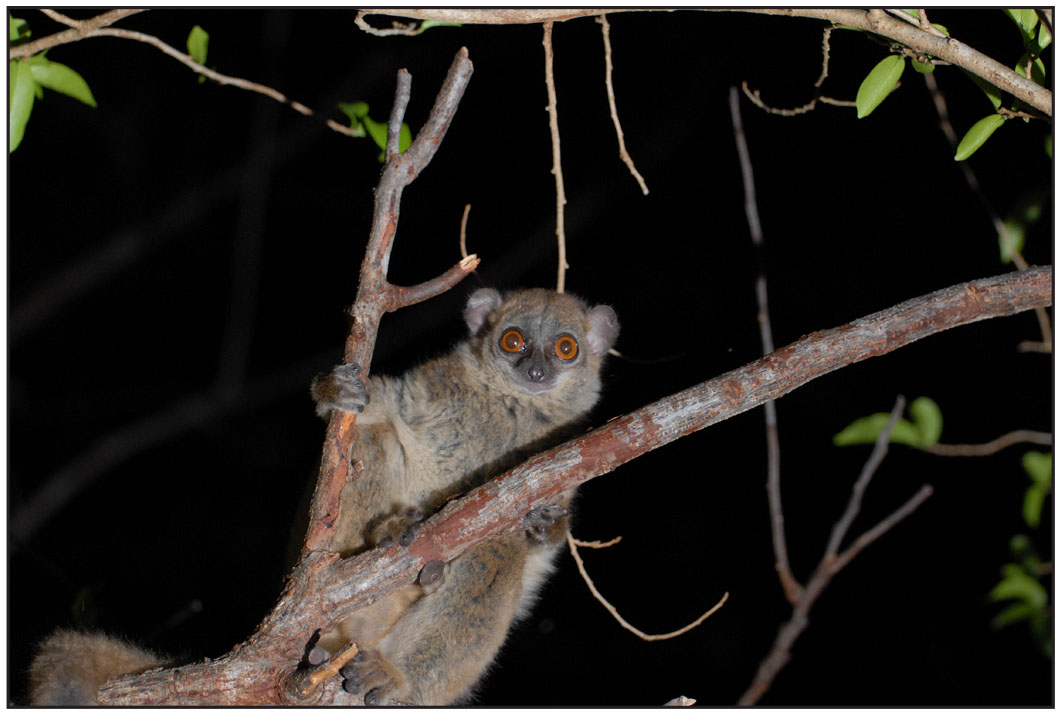

Conservation status
- Critically Endangered (IUCN 3.1)
- CITES Appendix I

Scientific classification
- Kingdom: Animalia
- Phylum: Chordata
- Class: Mammalia
- Infraclass: Placentalia
- Order: Primates
- Suborder: Strepsirrhini
- Family: Lepilemuridae
- Genus: Lepilemur
- Species: L. septentrionalis

Binomial name
- Lepilemur septentrionalis Rumpler & Albignac, 1975
- Distribution of L. septentrionalis

Synonyms
- sahafarensis Rumpler & Albignac, 1975

= Northern sportive lemur =

Species of lemur

The northern sportive lemur (Lepilemur septentrionalis), also known as the Sahafary sportive lemur or northern weasel lemur, is a species of lemur in the family Lepilemuridae. It is endemic to Madagascar. As a result of severe ecological and human pressures, the lemur is classified as Critically Endangered (CR) by the IUCN Red List.

== Taxonomy ==
The genus Lepilemur was initially thought to comprise only 2 species: L. mustelinus and L. ruficaudatus, with the latter subdivided into 2 subspecies. The genus was later reclassified as having only 1 species, mustelinus, with 5 subspecies. In 1977, Petter et al. increased the species number of the genus to 7, at which point the species L. septentrionalis was demarcated, and classified as having 4 subspecies. As 2 of these subspecies were not geographically distinct, the number of L. septentrionalis subspecies was eventually condensed to 2: L. s. septentrionalis and L. s. ankaranensis. As a result of subsequent cytogenetic and molecular analyses, the 7 species of Lepilemur were confirmed by Rumpler et al., but the L. s. ankarensis subspecies was elevated to the status of full species, resulting in 8 species of lemur classified within the genus. A further three molecular genetic studies have led to the inclusion of another 15 species of Lepilemur, making it the most diverse lemur genus at 23 species. In 2004, a study of the evolutionary relationships of various subpopulations of the northern sportive lemur was carried out, in which sequence analyses of the mitochondrial DNA of a large number of L. septentrionalis individuals from the different subpopulations were performed. A significant number of fixed differences present in the lemurs in the Sahafary region distinguished them from the lemurs in other regions, suggesting that the northern sportive lemur in fact exists as two separate cryptic species, most likely caused by chromosomal rearrangements in one of the L. septentrionalis evolutionary lineages.

== Description ==
L. septentrionalis is a sportive lemur, so named due to the boxing-like stance assumed by the lemur when threatened. Northern sportive lemurs grow to a height of around 53 cm (21 in). They have a head and body length and tail length averaging at 25 and 28 cm (9.8 and 11.0 in) respectively, and weigh an average of 0.7 to 0.8 kg (1.5 to 1.8 lb). Their diminutive size makes them one of the smallest species in the genus Lepilemur. Their ears are also relatively less prominent than in the other Lepilemur species. They have a grey underside and their fur coat is a grey-brown colour, which is darkest at the crown and moves down the dorsal line in a dark grey stripe, ending in the rump and the hind limbs as a paler grey. The lemurs often adopt an upright vertical posture, using enlarged and fleshy digital pads on their hands and feet to cling tightly to tree branches. The lemurs can leap from this vertical position, making them an agile arboreal species. Their forward-facing large eyes give the lemurs binocular vision.

== Distribution and habitat ==
The northern sportive lemur inhabits a highly restricted range in Northern Madagascar. The species is located from the left bank of the Loky River to the coast. The natural habitat of the species consists of small patches of deciduous forests north of the Irodo River, near the villages of Madirobe and Ankarongana in the Sahafary region and in the immediate vicinity of Andrahona, which is a small mountain that arises out lowlands south of Antsiranana.

== Behaviour ==
The northern sportive lemur is nocturnal, foraging for food at night and sleeping in the day. The lemurs sleep in holes or dense foliage in trees ranging from 1 to 8 metres (3.3 to 26.2 ft). Females will leave their young on a branch when foraging for food. Males are solitary and territorial, and their territories often overlap with many female home ranges. Male lemurs will aggressively defend their territories in the mating season. The male is generally thought to be loosely polygynous, but it has been suggested that males can be monogamous. L. septentrionalis individuals communicate through chemical communication in the form of latrine behaviour to mark territory, as well as vocal communication (calls). There are two main calls: a loud crow-like call and a contact rejection call. The loud call is used by the lemurs to reveal their presence and territorial claims to other individuals. The contact rejection call is a series of resonant hisses followed by a two-phase vocalisation, most commonly heard when two individuals approach each other in the wild. The contact rejection call is also heard when conspecifics come into contact with each other in captivity, at which point they may also strike each other with their hands.

Breeding interval	Breeding season	Average number of offspring	Range gestation period	Average weaning age	Average time to independence	Average age at sexual or reproductive maturity (female)	Average age at sexual or reproductive maturity (male)
Once per year	April to August	1	120 to 150 days	4 months	1 year	18 months	18 months

== Ecology ==
The northern sportive lemur is a foliovorous species, though they will also eat fruits and flowers to supplement their diet. Similarly to the other sportive lemurs, L. septentrionalis is caecotrophic, consuming its own faeces to digest food for a second time. The species have large bacteria-filled ceca, which helps them to digest plant matter such as cellulose and break it down into sugars and starches.

== Conservation ==
The northern sportive lemur is preyed on by the native Malagasy tree boa, which hunts the lemurs while they are sleeping in tree holes. Large birds of prey, Falconiformes and Strigiformes, are also natural predators of the lemurs. Along with these ecological threats, the arboreal lemur species are also highly threatened by human charcoal production, which still continues to remove the only remaining forest habitat of the lemurs, greatly restricting their range. L. septentrionalis is also illegally hunted as bushmeat. This combination of threats has severely reduced the population of the lemurs to only a few hundred individuals, as estimated by the IUCN Red List. They are classified as Critically Endangered under the IUCN Red List and are listed on CITES Appendix I, which only permits their trade in exceptional circumstances. The known habitat range of the lemurs does not overlap with any protected areas, and although the Andrahona Forest is considered sacred in Madagascar, it shows signs of human incursion.
