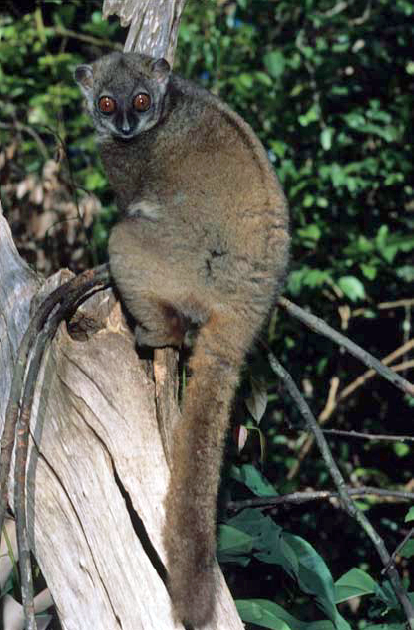

Conservation status
- Critically Endangered (IUCN 3.1)
- CITES Appendix I

Scientific classification
- Kingdom: Animalia
- Phylum: Chordata
- Class: Mammalia
- Infraclass: Placentalia
- Order: Primates
- Suborder: Strepsirrhini
- Family: Lepilemuridae
- Genus: Lepilemur
- Species: L. sahamalaza

Binomial name
- Lepilemur sahamalaza Andriaholinirina et al., 2017
- Distribution of L. sahamalaza

Synonyms
- sahamalazensis Andriaholinirina et al., 2006

= Sahamalaza sportive lemur =

Species of lemur

The Sahamalaza sportive lemur (Lepilemur sahamalaza) is a species of sportive lemur endemic to northern Madagascar.

== Taxonomy ==
The sportive lemurs (Lepilemuridae) constitute a family with only a single genus, Lepilemur. Relationships within this genus are not yet completely resolved, and genetic analyses continue to suggest reclassifications of current species. L. sahamalaza was split from L. dorsalis in 2006 after the latter taxon was found to be paraphyletic. The 2006 description of this species was considered invalid by ICZN standards, and it was formally described in 2017. In 2017, its name was changed from Lepilemur sahamalazensis to Lepilemur sahamalaza.

== Description ==
The Sahamalaza sportive lemur is nocturnal and therefore has large orange eyes which are adapted for seeing in the dark. Individuals weigh 700–900 g (25–32 oz), with females being up to 200 g (7.1 oz) heavier than males. Head-to-body length is approximately 26 cm (10 in), and the tail is equally long. The color of the fur has elements of grey and red-brown, but this is variable depending on light conditions and possibly age of individuals. The lemur has lighter belly fur, which ranges from grey to creamy colored. It has a pronounced sense of smell, and the tip of its nose is moist and very sensitive.

== Distribution and habitat ==
The Sahamalaza sportive lemur is endemic to the Sahamalaza Peninsula in northwestern Madagascar. The peninsula is part of a transition zone between the Sambirano region and the deciduous forest region. The peninsula has been subject to extensive anthropogenic deforestation, and no intact forests remain. The remaining forest consists of five forest fragments. Of these, the most frequently studied is the Ankarafa forest (extent 13°52′S / 45°38′E to 14°27′S / 47°46′E). The Ankarafa forest lies on the transition zone, harboring semi humid forest with tree heights up to 25 m (82 ft). Sahamalaza sportive lemurs like areas with high tree density and canopy cover with many sleeping places. The climate here is seasonal; May–October is cool and dry, while November–April is hot and rainy.

== Ecology ==
=== Diet ===
The majority of the sportive lemurs' diet consists of leaves, but it will also take fruit, flowers, sap, bark and small invertebrates. Leaf-eating primates are rarely nocturnal, presumably because leaves are relatively low in sugars at night, since photosynthesis occurs at a lower rate or not at all. The metabolic rates of Lepilemur species are amongst the lowest recorded in mammalian folivores, and they are highly adapted for surviving on this diet. It has been suggested that Lepilemur species can only fulfil their dietary requirements with the aid of coprophagy (consuming their own feces).

=== Behaviour ===
The Sahamalaza sportive lemur is predominantly arboreal, moving between trees with long jumps powered by its strong hind legs. On the ground, it hops like a kangaroo. It is active and quite vocal at night. By day it hides among leaves or in holes in tree trunks. When resting in tree holes, they like to lay closer to the entrance to feel/be in the sunlight. During its nocturnal activities, the species was found to spend 47% of the time resting and 18% of the time feeding. It is solitary and defends its territory vehemently against same-sex intruders. Territories of males and females can overlap. Sportive lemurs have been found to be inactive for around 50% of their waking time, to rest without much motion for up to 2 hours at a time and to travel on average only 343 m (1,125 ft) per night. Prolonged rates of inactivity presumably allow the digestion and detoxification of low quality food and reduction of overall energy expenditure.

The Sahamalaza sportive lemur attends other species' alarm calls for predator alerts, a habit confirmed by experiments: when the call of a harrier hawk (a predator to Sahamalaza lemurs) was played near them, they became more alert and scanned the sky.

== Threats ==
The Sahamalaza sportive lemur is preyed on by the Malagasy tree boa while sleeping during the day, as well as by birds of prey when in the open. The main anthropogenic threats to the species are habitat loss from deforestation (mostly logging) and subsistence hunting. The Sahamalaza - Iles Radama Nation Park was created in an effort to help increase the population and recoup habitat losses . Wildfires (May to October) are also believed to have an impact.

== Conservation ==
A 2007 survey estimated a total population size of about 3000 individuals across multiple species within the Lepilemur complex, not all of which can be ascribed to this species. The International Union for Conservation of Nature (IUCN) currently classifies the species as critically endangered, largely on the basis of this survey. It is believed that populations have increased as a result of protection.

Networks such as the Association Européenne pour I'Etude et la Conservation des Lémuriens (AEECL) have worked continuously since 2001 to reserve space for the Sahamalaza - Iles Radama National Park; in September 2001 the Sahamalaza Peninsula has been declared a UNESCO biosphere reserve. A partnership with the Wildlife Conservation Society (WCS) helped gain publicity for the program. The main goal of AEECL's work is to ensure that critically endangered lemurs, such as the blue-eyed black lemur and Sahamalaza sportive lemur, retain habitats safe from human interference.
