= Mittermeier's sportive lemur =

Conservation status
- Critically Endangered (IUCN 3.1)
- CITES Appendix I (CITES)

Scientific classification
- Kingdom: Animalia
- Phylum: Chordata
- Class: Mammalia
- Order: Primates
- Suborder: Strepsirrhini
- Family: Lepilemuridae
- Genus: Lepilemur
- Species: L. mittermeieri

Binomial name
- Lepilemur mittermeieri Rabarivola et al., 2006
- Distribution of L. mittermeieri

Species of lemur

Mittermeier's sportive lemur (Lepilemur mittermeieri) is a sportive lemur endemic to the Ampasindava Peninsula in Madagascar.
