= Holland's sportive lemur =

Conservation status
- Critically Endangered (IUCN 3.1)
- CITES Appendix I

Scientific classification
- Kingdom: Animalia
- Phylum: Chordata
- Class: Mammalia
- Infraclass: Placentalia
- Order: Primates
- Suborder: Strepsirrhini
- Family: Lepilemuridae
- Genus: Lepilemur
- Species: L. hollandorum

Binomial name
- Lepilemur hollandorum Ramaromilanto et al., 2009
- Distribution of L. hollandorum

Species of lemur

Holland's sportive lemur (Lepilemur hollandorum), or the Mananara-Nord sportive lemur, is a sportive lemur that is endemic to Madagascar. It is one of 26 species in the genus Lepilemur. This lemur is found specifically in the Mananara-Nord Biosphere Reserve, but the limits of its habitat have yet to be determined. It lives in primary and secondary rainforests. Holland's sportive lemur was described in 2009.

== Description ==
This species of sportive lemur weighs 1 kg (2 lb). It is closest in weight to the weasel sportive lemur.

The pelage on the head, along the shoulders down to the mid back is mottled reddish-gray. The color of its coat then becomes a lighter grayish-brown down to the pygal region of the tail.
