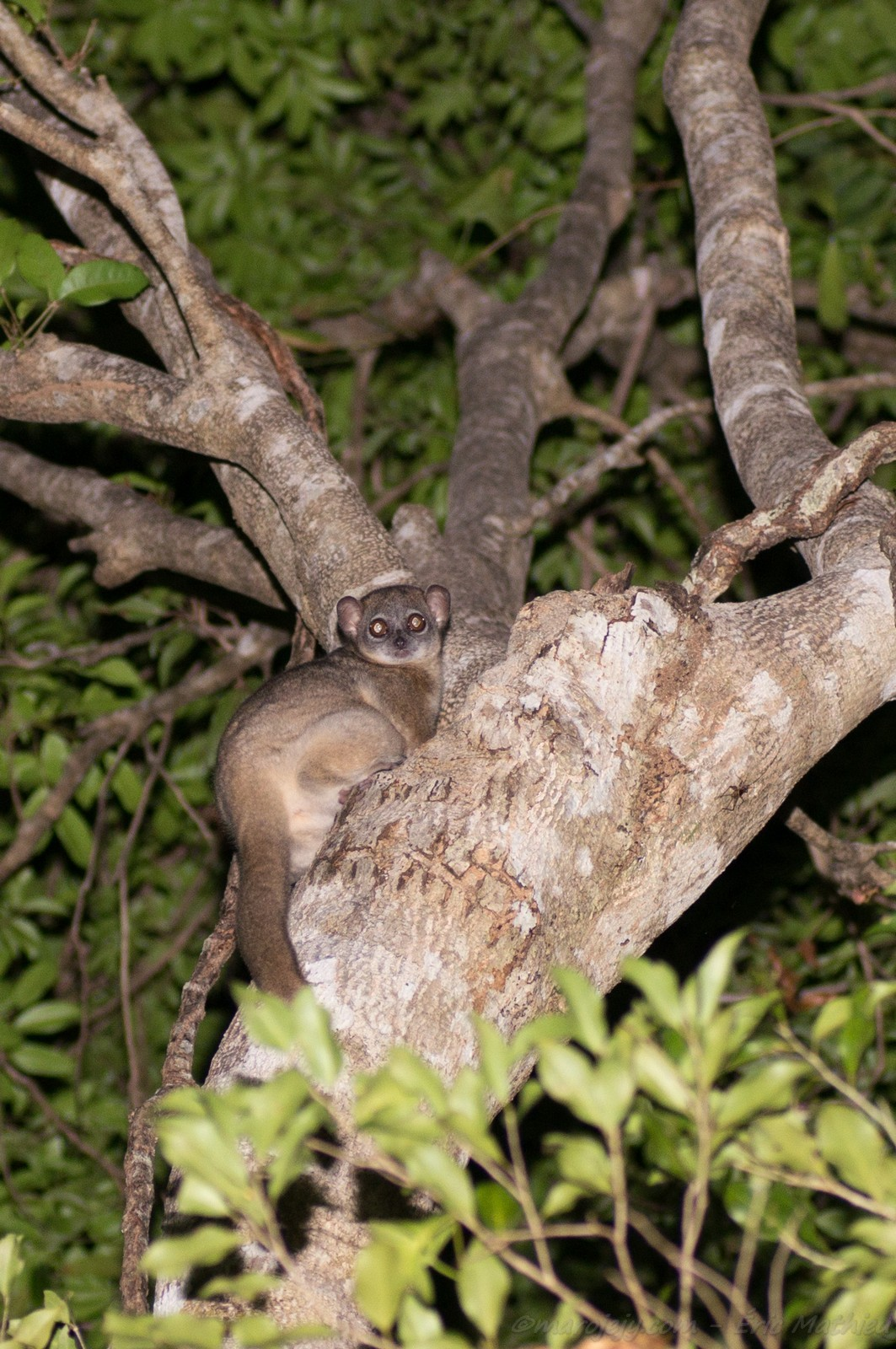

Conservation status
- Endangered (IUCN 3.1)
- CITES Appendix I

Scientific classification
- Kingdom: Animalia
- Phylum: Chordata
- Class: Mammalia
- Infraclass: Placentalia
- Order: Primates
- Suborder: Strepsirrhini
- Family: Lepilemuridae
- Genus: Lepilemur
- Species: L. milanoii

Binomial name
- Lepilemur milanoii Louis et al., 2006
- Distribution of L. milanoii

= Daraina sportive lemur =

Species of lemur

The Daraina sportive lemur (Lepilemur milanoii) is a sportive lemur endemic to Madagascar. It is a relatively small sportive lemur with a total length of about 49 to 56 cm (19 to 22 in), of which 24–27 cm (9.4–10.6 in) are tail.

L. milanoii is found in northern Madagascar, living in dry deciduous, gallery, and semi-evergreen forests. Its known distribution range covers the Loky-Manambato region and the species has surprisingly also been reported to occur in sympatry with L. ankaranensis in the Andrafiamena protected area, both areas being managed by the NGO Fanamby. Daraina sportive lemur has been reported to occur at high densities in the forest fragments of Solaniampilana and Bekaraoka.
