= Grewcock's sportive lemur =

Conservation status
- Critically Endangered (IUCN 3.1)
- CITES Appendix I

Scientific classification
- Kingdom: Animalia
- Phylum: Chordata
- Class: Mammalia
- Infraclass: Placentalia
- Order: Primates
- Suborder: Strepsirrhini
- Family: Lepilemuridae
- Genus: Lepilemur
- Species: L. grewcockorum

Binomial name
- Lepilemur grewcockorum Louis et al.., 2006
- Distribution of L. grewcockorum

Synonyms
- L. manasamody Craul et al., 2007

Species of lemur

Grewcock's sportive lemur (Lepilemur grewcockorum), or the Anjiamangirana sportive lemur, is a sportive lemur endemic to Madagascar. It is a medium-sized sportive lemurs with a total length of about 55 to 63 cm (22 to 25 in), of which 26–30 cm (10–12 in) are tail. Grewcock's sportive lemur is found in northwestern Madagascar, living in dry deciduous forests.

Originally named L. grewcocki, the name was found to be incorrectly formed and was corrected to L. grewcockorum in 2009.

It was also found to be synonymous with the Manasamody sportive lemur (Lepilemur manasamody), known for its primarily grey-brown coloration and known only from Ambongabe and Anjiamangirana I (between the Sofia River in the south and the Maevarano River in the north). The decision was made because the sampling sites were within 2 km (1.2 mi) of each other, and no geographic barrier could be identified.
