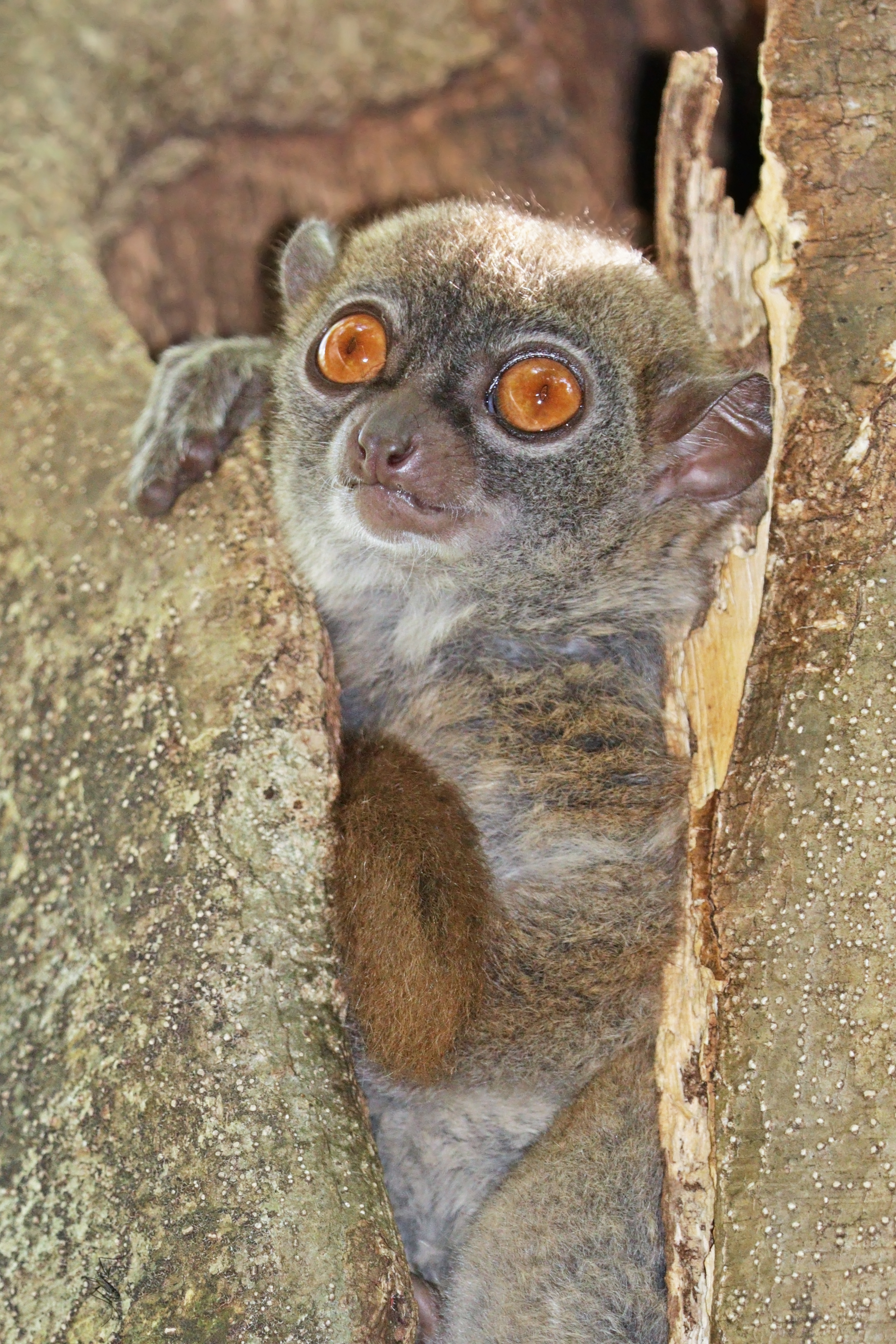
- in Ankarana Reserve, Madagascar

Conservation status
- Endangered (IUCN 3.1)
- CITES Appendix I

Scientific classification
- Kingdom: Animalia
- Phylum: Chordata
- Class: Mammalia
- Infraclass: Placentalia
- Order: Primates
- Suborder: Strepsirrhini
- Family: Lepilemuridae
- Genus: Lepilemur
- Species: L. ankaranensis

Binomial name
- Lepilemur ankaranensis Rumpler & Albignac, 1975
- Distribution of L. ankaranensis

Synonyms
- andrafiamenensis Rumpler & Albignac, 1975

= Ankarana sportive lemur =

Species of lemur

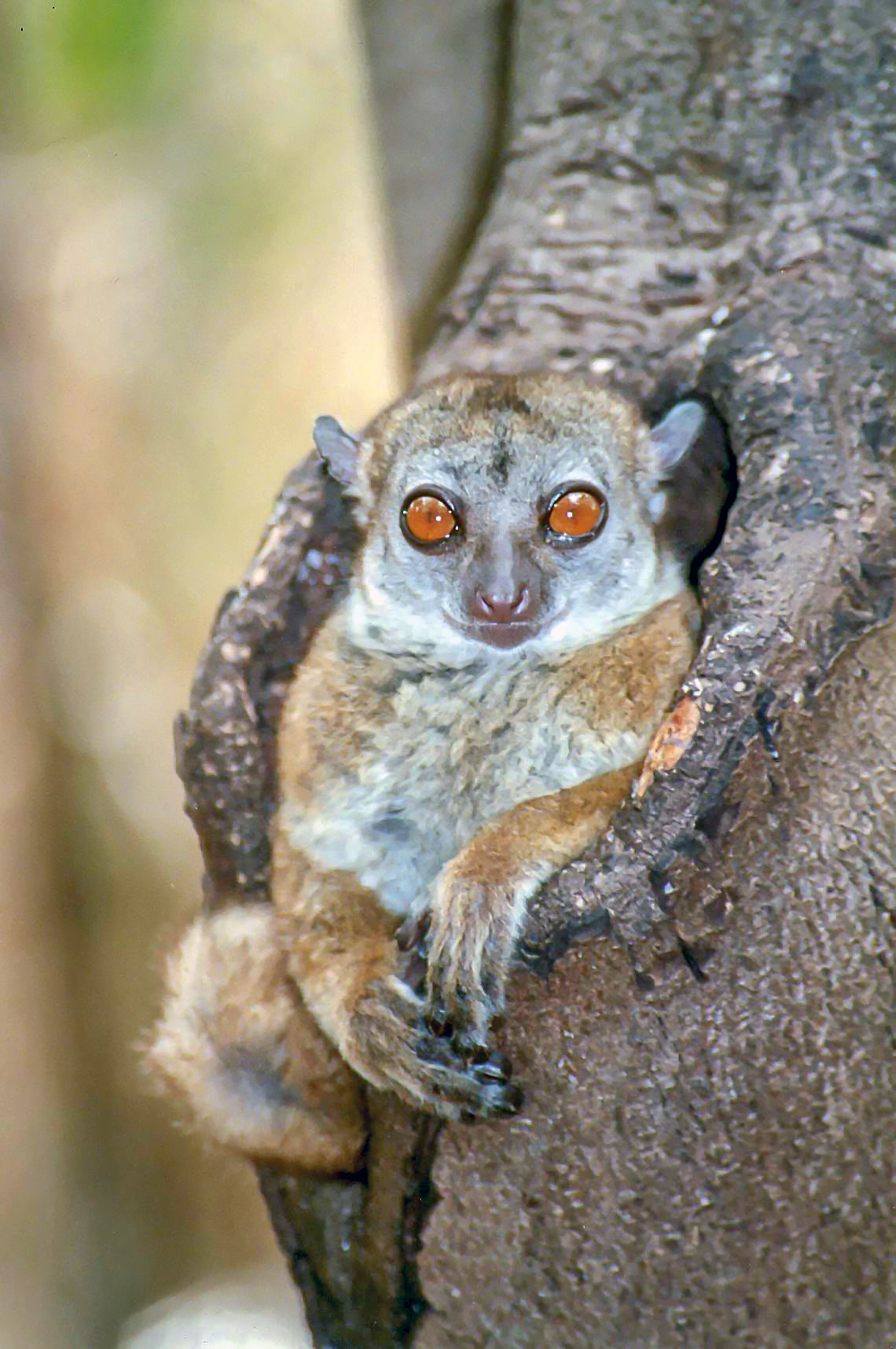

The Ankarana sportive lemur (Lepilemur ankaranensis), or Ankarana weasel lemur, is a sportive lemur endemic to Madagascar. It is one of the smaller sportive lemurs with a total length of about 53 cm (21 in), including 25 cm (9.8 in) of tail. Average body weight is approximately 750 grams (1.65 lb). The Ankarana sportive lemur is found in northern Madagascar, living in dry lowland forests in Ankarana, Andrafiamena and Analamerana, and in moist montane forest of Montagne d'Ambre.
