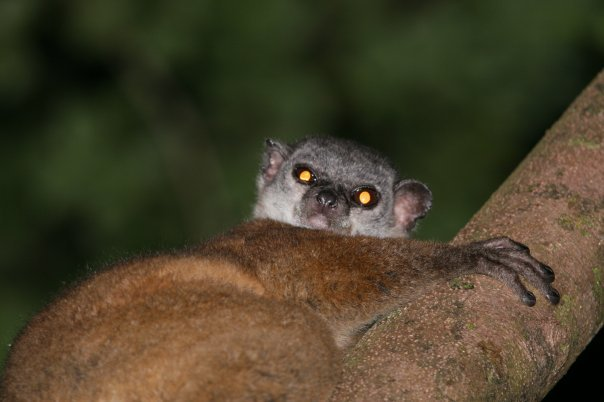

Conservation status
- Endangered (IUCN 3.1)
- CITES Appendix I

Scientific classification
- Kingdom: Animalia
- Phylum: Chordata
- Class: Mammalia
- Infraclass: Placentalia
- Order: Primates
- Suborder: Strepsirrhini
- Family: Lepilemuridae
- Genus: Lepilemur
- Species: L. scottorum

Binomial name
- Lepilemur scottorum Lei et al., 2008
- Distribution of L. scottorum

= Scott's sportive lemur =

Species of lemur

Scott's sportive lemur (Lepilemur scottorum), or the Masoala sportive lemur, is a sportive lemur endemic to Madagascar. This is one of 26 species in the genus Lepilemur. It has greyish brown fur and a black-tipped tail. It is named in honor of the Suzanne and Walter Scott Jr. Foundation.
