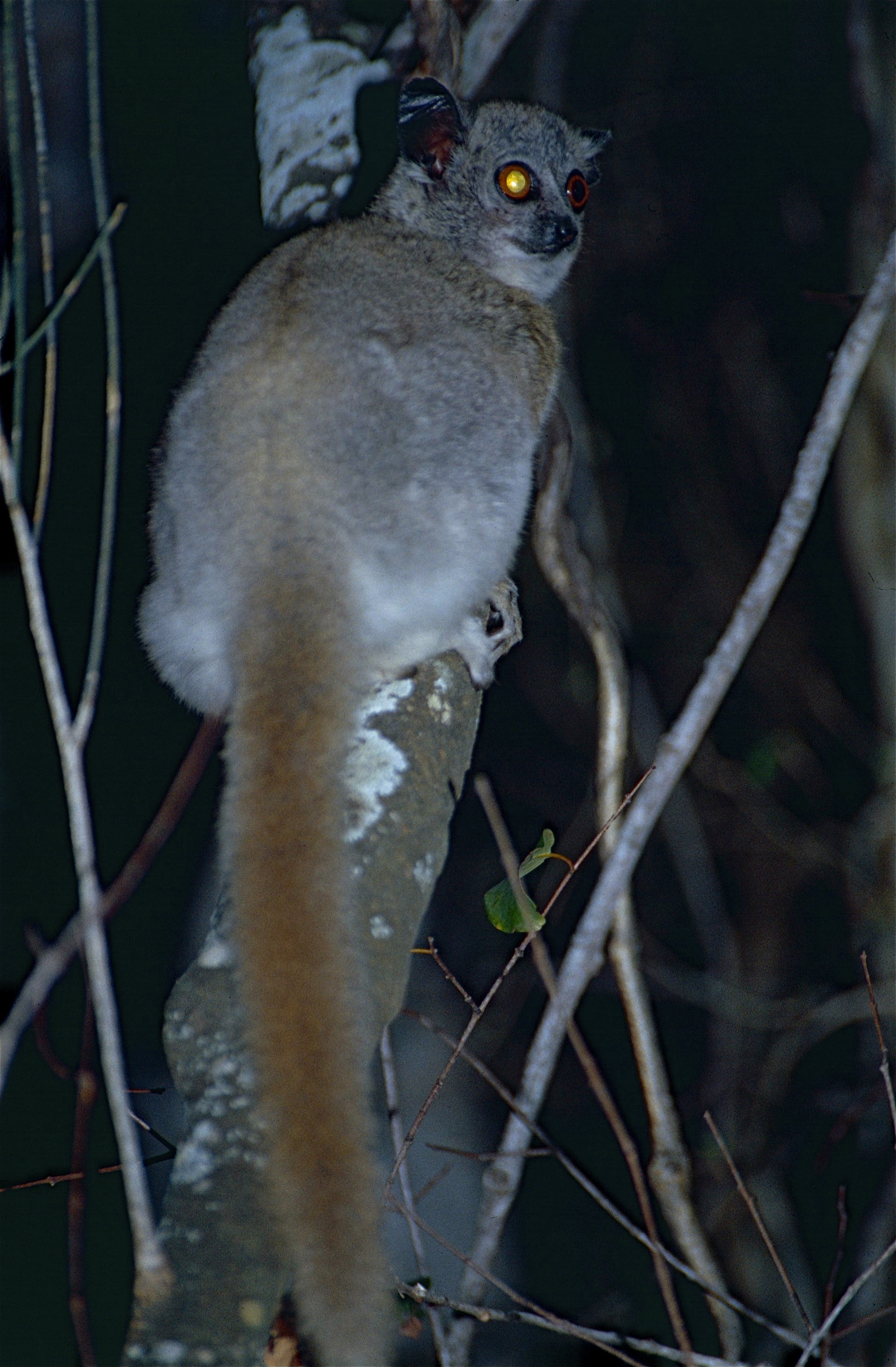

Conservation status
- Endangered (IUCN 3.1)
- CITES Appendix I

Scientific classification
- Kingdom: Animalia
- Phylum: Chordata
- Class: Mammalia
- Infraclass: Placentalia
- Order: Primates
- Suborder: Strepsirrhini
- Family: Lepilemuridae
- Genus: Lepilemur
- Species: L. leucopus

Binomial name
- Lepilemur leucopus Forsyth Major, 1894
- Distribution of L. leucopus

Synonyms
- globiceps Major, 1894

= White-footed sportive lemur =

Species of lemur

The white-footed sportive lemur, white-footed weasel lemur, or dry-bush weasel lemur (Lepilemur leucopus) is a species of lemur in the family Lepilemuridae, the sportive lemurs. It is similar in appearance to other lemurs in the family, with a grey back, a pale grey to white ventral side, and a light brown tail. It is a nocturnal animal that moves through the forest using a vertical clinging and leaping technique. It is endemic to Madagascar, inhabiting the southern subtropical or tropical dry shrubland. It is threatened by habitat loss due to agricultural practices and charcoal production.

== Behaviour ==
=== Diet ===
This sportive lemur eats mainly leaves. During the dry season around Berenty, it may depend entirely on the leaves and flowers of Alluaudia species. This lemur is coprophagous, consuming and redigesting its feces to further breakdown of the cellulose contained in it.

=== Social systems ===
The basic social unit of this species is a mother and her offspring. Males live in solidarity and have territories that will overlap those of one or more females. Males may meet with females during the night for foraging and social grooming. The species is polygynous, with the male visiting several females to mate. The male defends his territory by monitoring it and vocalizing loudly when another male approaches. The male may engage in physical combat to defend his territory.

== Ecology ==
This species of lemur can be found in the southern Madagascar spiny thickets, which are dominated by spiny plants in the family Didiereaceae, and gallery forests. Its range was thought to be limited to the territory between the Menarandra and Mandrare Rivers, but due to recent changes in taxonomic classification in genus Lepilemur, its exact range and distribution is unclear. The Berenty Private Reserve in southern Madagascar has estimated this species to have a density of several hundreds of individuals per square kilometer. Because its range is unclear, of the uncertainty regarding this lemur's habitat range, its International Union for Conservation of Nature (IUCN) conservation status is listed as Data Deficient. If it is in fact limited to the region between the two rivers, it may be relisted as a threatened species.

== Threats and conservation action ==
The use of this species's habitat as pasture for livestock has become a threat to its survival. The forests and shrubland of this region are annually burned to create new pasture for agriculture purposes, which is then overgrazed. This area is also subject to forest clearing to accommodate charcoal production. Populations are protected in Andohahela National Park and the Berenty Private Reserve.
