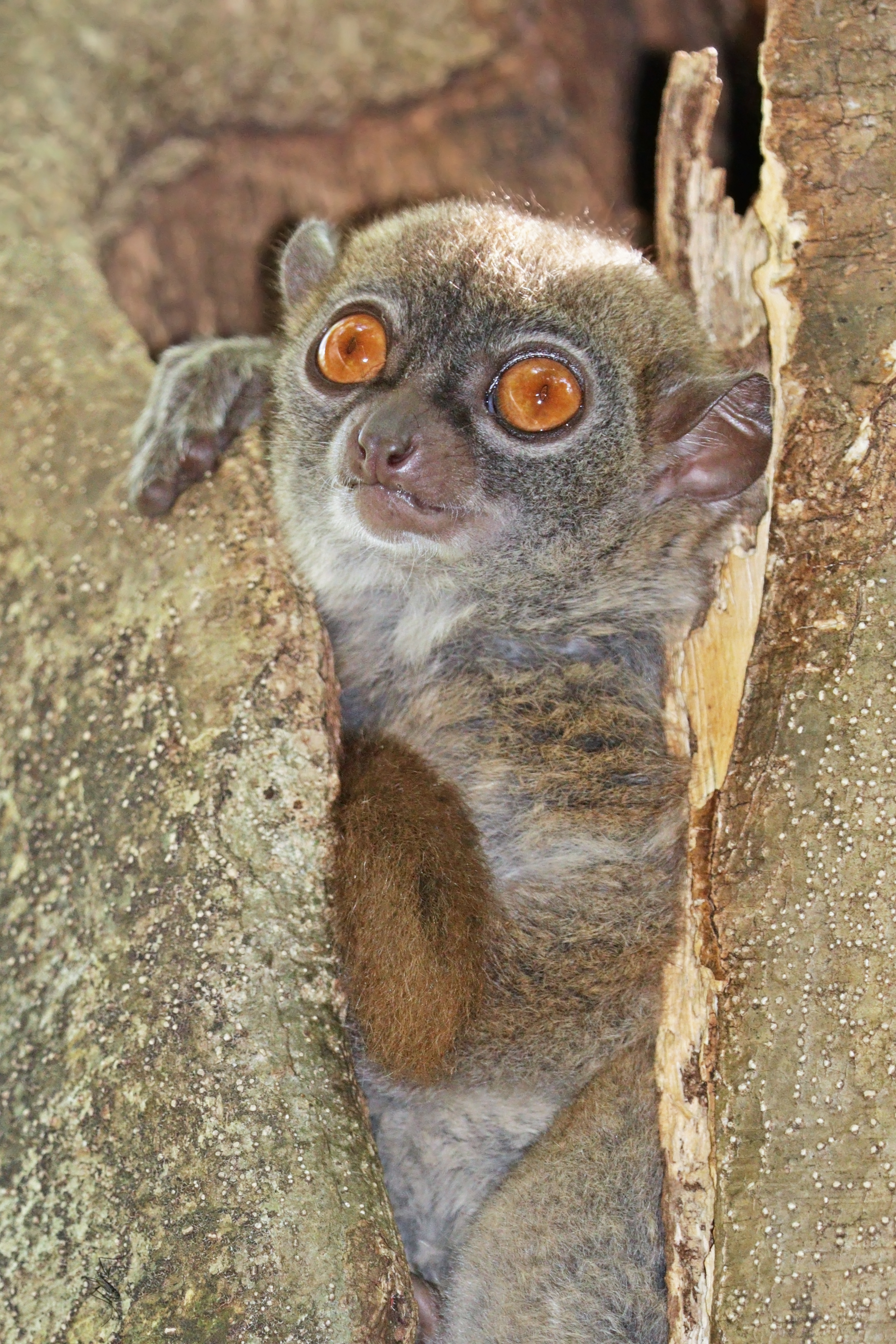
- Ankarana sportive lemur (L. ankaranensis)

Conservation status
- CITES Appendix I (CITES)

Scientific classification
- Domain: Eukaryota
- Kingdom: Animalia
- Phylum: Chordata
- Class: Mammalia
- Order: Primates
- Suborder: Strepsirrhini
- Superfamily: Lemuroidea
- Family: Lepilemuridae; Gray, 1870
- Genus: Lepilemur; I. Geoffroy, 1851

Type species
- Lepilemur mustelinus I. Geoffroy, 1851

Diversity
- About 26 species
- Combined distribution of Lepilemur

Synonyms
- Genus: Galeocebus Wagner, 1855; Lepidilemur Giebel, 1859; Mixocebus Peters, 1874

= Sportive lemur =

Sportive lemurs

Genus of lemurs

The sportive lemurs are the medium-sized primates that make up the family Lepilemuridae. The family consists of only one extant genus, Lepilemur. They are closely related to the other lemurs and exclusively live on the island of Madagascar. For a time, this family was named Megaladapidae, but the current name was given precedence since the extinct genus Megaladapis was removed from the family.

== Etymology ==
French zoologist Isidore Geoffroy Saint-Hilaire first described the genus Lepilemur in 1851, prefixing the existing genus Lemur with the Latin lepidus ("pleasant" or "pretty"). However, it was erroneously spelled—a mistake later authors unsuccessfully attempted to correct to Lepidolemur. Members of the monogeneric family Lepilemuridae are referred to as either sportive or weasel lemurs. "Sportive lemur", which is more commonly used, was coined by Henry Ogg Forbes in 1894. Though he did not explain the name choice, he did mention the agility of Lepilemur. "Weasel lemur" is an older common name, dating to the 1863 publication of Cassell's Popular National History. Dunkel et al. speculated that was inspired by the species name L. mustelinus, which means "weasel-like" in Latin. They were named weasel lemurs for their swiftness like that of mustelids.

== Classification ==
- Family Lepilemuridae: sportive lemurs
  - Genus Lepilemur
    - AEECL's sportive lemur (Lepilemur aeeclis)
    - Ahmanson's sportive lemur (Lepilemur ahmansonorum)
    - Ankarana sportive lemur (Lepilemur ankaranensis)
    - Betsileo sportive lemur (Lepilemur betsileo)
    - Gray-backed sportive lemur (Lepilemur dorsalis)
    - Milne-Edwards' sportive lemur (Lepilemur edwardsi)
    - Fleurete's sportive lemur (Lepilemur fleuretae)
    - Grewcock's sportive lemur (Lepilemur grewcockorum)
    - Holland's sportive lemur (Lepilemur hollandorum)
    - Hubbard's sportive lemur (Lepilemur hubbardorum)
    - James' sportive lemur (Lepilemur jamesorum)
    - White-footed sportive lemur (Lepilemur leucopus)
    - Small-toothed sportive lemur (Lepilemur microdon)
    - Daraina sportive lemur (Lepilemur milanoii)
    - Mittermeier's sportive lemur (Lepilemur mittermeieri)
    - Weasel sportive lemur (Lepilemur mustelinus)
    - Otto's sportive lemur (Lepilemur otto)
    - Petter's sportive lemur (Lepilemur petteri)
    - Randrianasolo's sportive lemur (Lepilemur randrianasoloi)
    - Red-tailed sportive lemur (Lepilemur ruficaudatus)
    - Sahamalaza sportive lemur (Lepilemur sahamalazensis)
    - Scott's sportive lemur (Lepilemur scottorum)
    - Seal's sportive lemur (Lepilemur seali)
    - Northern sportive lemur (Lepilemur septentrionalis)
    - Hawks' sportive lemur (Lepilemur tymerlachsoni)
    - Wright's sportive lemur (Lepilemur wrightae)

== Physical characteristics ==
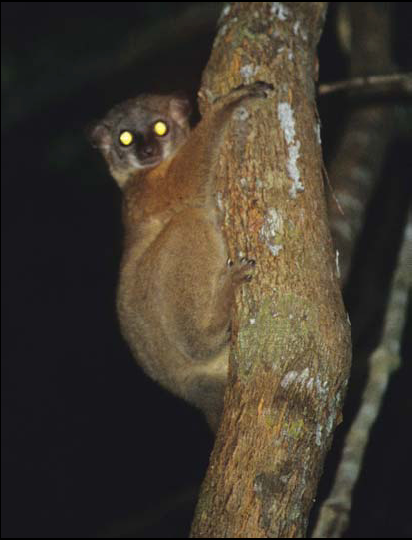
Randrianasolo's sportive lemur

Their fur is grey brown or reddish colored on the top and whitish yellow underneath. They typically have a short head with large, round ears. They grow to a length of 30 to 35 cm (12 to 14 in) (with a tail just about as long as their body) and weigh up to 0.9 kg (2 lb). Their eyes have a tapetum lucidum behind the retina, hence they have eyeshine.

== Behaviour and ecology ==
Sportive lemurs are strictly nocturnal and predominantly arboreal, moving among the trees with long jumps powered by their strong hind legs. On the ground, they hop similarly to the kangaroo. During the day they hide in leafy covering or tree hollows. Sportive lemurs are mostly solitary and defend their territory against same sex intruders. The territories of males and females can overlap.

They are mainly herbivores and their diet consists predominantly of leaves.

Birthing happens between September and December after a gestation of 120 to 150 days, and is usually of a single young which is often reared in a nest in a tree hollow. At about four months the juveniles are weaned but remain with their mother up to an age of one year. At about 18 months they are fully mature, and live to be about eight years old.
