= Betsileo sportive lemur =

Conservation status
- Endangered (IUCN 3.1)
- CITES Appendix I

Scientific classification
- Kingdom: Animalia
- Phylum: Chordata
- Class: Mammalia
- Order: Primates
- Suborder: Strepsirrhini
- Family: Lepilemuridae
- Genus: Lepilemur
- Species: L. betsileo

Binomial name
- Lepilemur betsileo Louis et al.., 2006
- Distribution of L. betsileo

Species of lemur

The Betsileo sportive lemur (Lepilemur betsileo) is a sportive lemur endemic to Madagascar. Like all members of its genus, it is nocturnal and largely folivorous. It is threatened by habitat loss.

== Taxonomy and phylogenetics ==
The Betsileo sportive lemur was described in 2006 based on genetic samples and morphometrics collected in 2000 and 2004. The specific epithet betsileo is in reference to the Betsileo people. Genetic analyses show that the Betsileo sportive lemur is a sister species to James' sportive lemur.

== Description ==
The Betsileo sportive lemur is predominantly grayish to reddish-brown, with the back darker than the underside. The tail is black, contrasting sharply with the rest of the body. The lower face below the mouth is white, while the rest of the face is gray. The fur in the ear auricle is light and bordered by dark hairs along the outer edge.

The species is relatively large. The head-body length measures 25 cm and the tail length is 28 cm, which combined gives a total length of 53 cm. It weighs 1.1-1.2 kg.

== Distribution and habitat ==
The Betsileo sportive lemur is only known from the Fandriana region of central-eastern Madagascar. While the northern and southern limits of its range have yet to be identified, they are suspected to be the Mangoro/Onive and Namorona rivers, respectively. Using niche modeling, a 2018 study estimated the species to occupy 1,167 km^{2} and have a population size of approximately 2,315 individuals. Within its range, it inhabits rainforests.

== Threats and conservation ==
The main threats to the Betsileo sportive lemur is habitat loss due to agricultural practices, use and modification of biological resources, and unsustainable levels of hunting. The only protected area in which it is known to be present is the Bemosary Classified Forest in the Fandriana-Vondrozo Corridor.
