= James' sportive lemur =

Conservation status
- Critically Endangered (IUCN 3.1)
- CITES Appendix I

Scientific classification
- Kingdom: Animalia
- Phylum: Chordata
- Class: Mammalia
- Order: Primates
- Suborder: Strepsirrhini
- Family: Lepilemuridae
- Genus: Lepilemur
- Species: L. jamesi

Binomial name
- Lepilemur jamesi Louis et al., 2006
- Distribution of L. jamesorum

Synonyms
- L. jamesorum

Species of lemur

James' sportive lemur (Lepilemur jamesi), or the Manombo sportive lemur, is a sportive lemur endemic to Madagascar. Like all members of its genus, it is nocturnal and largely folivorous. It is threatened by habitat loss and unsustainable hunting.

== Taxonomy and phylogenetics ==
James' sportive lemur was described in 2006 based on genetic samples and morphometrics collected in 2000 as Lepilemur jamesi. The name was presumed to be incorrectly formed and was corrected in 2009 to Lepilemur jamesorum. However, this change was deemed to be an unjustified emendation. The specific epithet jamesi honors Larry, Jeanette and Barry James for their support of Malagasy graduate students.

Genetic analyses show that James' sportive lemur is a sister species to the Betsileo sportive lemur.

== Description ==
James' sportive lemur possesses short, smooth fur, which is generally brown on the back and lighter grayish brown on the belly and underside of the extremities. The tail is brown closer to the body, and fades into black towards the tip. The face has whitish-gray markings across the jaw and throat from the chin to the ears, and the top of the head is brown with a black midline that continues down almost the entire length of the body. The ears are gray on the back with black borders, usually with a small cream-colored path directly below on the sides of the face.

James' sportive lemur is medium-sized for its genus. It has a head-body length of 26 cm (10 in) and a tail length of 30 cm (12 in), making its total length 56 cm. It weighs approximately 780 g (28 oz).

== Distribution and habitat ==
James' sportive lemur is found in southeastern Madagascar, where it is known from the Manombo Special Reserve and the Manombo Classified Forest. The exact boundaries of its range are unknown, but the Manampatrana River and the Mananara River have been suggested as potential northern and southern limits. Within its range, James' sportive lemur inhabits one of the last remaining, low-altitude coastal rainforests in the southeast.

The estimated population density of James' sportive lemur in the Manombo Special Reserve and the Manombo Classified Forest are 45 individuals/km^{2} and 23 individuals/km^{2}, respectively. The total population is approximately 1,386 individuals, as of 2010.

== Threats and conservation ==
James' sportive lemur is in decline due to habitat loss from shifting agriculture and unsustainable levels of hunting. This decline, in addition to its extremely small distribution, led to its listing as Critically Endangered (CR) on the IUCN Red List in 2020.

James' sportive lemur has appeared twice on the World's 25 Most Endangered Primates list, once in 2017, and again in 2021. As of 2022, it was not being held in captivity.
