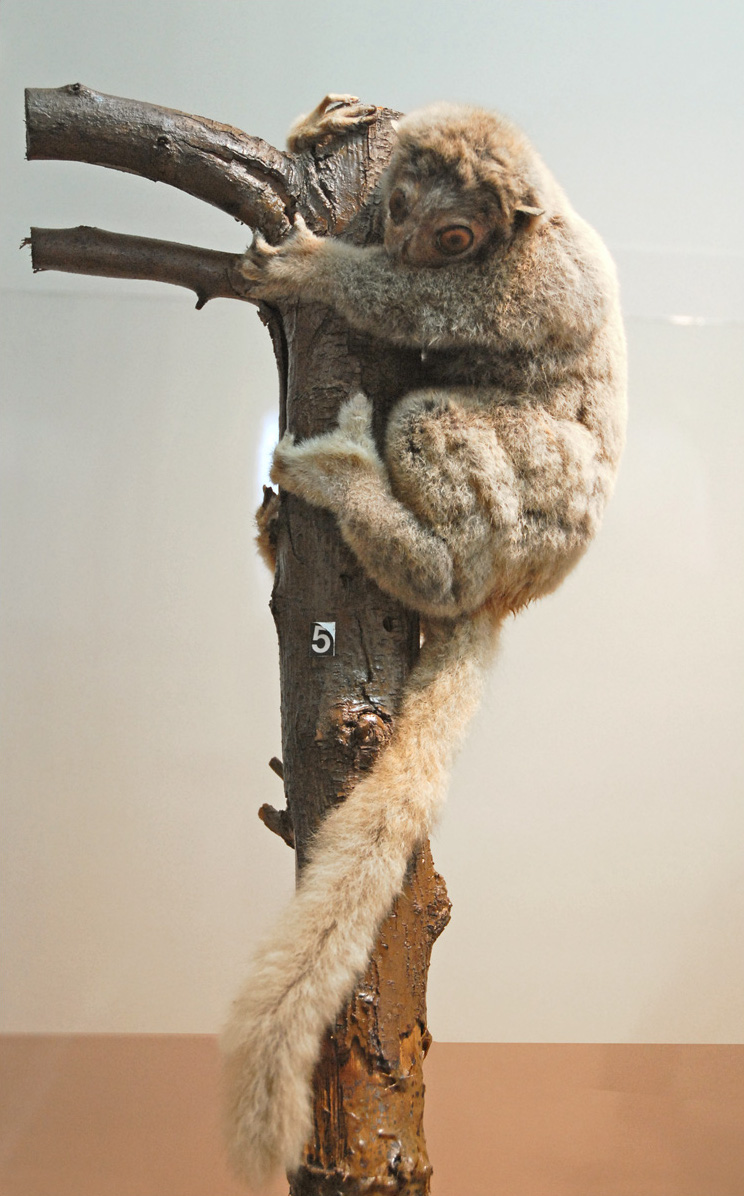

Conservation status
- Endangered (IUCN 3.1)
- CITES Appendix I

Scientific classification
- Kingdom: Animalia
- Phylum: Chordata
- Class: Mammalia
- Infraclass: Placentalia
- Order: Primates
- Suborder: Strepsirrhini
- Family: Lepilemuridae
- Genus: Lepilemur
- Species: L. dorsalis

Binomial name
- Lepilemur dorsalis J. E. Gray, 1870
- Distribution of L. dorsalis

Synonyms
- grandidieri Forsyth Major, 1894

= Gray-backed sportive lemur =

Species of lemur

The gray-backed sportive lemur (Lepilemur dorsalis), also known as Gray's sportive lemur or back-striped sportive lemur, is a species of lemur in the family Lepilemuridae. It is endemic to Madagascar. It is threatened by habitat loss.
