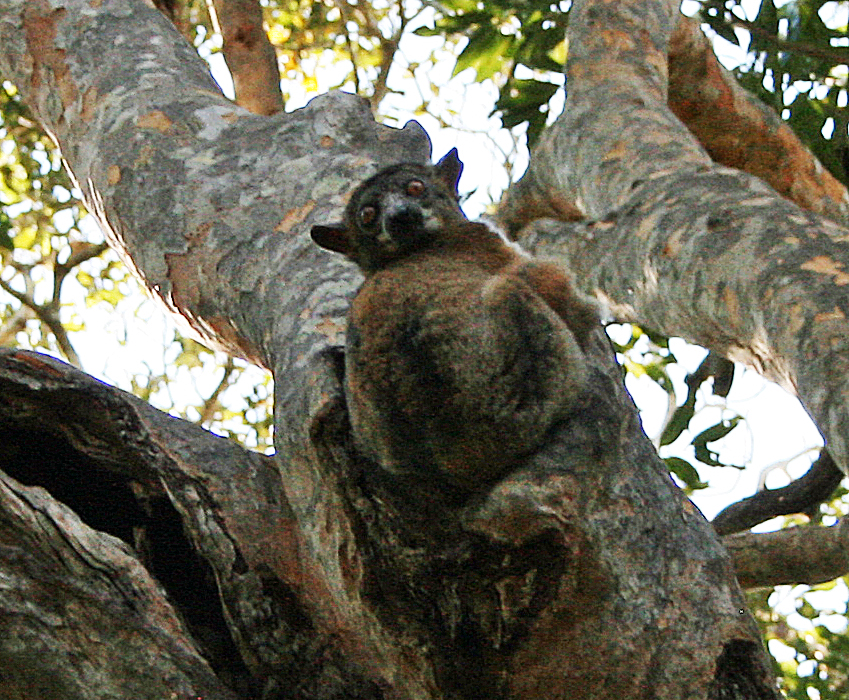

Conservation status
- Critically Endangered (IUCN 3.1)
- CITES Appendix I

Scientific classification
- Kingdom: Animalia
- Phylum: Chordata
- Class: Mammalia
- Infraclass: Placentalia
- Order: Primates
- Suborder: Strepsirrhini
- Family: Lepilemuridae
- Genus: Lepilemur
- Species: L. ruficaudatus

Binomial name
- Lepilemur ruficaudatus Grandidier, 1867
- Distribution of L. ruficaudatus

Synonyms
- pallidicauda Gray, 1873

= Red-tailed sportive lemur =

Species of lemur

The red-tailed sportive lemur (Lepilemur ruficaudatus), or red-tailed weasel lemur, is native to Madagascar like all lemurs. It is a nocturnal species feeding largely on leaves, though they also eat some fruit. Individuals weigh around 800 g (1.8 lb), and there is little sexual dimorphism. In general they live in mated pairs, with a home range of about 10,000 square metres. Both members of the pair use the same home range, and there is little overlap between the home ranges of neighbouring pairs. Travel distances each night are between 100 m (330 ft) and 1 km (0.6 mi), making this a relatively inactive species. This species can be found in the Madagascar dry deciduous forests.

Red-tailed sportive lemurs travel in these pairs because it can be difficult for a male to produce roaming strategies and move further away from the homeland. Therefore, they typically pair up with only one female for reproduction, hence their "partner". Additionally, these Lemurs don't typically have a strong early warning system, making it difficult for them to warn others or send a signal. Instead, they have grown to develop strong escape mechanisms for them to flee danger. Many studies and experiments have been conducted to produce this information.
