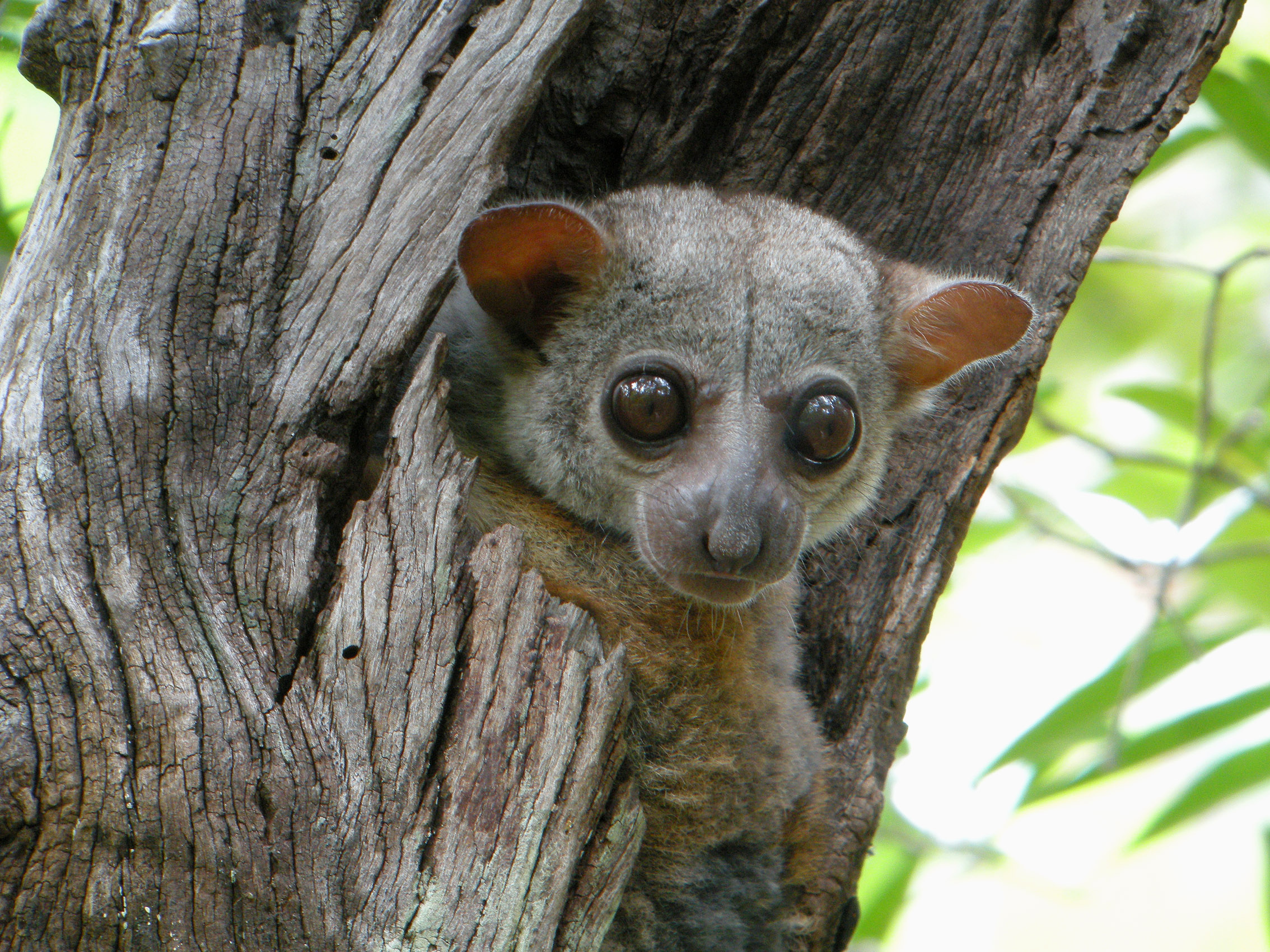

Conservation status
- Endangered (IUCN 3.1)
- CITES Appendix I

Scientific classification
- Kingdom: Animalia
- Phylum: Chordata
- Class: Mammalia
- Order: Primates
- Suborder: Strepsirrhini
- Family: Lepilemuridae
- Genus: Lepilemur
- Species: L. edwardsi

Binomial name
- Lepilemur edwardsi Forsyth Major, 1894
- Distribution of L. edwardsi

Synonyms
- rufescens Lorenz, 1898

= Milne-Edwards' sportive lemur =

Species of lemur

Milne-Edwards' sportive lemur (Lepilemur edwardsi), or Milne-Edwards' weasel lemur, is a species of lemur in the family Lepilemuridae. It is endemic to Madagascar. Its natural habitat is subtropical or tropical dry forests. It is threatened by habitat loss.

An enormous problem for these animals is the limited resource of safe sleeping sites. These are essential for their survival since they provide shelter from predators and weather conditions.

== Habitat ==
Milne-Edwards' sportive lemurs occupy the northern-eastern region of Madagascar, and is commonly known to live in the National Park of Akanrafantsika, but can be found in the Mariarano Classified Forest. They are arboreal and terrestrial, mainly prioritizing broadleaves trees in equatorial climate. They are also establishing their habitat over one hectare of forest. The habitat undergoes important changes in vegetation, temperature, and climate between the rainy and dry seasons.

Deforestation in Madagascar rises to nearly 1% per year on the entire territory. Conservation efforts of Madagascar have been under work since the 1980s, with aid from countries such as the US and France, aiding with funds and management. This aid includes developing strategies for conservation as well as the development of sustainable agriculture to help the population. There is currently a shift in forest density in Madagascar from the coast to the inland parts of the island, meaning species that live within the coastal area, including the Milne-Edward sportive lemurs that occupy the north-west part of the island, will be affected by this shift.

== Behaviour ==
=== Reproduction ===
Milne-Edward's sportive lemurs are seasonal breeders, where males and females are ready to mate during the months of May to July, and stop from August to December. Studies show that their main breeding season only last two months per year on average. As mammals, females hold a gestation period of about four to five months, and typically give birth around October. Giving birth during the rainy time of the year is optimal for the female Milne-Edward's sportive lemur, because it will allow them to produce lactation during the seasonal bounties of their habitats. Annually, females only breed a single offspring, contributing to population decline since they are opposed to anthropogenic degradation.

=== Diet ===
This species of sportive lemur is entirely folivorous. They tend be in competition for food resources with other species from the areas, therefore second-class leaves are often their only available form of sustenance. Observation shows that Milne-Edwards' sportive lemur generally travels in groups of two to five individuals during the night to feed on the same trees as a group, without showing signs of aggressiveness.

Studies have also found that their distribution and group size are intrinsically linked to availability of food resources, hence males and females compete for food together, but they find more benefits in defending the scarce resources as pairs even though feeding two mouths is more difficult than feeding one.

=== Social system ===
They mainly form dispersed pairs and live in groups, showing signs of polyandrous social organization. Sportive lemurs males tend to have smaller testicular size, as they generally breed and engage in cohesive pairs. However, the male Milne-Edwards' show to have bigger testicular volume size compared to the average measurements of sportive lemurs during the breeding time of the year. Hence, this statistic coincides with the sperm competition theory, since a bigger volume in testes might increase chances of reproduction among a community living under an extra-pair copulation social organization.

Nonetheless, Milne-Edwards' sportive lemurs practice duetting, which is uncommon for extra-pair copulation species, meaning that they are actually involved in bounded pairs for taking care of the offspring. Studies also found that bounded pairs share a common sleeping and feeding sites during gestation. This shows that these lemurs must compete for reproduction during the breeding season, but when the females give birth, lemurs actually form pair-partners relationships for the purpose of taking care of the youngster. Males and females engage equally in duetting behaviour; no particular sex difference as of who is starting the calls and who is deciding the order, course, or route of the locomotion, prompting some observers to suggest that they live in an equal society where no gender is dominating the other. A 2024 study, however, found evidence of female dominance in the species.

Other than the fact that duetting is commonly used for territorial defense, Milne-Edwards' sportive lemurs do not produce any sort of territorial markings than its callings. The males' glands do no secrete a form of liquid for scent marking, and they are not known to urinate on their lands to prevent predation. However, some preliminary researches have observed these lemurs bite the tree trunks of their sleeping sites; perhaps it is a way for them to recognize their sleeping sites among the community, or it might even be a small means of asserting their territory.

In short, the bounded-pairs are joining their forces together to defend the sleeping sites, especially during offspring care, but when it is the breeding season they tend to compete for reproduction as pairs are not formed yet.

=== Communication ===
Studies show that Milne-Edwards' male and females engage in duetting activities during the nights, especially for predator avoidance, protection of the territory, and communicational exchanges when pairs are raising an offspring. Duetting in pair-living species is an evolutionary process of a verbal connection made to signal and call the other mate, engaging in duets where one individual will start a call and the other will respond, creating a cooperative vocalization increasing survivability chances through long-distance communication.

Typically, duetting is common among birds and monogamous primates who need to defend a territory collectively. Yet, Milne-Edward's sportive lemurs practice antiphonal callings and shrills when pairs are raising a youngster, even though they live among a dispersed pair-living social organization. They tend to use duets more often to synchronize their activities during nighttime with their pair-partner, with an emphasis on activities of locomotion.

Researchers believe that they have evolved to use duetting in their social structure for the same intentions of monogamous species, which is for joint territory defense, protection of resources, and offspring care. It is also believed that antiphonal callings increase the bounds between pair-living species, proving the bounding relationships of Milne-Edwards' sportive lemur in an extra-pair copopulation society.

=== Infanticide ===
Observations show that infanticide may be a common issue with this species, as it happened relatively frequently during a 2000 study timeframe. According to studies, males tend to attack babies when they are unsupervised, typically when the female is out foraging. At first, males do not want to kill the offspring; rather they want to attack it enough for it to cry for help, so that the female can come to exposed grounds. Then, males take their shots to the females by approaching them to eventually try to reproduce with them, but observations show that females do not typically accept the invitations.

More research is needed to understand the motives behind infanticide, but one hypothesis is that killing the offspring of one allows for sexual competition by ensuring that the offspring comes from a particular gene. Other scientists believe that infanticides might be a form of anxiety relief in resource-scarce environments.

Nonetheless, to cope with infanticide and encourage the health of the offsprings, bounded-pairs can practice duetting to make sure that their offsprings are safe, since duetting is a form of territorial defense and communication.

== Health ==
=== Parasites ===
Milne-Edward's sportive lemur carries a relatively low amount of parasites in relation to other mammals. It also has been observed that there is not a difference in parasites carried between individuals of different body mass and health, indicating that these two factors do not contribute to more or less parasites on the host. Parasites are more commonly found on individuals during the wet season. Although health does not seem to be an important factor for the presence of parasites on Milne-Edwards' sportive lemur, there is also the possibility that the individuals who carry more parasites die off rapidly, influencing the data. There also seems to be a trend of higher amount of parasites among males over females, which is most likely due to testosterone levels.

== Conservation ==
=== Status ===
The species is currently classified as endangered, due to a constant known decline in population from hunting practices in Madagascar and other human actions that leads to a diminution in its territory size and environmental conditions.

=== Population decline ===
Its population suffers from an estimate decline of more than half of its individuals over less than three decades. Specific information on the current number of individuals is unavalailable, but researchers are finding less and less species over hectares of territory, hence showing concerns on this species population levels. Hunting is a major factor that contributes to population loss, which is intrinsically linked to an issue of shortages in nutrition from the surrounding villages of Akanrafantsika, leading villagers to hunt wild animals as one of the primary food sources. Inequalities in resources sharing obligates Akanrafantsika's population to find means to cope with food insecurity; in fact, half of the children living there are underweight due to malnutrition, which inevitably force the population to hunt wild animals such as lemurs for survival.

=== Habitat loss ===
Milne-Edwards' sportive lemur's habitat is currently considered threatened, as its habitat is the target of burning to create pastures for livestock, mining projects or coal. Rainforests in Madagascar are currently subject of debate, as the government has lost control over the rates at which land gets cut down for exploitation, as well as the due rent to the government for used land.

Multiple animal and plant species rely on the forests of Madagascar. Its rich biodiversity mixed with the poverty of the country makes it even more prone to habitat loss, meaning that it is even more imperative to establish a strong conservation plan to protect these rare species. Madasgascar is also home to the lemuriformes infraorder, which comprises about for about a quarter of all primate species.

=== Conservation actions ===
The conservation of Madagascar's natural resources goes back as far as 1896, where France officially annexed Madagascar as a colony with the goal of protecting its forests from the man-made fires, while exploiting timber. In fact, research shows that Madagascar, before human presence was completely covered in forests. The first national park in Madagascar, the Botanical and Zoological Garden of Tsimbazaza, was created by France in 1925. Soon after, the first ten national parks of Madagascar were established, aiming at controlling logging and deforestation for agriculture.

As Madagascar's economic situation kept declining, the government left its forests as an open access for exploitation in early 1980's. Forests both in and out of the protected areas were being cut down by investors from outside of Madagascar. In the 1984, the USAID helped as a donor to stop deforestation. Policies and laws in Madagascar greatly changed starting from 1985, mostly influenced by the donors. In 1988, the Madagascar's National Environment Action Plan (NEAP) was signed by the government, with the goal of protecting Madagascar's forests. In 2003, Marc Ravalomanana, then president, announced the government would put in motion a plan to triple the area of protected lands of Madagascar. It took twelve years to attain this goal, with donations from several organizations.

As of 2009, the USAID conducted an analysis of the conservation efforts over the past 25 years, putting out results that show these efforts were either not ambitious enough or that the plan was not respected, as the precarious situation of the forests of Madagascar has actually worsened since 1985. There is a clear conflict between conservation and the needs of the population, as the protection of the forest hinders the development of food production and revenue, and poverty is often associated with conservation without help from foundations or the government. As population increases, the interest into exploiting protected land grows since it is the only solution for locals to have an income or food, meaning aid for conservation is even more necessary that it ever was.

Milne-Edwards' sportive lemurs have been under the Appendix I of Convention on International Trade in Endangered Species of Wild Fauna and Flora (CITES). Conservation actions needed to mitigate their habitat loss and population decline would require many forms of managements regarding land practices, it would also necessitate an executive authority to monitor and actually impose sanctions to work towards the preservation of the species.
