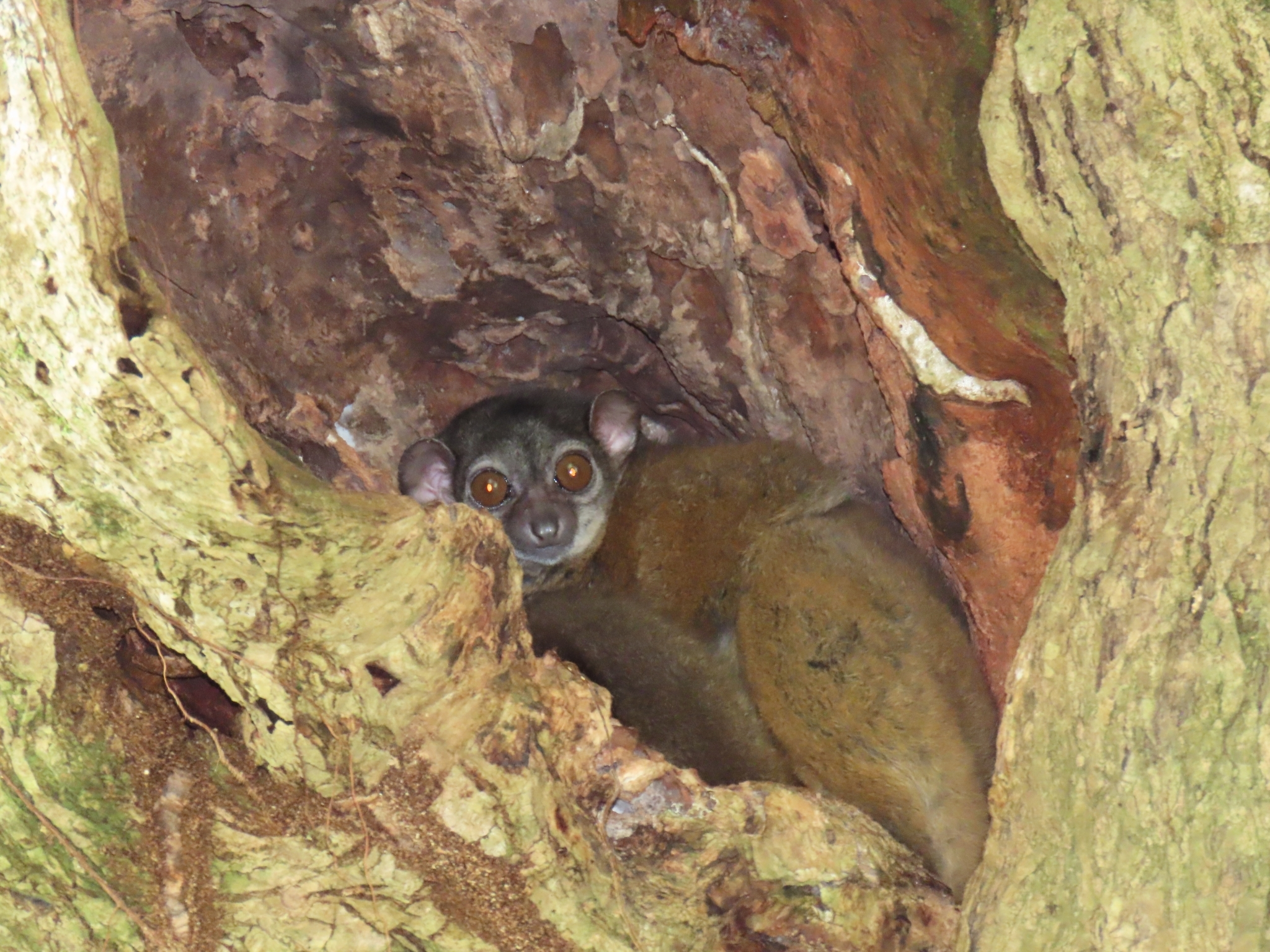
- Lepilemur mustelinus in a tree cavity

Conservation status
- Vulnerable (IUCN 3.1)
- CITES Appendix I

Scientific classification
- Kingdom: Animalia
- Phylum: Chordata
- Class: Mammalia
- Order: Primates
- Suborder: Strepsirrhini
- Family: Lepilemuridae
- Genus: Lepilemur
- Species: L. mustelinus

Binomial name
- Lepilemur mustelinus I. Geoffroy, 1851
- Distribution of L. mustelinus

Synonyms
- caniceps Peters, 1875

= Weasel sportive lemur =

Species of lemur

The weasel sportive lemur (Lepilemur mustelinus), also known as the greater sportive lemur, weasel lemur, or greater weasel lemur, is a species of lemur endemic to Madagascar. Like all members of its genus, it is nocturnal and largely folivorous. Described by Isidore Geoffroy Saint-Hilaire in 1851, it is the type species of genus Lepilemur. It is threatened by habitat loss, climate change and hunting.

== Evolution ==
Phylogenetic studies show that the weasel sportive lemur diverged from its closest relatives, the Betsileo sportive lemur (L. betsileo) and James' sportive lemur (L. jamesi), approximately 1.18 million years ago. These three species are further nested within a clade containing all the Lepilemur species that inhabit Madagascar's eastern rainforests, with the exception of the small-toothed sportive lemur (L. microdon).

== Description ==
The weasel sportive lemur has long, dense fur that is chestnut-brown on the back, often displaying a dark midline stripe. The face is gray or brown, with the cheeks, throat and abdomen slightly lighter. The tail darkens towards the tip. There have also been reports of bright orange morphs in otherwise normally colored populations. It is a relatively large Lepilemur, with a total length of 51–59 cm (20–23 in), of which 26–30 cm (10–12 in) is the body and 25–29 cm (9.8–11.4 in) is the tail. It weighs 0.8–1.2 kg (1.8–2.6 lb).

== Distribution and habitat ==
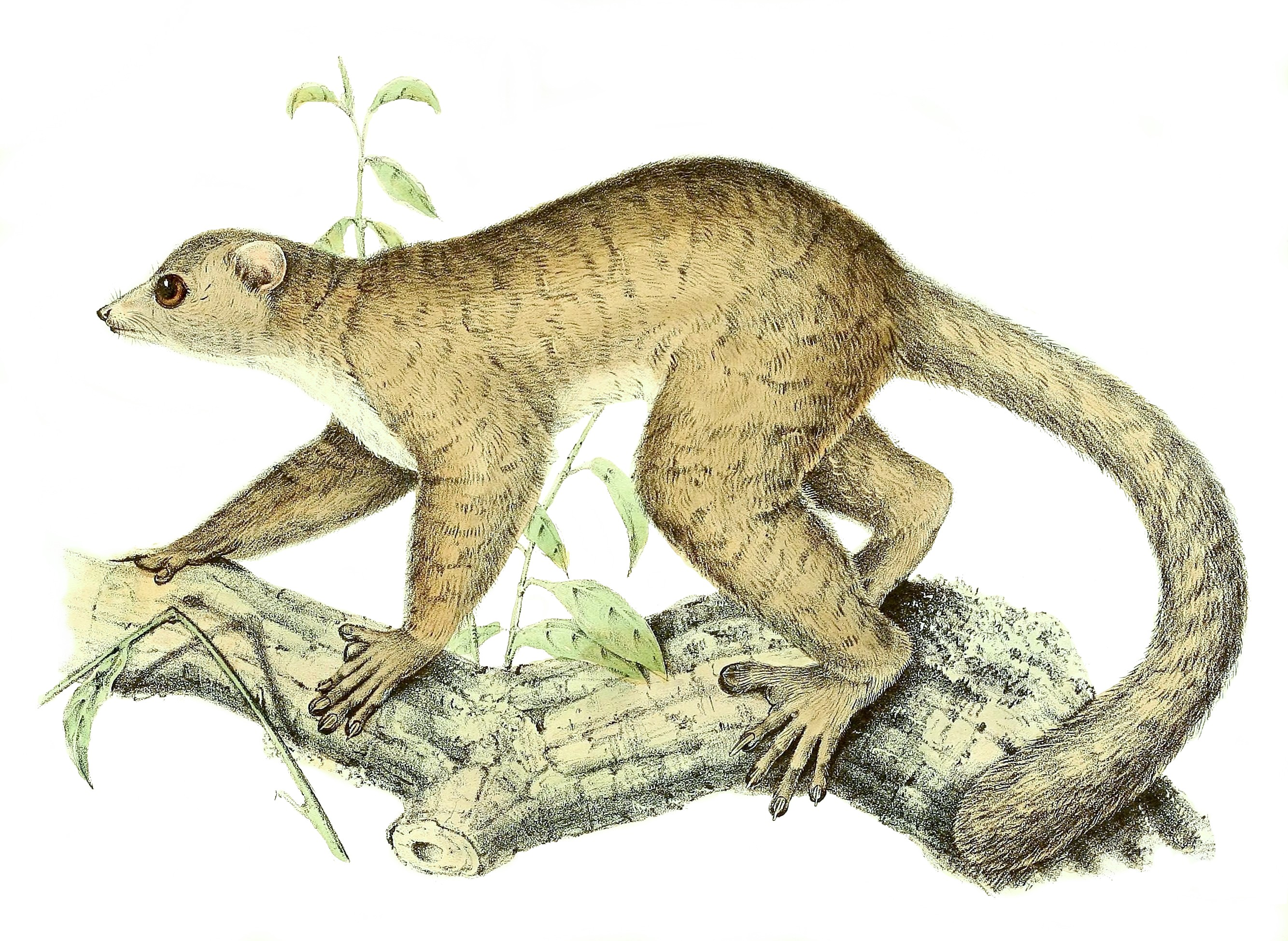
Illustration published in 1868

The weasel sportive lemur inhabits montane and lowland rainforests in eastern Madagascar, from south of the Nosivolo and Mangoro rivers, north to at least the Maningory River. However, Additional work is needed to determine the exact limits of its distribution. Within this range, it is known to occur in Analamazoatra National Park, Mantadia National Park, Zahamena National Park, Mangerivola Special Reserve, Betampona Strict Nature Reserve, Zahamena Strict Nature Reserve, and Tsinjoarivo Classified Forest. The species' estimated extent of occurrence is 18,661 km^{2} (7,205 sq mi).

The weasel sportive lemur has been reported to occupy territories of 1.5 ha (3.7 acres), with population density estimated at 3 to 5 individuals/km^{2} in some areas. During the dry season it sleeps in tree cavities 6–12 m (20–39 ft) above the ground and in vine tangles and leaves during the wet season. Its diet is composed primarily of leaves, but also flowers and fruits. The weasel sportive lemur competes for food with the eastern woolly lemur (Avahi laniger), another nocturnal lemur that primarily feeds on leaves. The two species therefore partake in niche partitioning, with the eastern woolly lemur feeding on leaves of high nutritional value and the weasel sportive lemur subsisting on leaves of lower nutrition and high alkaloid content.

== Threats and conservation ==
The main threats facing the weasel sportive lemur are habitat loss, hunting and climate change. The rainforests in which the species inhabit have lost approximately 30% of their tree cover over the last three generations of the species and appears to be accelerating. Bushmeat hunting also poses a threat, and weasel sportive lemurs are hunted at a rate of 0.02 individuals per household per year in surveyed areas of their distribution. Additionally, climate change is expected to reduce the weasel sportive lemur's distribution by 3% by 2080 through habitat alteration. While no species-specific conservation actions have been implemented, the species is known to occur in multiple national parks and other reserves.
