= Edward E. Louis Jr. =

American conservation geneticist

- Education: Texas A&M University
- Known for: Lemur studies
- Scientific career
- Fields: Conservation geneticist
- Workplaces: Omaha's Henry Doorly Zoo and Aquarium
- Author abbrev. (zoology): Louis

Edward E. Louis Jr. is an American conservation geneticist who founded the Madagascar Biodiversity Partnership (MBP) in 2010. He is both the Director of Conservation Genetics at Omaha's Henry Doorly Zoo and Aquarium and the General Director of the MBP. Louis attended the Texas A&M University receiving his DVM in 1994 and his Ph.D. in Genetics in 1996.

His team was responsible for the identification of 11 species of sportive lemur (Lepilemur) in 2006. He has also helped describe three mouse lemurs (Microcebus) in 2006 and two more mouse lemurs in 2008. He is one of the authors of Lemurs of Madagascar.
