= List of lemuroids =

Species in mammal superfamily Lemuroidea

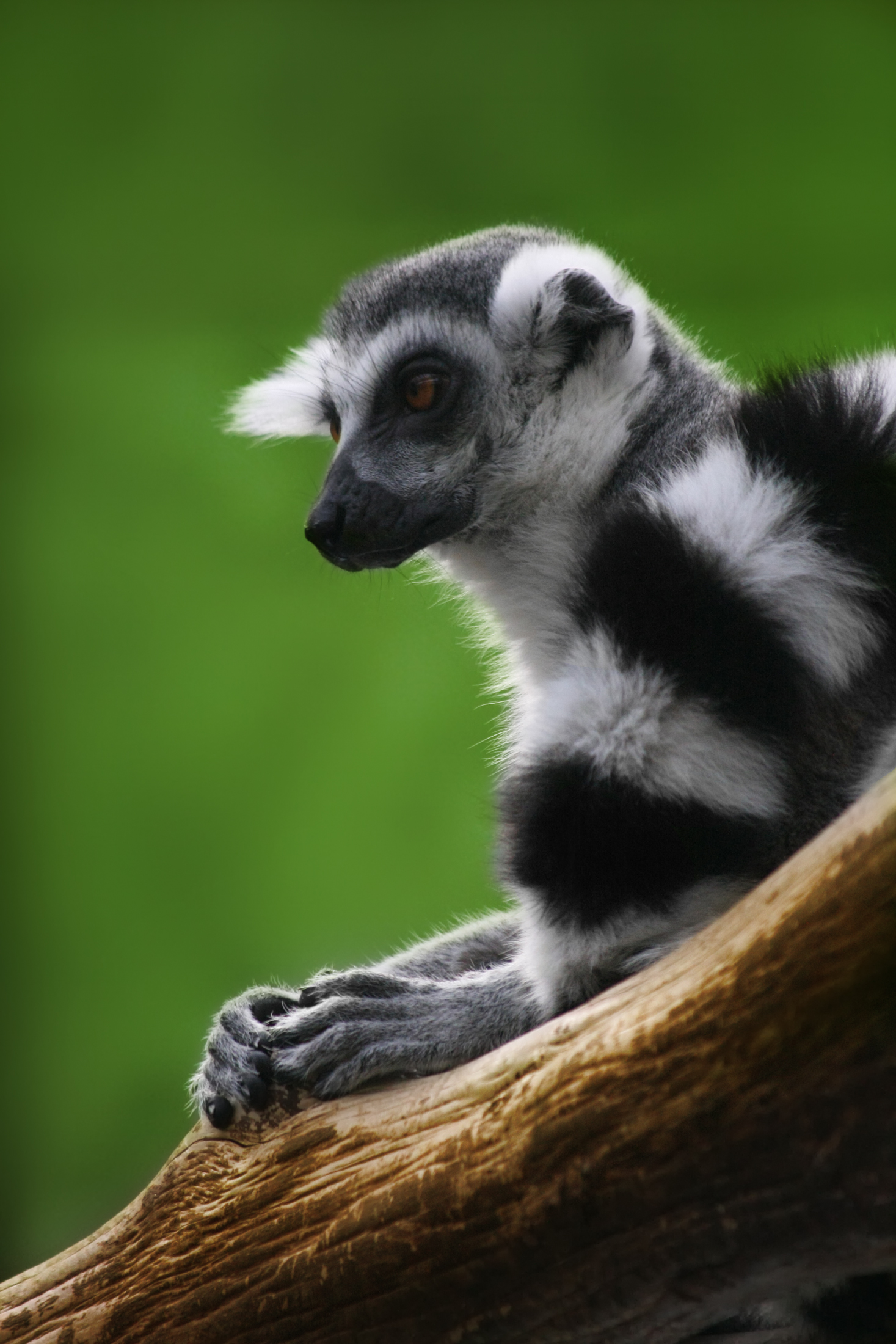
Ring-tailed lemur (Lemur catta)

Lemuroidea is a superfamily of primates. Members of this superfamily are called lemuroids, or lemurs. Lemuroidea is one of two superfamilies that form the suborder Strepsirrhini, itself one of two suborders in the order Primates. They are found exclusively on the island of Madagascar, primarily in forests but with some species also in savannas, shrublands, or wetlands. They range in size from the Margot Marsh's mouse lemur, at 8 cm (3 in) plus a 11 cm (4 in) tail, to the indri, at 90 cm (35 in) plus a 6 cm (2 in) tail. Lemuroids primarily eat fruit, leaves, and insects. Most lemuroids do not have population estimates, but the ones that do range from 40 mature individuals to 5,000. Most lemuroid species are at risk of extinction, with 45 species categorized as endangered, and a further 32 species categorized as critically endangered.

Range of all lemur species

The 107 extant species of Lemuroidea are divided into five families. Cheirogaleidae contains 41 dwarf, mouse, and fork-marked lemur species in five genera. Daubentoniidae contains a single species, the aye-aye. Indriidae contains nineteen woolly lemur and sifaka species in three genera. Lemuridae contains 21 ruffed, ring-tailed, bamboo, and other lemur species in five genera. Lepilemuridae contains 25 sportive lemur species in a single genus.

Dozens of extinct prehistoric lemuroid species have been discovered, though due to ongoing research and discoveries the exact number and categorization is not fixed. At least 17 species and eight genera are believed to have become extinct in the 2,000 years since humans first arrived in Madagascar. All known extinct species were large, ranging in weight from 10 to 200 kg (22 to 441 lb). The largest known subfossil lemur was Archaeoindris fontoynonti, a giant sloth lemur, which weighed more than a modern female gorilla. The extinction of the largest lemurs is often attributed to predation by humans and possibly habitat destruction. Since all extinct lemurs were not only large (and thus ideal prey species), but also slow-moving (and thus more vulnerable to human predation), their presumably slow-reproducing and low-density populations were least likely to survive the introduction of humans. Gradual changes in climate have also been blamed, and may have played a minor role; however since the largest lemurs also survived the climatic changes from previous ice ages and only disappeared following the arrival of humans, it is unlikely that climatic change was largely responsible.

== Conventions ==
IUCN Red List categories
Conservation status
- EX: Extinct (0 species)
- EW: Extinct in the wild (0 species)
- CR: Critically endangered (32 species)
- EN: Endangered (45 species)
- VU: Vulnerable (24 species)
- NT: Near threatened (1 species)
- LC: Least concern (2 species)

Other categories
- DD: Data deficient (3 species)
- NE: Not evaluated (0 species)

The author citation for the species or genus is given after the scientific name; parentheses around the author citation indicate that this was not the original taxonomic placement. Conservation status codes listed follow the International Union for Conservation of Nature (IUCN) Red List of Threatened Species. Range maps are provided wherever possible; if a range map is not available, a description of the lemuroid's range is provided. Ranges are based on the IUCN Red List for that species unless otherwise noted.

== Classification ==
The superfamily Lemuroidea consists of five extant families: Cheirogaleidae, Daubentoniidae, Indriidae, Lemuridae, and Lepilemuridae. Cheirogaleidae contains 41 species in five genera. Daubentoniidae contains a single species. Indriidae contains nineteen species in three genera. Lemuridae contains 21 species in five genera. Lepilemuridae contains 25 lemur species in a single genus. There are additionally three families which went extinct prior to modern record-keeping: Archaeolemuridae, Megaladapidae, and Palaeopropithecidae, as well as an extinct genus in Lemuridae.

Family Archaeolemuridae† (monkey lemurs)

- Genus Archaeolemur†: two extinct species
- Genus Hadropithecus†: one extinct species

Family Cheirogaleidae

- Genus Allocebus (hairy-eared dwarf lemur): one species
- Genus Cheirogaleus (dwarf lemurs): ten species
- Genus Microcebus (mouse lemurs): twenty-four species
- Genus Mirza (giant mouse lemurs): two species
- Genus Phaner (fork-marked lemurs): four species

Family Daubentoniidae

- Genus Daubentonia (aye-aye): one species

Family Indriidae

- Genus Avahi (woolly lemurs): nine species
- Genus Indri (indri): one species
- Genus Propithecus (sifakas): nine species

Family Lemuridae

- Genus Eulemur (true lemurs): twelve species
- Genus Hapalemur (bamboo lemurs): five species
- Genus Lemur (ring-tailed lemur): one species
- Genus Pachylemur†: two extinct species
- Genus Prolemur (greater bamboo lemur): one species
- Genus Varecia (ruffed lemurs): two species

Family Lepilemuridae

- Genus Lepilemur (sportive lemurs): twenty-five species

Family Megaladapidae† (koala lemurs)

- Genus: Megaladapis†

Family Palaeopropithecidae† (sloth lemurs)

- Genus: Archaeoindris†: one extinct species
- Genus: Babakotia†: one extinct species
- Genus: Mesopropithecus†: three extinct species
- Genus: Palaeopropithecus†: three extinct species

- Lemuroidea
  - Daubentoniidae
  - - - Indriidae
      - - Lepilemuridae
        - Cheirogaleidae
    - Lemuridae

- Lemuroidea
  - Daubentoniidae
  - - Lepilemuridae
    - - Cheirogaleidae
      - - Lemuridae
        - Indriidae

There are two competing lemur phylogenies, one by Horvath et al. (top) and one by Orlando et al. (bottom).

== Lemuroids ==
The following classification is based on the taxonomy described by the reference work Mammal Species of the World (2005), with augmentation by generally accepted proposals made since using molecular phylogenetic analysis, as supported by both the IUCN and the American Society of Mammalogists.

=== Family Cheirogaleidae ===
Genus Allocebus – Petter-Rousseaux & Petter, 1967 – one species
Common name	Scientific name and subspecies	Range	Size and ecology	IUCN status and estimated population
Hairy-eared dwarf lemur	A. trichotis (Günther, 1875)	Northeastern Madagascar	Size: 12–15 cm (5–6 in) long, plus about 17 cm (7 in) tail Habitat: Forest Diet: Nectar, fruit, gum, leaves, honey, and insects	EN Unknown

Genus Cheirogaleus – Geoffroy, 1812 – ten species
Common name	Scientific name and subspecies	Range	Size and ecology	IUCN status and estimated population
Ankarana dwarf lemur	C. shethi Frasier, Lei, McLain, Taylor, Bailey, Ginter, Nash, Randriamampionona, Groves, Mittermeier, & Louis Jr., 2016	Northern Madagascar	Size: 16–18 cm (6–7 in) long, plus about 18 cm (7 in) tail Habitat: Forest and shrubland Diet: Fruit	EN Unknown
Fat-tailed dwarf lemur	C. medius Geoffroy, 1812	Southern, western, and northern Madagascar	Size: 20–23 cm (8–9 in) long, plus 20–27 cm (8–11 in) tail Habitat: Forest Diet: Fruit, as well as flowers, seeds, nectar, insects, and small vertebrates	VU Unknown
Furry-eared dwarf lemur	C. crossleyi Grandidier, 1870	Scattered eastern Madagascar	Size: 22–26 cm (9–10 in) long, plus 21–27 cm (8–11 in) tail Habitat: Forest Diet: Nectar, fruit, leaves, and insects	VU Unknown
Greater dwarf lemur	C. major Geoffroy, 1812	Eastern Madagascar	Size: 16–27 cm (6–11 in) long, plus 19–31 cm (7–12 in) tail Habitat: Forest Diet: Fruit, flowers, and nectar, as well as insects, small vertebrates, and honey	VU Unknown
Groves' dwarf lemur	C. grovesi McLain, Lei, Frasier, Taylor, Bailey, Robertson, Nash, Randriamanana, Mittermeier, & Louis Jr., 2017	Southeastern Madagascar	Size: 16–24 cm (6–9 in) long, plus 27–31 cm (11–12 in) tail Habitat: Forest Diet:	DD Unknown
Lavasoa dwarf lemur	C. lavasoensis Thiele, Razafimahatratra, & Hapke, 2013	Southern Madagascar	Size: 50–55 cm (20–22 in) long, including tail Habitat: Forest Diet:	EN Unknown
Lesser iron-gray dwarf lemur	C. minusculus Groves, 2000	Central Madagascar	Size: Unknown Habitat: Forest Diet: Unknown	DD Unknown
Montagne d'Ambre dwarf lemur	C. andysabini Lei, McLain, Frasier, Taylor, Bailey, Engberg, Ginter, Nash, Randriamampionona, Groves, Mittermeier, & Louis Jr., 2015	Northern Madagascar	Size: 16–18 cm (6–7 in) long, plus 26–27 cm (10–11 in) tail Habitat: Forest Diet:	EN Unknown
Sibree's dwarf lemur	C. sibreei Forsyth Major, 1896	Eastern Madagascar	Size: Unknown Habitat: Forest Diet: Unknown	CR Unknown
Thomas' dwarf lemur	C. thomasi (Forsyth Major, 1894)	Southeastern Madagascar	Size: Unknown Habitat: Forest Diet: Fruit and flowers	EN Unknown

Genus Microcebus – Geoffroy, 1834 – 24 species
Common name	Scientific name and subspecies	Range	Size and ecology	IUCN status and estimated population
Anosy mouse lemur	M. tanosi Rasoloarison, Weisrock, Yoder, Rakotondravony, & Kappeler, 2013	Southeastern Madagascar	Size: 10–16 cm (4–6 in) long, plus 11–15 cm (4–6 in) tail Habitat: Forest Diet: Fruit and insects	EN Unknown
Arnhold's mouse lemur	M. arnholdi Louis, Engberg, McGuire, McCormick, Randriamampionona, Ranaivoarisoa, Bailey, Mittermeier, & Lei, 2008	Northern Madagascar	Size: 9–13 cm (4–5 in) long, plus 10–14 cm (4–6 in) tail Habitat: Forest Diet: Insect secretions, arthropods, small vertebrates, fruit, and flowers	VU Unknown
Bemanasy mouse lemur	M. manitatra Hotaling, Foley, Lawrence, Bocanegra, Blanco, Rasoloarison, Kappeler, Barrett, Yoder, & Weisrock, 2016	Southeastern Madagascar	Size: 12–13 cm (5 in) long, plus about 15 cm (6 in) tail Habitat: Forest Diet: Insect secretions, arthropods, small vertebrates, fruit, and flowers	CR Unknown
Bongolava mouse lemur	M. bongolavensis Olivieri, Zimmermann, Randrianambinina, Rasoloharijaona, Rakotondravony, Guschanski, & Radespiel, 2007	Northern Madagascar	Size: 11–14 cm (4–6 in) long, plus 14–17 cm (6–7 in) tail Habitat: Forest Diet: Insect secretions, arthropods, small vertebrates, fruit, and flowers	EN Unknown
Brown mouse lemur	M. rufus Geoffroy, 1834	Southeastern Madagascar	Size: About 13 cm (5 in) long, plus about 12 cm (5 in) tail Habitat: Forest Diet: Fruit, as well as insects, leaves, flowers, gum, nectar, and pollen	VU Unknown
Claire's mouse lemur	M. mamiratra Andriantompohavana, Zaonarivelo, Engberg, Randriamampionona, McGuire, Shore, Rakotonomenjanahary, Brenneman, & Louis Jr., 2006	Northern Madagascar	Size: 11–14 cm (4–6 in) long, plus 14–17 cm (6–7 in) tail Habitat: Forest Diet: Insect secretions, arthropods, small vertebrates, fruit, and flowers	EN Unknown
Danfoss's mouse lemur	M. danfossi Olivieri, Zimmermann, Randrianambinina, Rasoloharijaona, Rakotondravony, Guschanski, & Radespiel, 2007	Northern Madagascar	Size: 10–12 cm (4–5 in) long, plus 15–17 cm (6–7 in) tail Habitat: Forest Diet: Insect secretions, arthropods, small vertebrates, fruit, and flowers	VU Unknown
Ganzhorn's mouse lemur	M. ganzhorni Hotaling, Foley, Lawrence, Bocanegra, Blanco, Rasoloarison, Kappeler, Barrett, Yoder, & Weisrock, 2016	Southeastern Madagascar	Size: Habitat: Forest Diet: Fruit and insects	EN Unknown
Gerp's mouse lemur	M. gerpi Radespiel, Ratsimbazafy, Rasoloharijaona, Raveloson, Andriaholinirina, Rakotondravony, Randrianarison, & Randrianambinina, 2012	Eastern Madagascar	Size: 9–10 cm (4 in) long, plus about 15 cm (6 in) tail Habitat: Forest Diet: Insect secretions, arthropods, small vertebrates, fruit, and flowers	CR Unknown
Golden-brown mouse lemur	M. ravelobensis Zimmermann, Cepok, Rakotoarison, Zietemann, & Radespiel, 1998	Northern Madagascar	Size: 12–14 cm (5–6 in) long, plus 14–18 cm (6–7 in) tail Habitat: Forest Diet: Gum, insect excretions, nectar, fruit, leaves, and animal matter	VU Unknown
Goodman's mouse lemur	M. lehilahytsara Roos & Kappeler, 2005	Northeastern Madagascar	Size: 9–10 cm (4 in) long, plus 11–12 cm (4–5 in) tail Habitat: Forest Diet: Fruit and insects	NT Unknown
Gray mouse lemur	M. murinus (J. F. Miller, 1777)	Western and southern Madagascar	Size: 12–14 cm (5–6 in) long, plus 13–15 cm (5–6 in) tail Habitat: Forest and shrubland Diet: Insects, as well as small reptiles, plants, leaves, fruit, and flowers	LC Unknown
Jolly's mouse lemur	M. jollyae Louis, Coles, Andriantompohavana, Sommer, Engberg, Zaonarivelo, Mayor, & Brenneman, 2006	Eastern Madagascar	Size: 9–10 cm (4 in) long, plus 12–13 cm (5 in) tail Habitat: Forest Diet: Fruit	EN Unknown
MacArthur's mouse lemur	M. macarthurii Radespiel, Olivieri, Rasolofoson, Rakotondratsimba, Rakotonirainy, Rasoloharijaona, Randrianambinina, Ratsimbazafy, Ratelolahy, Randriamboavonjy, Rasolofoharivelo, Craul, Rakotozafy, & Randrianarison, 2008	Northern Madagascar	Size: 11–14 cm (4–6 in) long, plus 13–15 cm (5–6 in) tail Habitat: Forest Diet: Insect secretions, arthropods, small vertebrates, fruit, and flowers	EN Unknown
Madame Berthe's mouse lemur	M. berthae Rasoloarison, Goodman, & Ganzhorn, 2000	Western Madagascar	Size: 9–11 cm (4 in) long, plus 12–14 cm (5–6 in) tail Habitat: Forest Diet: Honeydew, as well as gum, flowers, fruit, arthropods, and small vertebrates	CR Unknown
Margot Marsh's mouse lemur	M. margotmarshae Louis, Engberg, McGuire, McCormick, Randriamampionona, Ranaivoarisoa, Bailey, Mittermeier, & Lei, 2008	Northern Madagascar	Size: 8–13 cm (3–5 in) long, plus 11–16 cm (4–6 in) tail Habitat: Forest Diet: Insect secretions, arthropods, small vertebrates, fruit, and flowers	EN Unknown
Marohita mouse lemur	M. marohita Rasoloarison, Weisrock, Yoder, Rakotondravony, & Kappeler, 2013	Eastern Madagascar	Size: 13–15 cm (5–6 in) long, plus 13–15 cm (5–6 in) tail Habitat: Forest Diet: Insect secretions, arthropods, small vertebrates, fruit, and flowers	CR Unknown
Jonah's mouse lemur	M. jonahi Schüssler, Blanco, Salmona, Poelstra, Andriambeloson, Miller, Randrianambinina, Rasolofoson, Mantilla-Contreras, Chikhi, Louis, Yoder, & Radespiel, 2020	Northeastern Madagascar	Size: 12–14 cm (5–6 in) long, plus 12–14 cm (5–6 in) tail Habitat: Forest Diet: Fruit and insects	EN Unknown
Northern rufous mouse lemur	M. tavaratra (Rasoloarison, Goodman, & Ganzhorn, 2000)	Northern Madagascar	Size: 11–14 cm (4–6 in) long, plus 14–17 cm (6–7 in) tail Habitat: Forest and shrubland Diet: Insect secretions, arthropods, small vertebrates, fruit, and flowers	VU Unknown
Nosy Boraha mouse lemur	M. boraha Hotaling, Foley, Lawrence, Bocanegra, Blanco, Rasoloarison, Kappeler, Barrett, Yoder, & Weisrock, 2016	Northeastern Madagascar	Size: Habitat: Unknown Diet: Insect secretions, arthropods, small vertebrates, fruit, and flowers	DD Unknown
Pygmy mouse lemur	M. myoxinus Peters, 1852	Western Madagascar	Size: 12–13 cm (5 in) long, plus 24–26 cm (9–10 in) tail Habitat: Forest Diet: Fruit, as well as flowers, gums, and insects	VU Unknown
Reddish-gray mouse lemur	M. griseorufus Kollman, 1910	Southern Madagascar	Size: 11–14 cm (4–6 in) long, plus 13–16 cm (5–6 in) tail Habitat: Forest and shrubland Diet: Fruit and gum, as well as flowers and arthropods	LC Unknown
Sambirano mouse lemur	M. sambiranensis Rasoloarison, Goodman, & Ganzhorn, 2000	Northern Madagascar	Size: 11–13 cm (4–5 in) long, plus 13–15 cm (5–6 in) tail Habitat: Forest Diet: Insect secretions, arthropods, small vertebrates, fruit, and flowers	EN Unknown
Simmons' mouse lemur	M. simmonsi Louis, Coles, Andriantompohavana, Sommer, Engberg, Zaonarivelo, Mayor, & Brenneman, 2006	Eastern Madagascar	Size: 9–10 cm (4 in) long, plus 14–15 cm (6 in) tail Habitat: Forest Diet: Insect secretions, arthropods, small vertebrates, fruit, and flowers	EN Unknown

Genus Mirza – Gray, 1870 – two species
Common name	Scientific name and subspecies	Range	Size and ecology	IUCN status and estimated population
Coquerel's giant mouse lemur	M. coquereli Grandidier, 1867	Western Madagascar	Size: 23–27 cm (9–11 in) long, plus 31–32 cm (12–13 in) tail Habitat: Forest Diet: Fruit, flowers, and invertebrates, as well as small vertebrates	EN Unknown
Northern giant mouse lemur	M. zaza Kappeler & Roos, 2005	Northern Madagascar	Size: 23–25 cm (9–10 in) long, plus 26–29 cm (10–11 in) tail Habitat: Forest Diet: Fruit, insect secretions, and sap	VU Unknown

Genus Phaner – Gray, 1870 – four species
Common name	Scientific name and subspecies	Range	Size and ecology	IUCN status and estimated population
Amber Mountain fork-marked lemur	P. electromontis Groves & Tattersall, 1991	Northern Madagascar	Size: 22–29 cm (9–11 in) long, plus 28–37 cm (11–15 in) tail Habitat: Forest Diet:	EN Unknown
Masoala fork-marked lemur	P. furcifer Blainville, 1839	Northeastern Madagascar	Size: 22–29 cm (9–11 in) long, plus 28–37 cm (11–15 in) tail Habitat: Forest Diet: Gum, as well as insects	EN Unknown
Pale fork-marked lemur	P. pallescens Groves & Tattersall, 1991	Western Madagascar	Size: 23–29 cm (9–11 in) long, plus 29–37 cm (11–15 in) tail Habitat: Forest Diet: Sap and gum, as well as insects, insect secretions, fruit, flowers, and nectar	EN Unknown
Pariente's fork-marked lemur	P. parienti Groves & Tattersall, 1991	Northern Madagascar	Size: 22–29 cm (9–11 in) long, plus 28–37 cm (11–15 in) tail Habitat: Forest Diet: Gum	EN Unknown

=== Family Daubentoniidae ===
Genus Daubentonia – Geoffroy, 1795 – one species
Common name	Scientific name and subspecies	Range	Size and ecology	IUCN status and estimated population
Aye-aye	D. madagascariensis Gmelin, 1788	Western and eastern Madagascar	Size: 36–44 cm (14–17 in) long, plus tail Habitat: Forest and shrubland Diet: Fruit, nuts, and sap	EN Unknown

=== Family Indriidae ===
Genus Avahi – Jourdan, 1834 – nine species
Common name	Scientific name and subspecies	Range	Size and ecology	IUCN status and estimated population
Bemaraha woolly lemur	A. cleesei Thalmann & Geissmann, 2005	Western Madagascar	Size: 26–37 cm (10–15 in) long, plus 29–35 cm (11–14 in) tail Habitat: Forest Diet: Buds and leaves	CR Unknown
Betsileo woolly lemur	A. betsileo Andriantompohavana, Lei, Zaonarivelo, Engberg, Nalanirina, McGuire, Shore, Andrianasolo, Herrington, Brenneman, & Louis Jr., 2007	Eastern Madagascar	Size: 25–34 cm (10–13 in) long, plus 28–35 cm (11–14 in) tail Habitat: Forest Diet:	EN Unknown
Eastern woolly lemur	A. laniger Gmelin, 1788	Eastern Madagascar	Size: 30–45 cm (12–18 in) long plus tail Habitat: Forest Diet: Leaves, as well as flowers and fruit	VU Unknown
Moore's woolly lemur	A. mooreorum Lei, Engberg, Andriantompohavana, McGuire, Mittermeier, Zaonarivelo, Brenneman, & Louis Jr., 2008	Eastern Madagascar	Size: 28–34 cm (11–13 in) long, plus 29–38 cm (11–15 in) tail Habitat: Forest Diet: Leaves	EN Unknown
Peyrieras's woolly lemur	A. peyrierasi Zaramody, Fausser, Roos, Zinner, Andriaholinirina, Rabarivola, Norscia, Tattersall, & Rumpler, 2006	Southern Madagascar	Size: 26–32 cm (10–13 in) long, plus 28–35 cm (11–14 in) tail Habitat: Forest Diet: Leaves, as well as flowers and fruit	VU Unknown
Ramanantsoavana's woolly lemur	A. ramanantsoavani Zaramody, Fausser, Roos, Zinner, Andriaholinirina, Rabarivola, Norscia, Tattersall, & Rumpler, 2006	Southern Madagascar	Size: 27–34 cm (11–13 in) long, plus 26–39 cm (10–15 in) tail Habitat: Forest Diet:	VU Unknown
Sambirano woolly lemur	A. unicolor Thalmann & Geissmann, 2000	Northern Madagascar	Size: 25–29 cm (10–11 in) long, plus 31–36 cm (12–14 in) tail Habitat: Forest Diet:	CR Unknown
Southern woolly lemur	A. meridionalis Zaramody, Fausser, Roos, Zinner, Andriaholinirina, Rabarivola, Norscia, Tattersall, & Rumpler, 2006	Southern Madagascar	Size: 29–33 cm (11–13 in) long, plus 29–38 cm (11–15 in) tail Habitat: Forest Diet: Leaves	EN Unknown
Western woolly lemur	A. occidentalis Liburnau, 1898	Northern Madagascar	Size: 25–29 cm (10–11 in) long, plus 31–37 cm (12–15 in) tail Habitat: Forest Diet: Leaves	VU Unknown

Genus Indri – Geoffroy & Cuvier, 1796 – one species
Common name	Scientific name and subspecies	Range	Size and ecology	IUCN status and estimated population
Indri	I. indri (Gmelin, 1788) Two subspecies: I. i. indri; I. i. variegatus	Northeastern Madagascar	Size: 60–90 cm (24–35 in) long, plus 5–6 cm (2 in) tail Habitat: Forest Diet: Fruit, leaves, and flowers	CR Unknown

Genus Propithecus – Bennett, 1832 – nine species
Common name	Scientific name and subspecies	Range	Size and ecology	IUCN status and estimated population
Coquerel's sifaka	P. coquereli Grandidier, 1867	Northern Madagascar	Size: 42–50 cm (17–20 in) long, plus 50–60 cm (20–24 in) tail Habitat: Forest Diet: Leaves, seeds, flowers, fruit, and bark	CR Unknown
Crowned sifaka	P. coronatus H. Milne-Edwards, 1871	Western Madagascar	Size: About 45 cm (18 in) long, plus 56 cm (22 in) tail Habitat: Forest Diet: Flowers and leaves, as well as fruit	CR Unknown
Diademed sifaka	P. diadema Bennett, 1832	Eastern Madagascar	Size: 45–55 cm (18–22 in) long, plus 43–56 cm (17–22 in) Habitat: Forest Diet: Leaves, flowers, fruit, and shoots	CR Unknown
Golden-crowned sifaka	P. tattersalli Simons, 1988	Northern Madagascar	Size: About 48 cm (19 in) long, plus about 39 cm (15 in) tail Habitat: Forest, savanna, and shrubland Diet: Seeds, fruit, leaves, and flowers, as well as bark	CR 4,000–5,000
Milne-Edwards's sifaka	P. edwardsi Grandidier, 1871	Southeastern Madagascar	Size: 42–52 cm (17–20 in) long, plus 41–48 cm (16–19 in) tail Habitat: Forest Diet: Fruit, as well as leaves, seeds, and flowers	EN Unknown
Perrier's sifaka	P. perrieri Lavauden, 1931	Northern Madagascar	Size: About 49 cm (19 in) long, plus tail Habitat: Forest Diet: Leaves, flowers, and fruit	CR 125
Silky sifaka	P. candidus Grandidier, 1871	Northern Madagascar	Size: 48–54 cm (19–21 in) long, plus 45–51 cm (18–20 in) tail Habitat: Forest Diet: Leaves, seeds, fruit, and flowers, as well as bark and soil	CR 250
Verreaux's sifaka	P. verreauxi Grandidier, 1867	Southwestern Madagascar	Size: 45–55 cm (18–22 in) long, plus 43–56 cm (17–22 in) tail Habitat: Forest and shrubland Diet: Leaves, bark, and flowers, as well as fruit	CR Unknown
Von der Decken's sifaka	P. deckenii Grandidier, 1867	Western Madagascar	Size: About 45 cm (18 in) long, plus 45 cm (18 in) tail Habitat: Forest Diet: Leaves	CR Unknown

=== Family Lemuridae ===
Genus Eulemur – Simons & Rumpler, 1988 – twelve species
Common name	Scientific name and subspecies	Range	Size and ecology	IUCN status and estimated population
Black lemur	E. macaco (Linnaeus, 1766)	Northern Madagascar	Size: 30–50 cm (12–20 in) long, plus 40–60 cm (16–24 in) tail Habitat: Forest Diet: Fruit, as well as flowers, nectar, leaves, bark, soil, and ants	EN Unknown
Blue-eyed black lemur	E. flavifrons Gray, 1867	Northern Madagascar	Size: 39–45 cm (15–18 in) long, plus 51–65 cm (20–26 in) tail Habitat: Forest Diet: Fruit and leaves	CR Unknown
Collared brown lemur	E. collaris Geoffroy, 1817	Southern Madagascar	Size: 39–40 cm (15–16 in) long, plus 50–55 cm (20–22 in) tail Habitat: Forest Diet: Fruit, as well as flowers, young leaves, and insects	EN Unknown
Common brown lemur	E. fulvus Geoffroy, 1796	Northeastern Madagascar	Size: 41–51 cm (16–20 in) long, plus 41–51 cm (16–20 in) tail Habitat: Forest Diet: Leaves, as well as flowers, fruit, and bark	VU Unknown
Crowned lemur	E. coronatus (Gray, 1842)	Northern Madagascar	Size: About 34 cm (13 in) long, plus about 45 cm (18 in) tail Habitat: Forest Diet: Fruit, as well as leaves	EN Unknown
Gray-headed lemur	E. cinereiceps Grandidier & A. Milne-Edwards, 1890	Southeastern Madagascar	Size: 39–41 cm (15–16 in) long, plus 50–55 cm (20–22 in) tail Habitat: Forest Diet: Fruit, as well as flowers, leaves, nectar, fungi, and insects	CR Unknown
Mongoose lemur	E. mongoz (Linnaeus, 1766)	Northern Madagascar	Size: About 35 cm (14 in) long, plus about 48 cm (19 in) tail Habitat: Forest Diet: Flowers, pollen, fruit, and leaves	CR Unknown
Red lemur	E. rufus (Audebert, 1799)	Northwestern lemur	Size: About 38 cm (15 in) long, plus 49–51 cm (19–20 in) Habitat: Forest Diet: Fruit, as well as leaves, flowers, insects, and arthropods	VU Unknown
Red-bellied lemur	E. rubriventer Geoffroy, 1850	Eastern Madagascar	Size: 36–42 cm (14–17 in) long, plus 46–54 cm (18–21 in) tail Habitat: Forest Diet: Flowers, fruits and leaves, as well as invertebrates	VU Unknown
Red-fronted lemur	E. rufifrons Bennett, 1833	Southwestern and southeastern Madagascar	Size: About 30 cm (12 in) long, plus about 50 cm (20 in) tail Habitat: Forest Diet: Fruit, leaves, buds, and flowers, as well as invertebrates	VU Unknown
Sanford's brown lemur	E. sanfordi Archbold, 1932	Northern Madagascar	Size: 38–40 cm (15–16 in) long, plus 50–55 cm (20–22 in) tail Habitat: Forest Diet: Fruit, as well as leaves, flowers, and invertebrates	EN Unknown
White-headed lemur	E. albifrons Geoffroy, 1796	Northeastern Madagascar	Size: About 40 cm (16 in) long, plus about 50 cm (20 in) tail Habitat: Forest Diet: Fruit and flowers	VU Unknown

Genus Hapalemur – Geoffroy, 1851 – five species
Common name	Scientific name and subspecies	Range	Size and ecology	IUCN status and estimated population
Eastern lesser bamboo lemur	H. griseus Link, 1795	Western and eastern Madagascar	Size: 28–30 cm (11–12 in) long, plus 35–37 cm (14–15 in) tail Habitat: Forest Diet: Bamboo, as well as grass, fruit, and leaves	VU Unknown
Golden bamboo lemur	H. aureus Meier, Albignac, Peyriéras, Rumpler, & Wright, 1987	Southeastern Madagascar	Size: About 34 cm (13 in) long, plus about 41 cm (16 in) tail Habitat: Forest and inland wetlands Diet: Bamboo, as well as grass, leaves, fruit, fungi, and soil	CR 50–250
Lac Alaotra bamboo lemur	H. alaotrensis Rumpler, 1975	Northeastern Madagascar	Size: About 40 cm (16 in) long, plus tail Habitat: Inland wetlands Diet: Marsh plants	CR Unknown
Southern lesser bamboo lemur	H. meridionalis Warter, Randrianasolo, Dutrillaux, & Rumpler, 1987	Southeastern Madagascar	Size: 24–30 cm (9–12 in) long, plus 32–40 cm (13–16 in) tail Habitat: Forest Diet: Grass, pith, stems, and leaves, as well as fruit	VU Unknown
Western lesser bamboo lemur	H. occidentalis Rumpler, 1975	Map of range	Size: 27–28 cm (11–11 in) long, plus 36–39 cm (14–15 in) tail Habitat: Forest Diet: Fruit, bamboo, flowers, fungi, and soil	VU Unknown

Genus Lemur – Linnaeus, 1758 – one species
Common name	Scientific name and subspecies	Range	Size and ecology	IUCN status and estimated population
Ring-tailed lemur	L. catta Linnaeus, 1758	Southwestern Madagascar	Size: 39–46 cm (15–18 in) long, plus 56–63 cm (22–25 in) tail Habitat: Forest, shrubland, rocky areas, and caves Diet: Omnivorous, including fruit, leaves, stems, flowers, sap, spiders, spider webs, chameleons, insects, small birds, and termite mounds	EN Unknown

Genus Prolemur – Gray, 1871 – one species
Common name	Scientific name and subspecies	Range	Size and ecology	IUCN status and estimated population
Greater bamboo lemur	P. simus Gray, 1871	Eastern Madagascar	Size: 40–45 cm (16–18 in) long, plus 43–48 cm (17–19 in) tail Habitat: Forest Diet: Bamboo shoots and pith, as well as flowers, leaves, soil, and fruit	CR Unknown

Genus Varecia – Gray, 1863 – two species
Common name	Scientific name and subspecies	Range	Size and ecology	IUCN status and estimated population
Black-and-white ruffed lemur	V. variegata Kerr, 1792 Three subspecies: V. v. editorum (Hill's ruffed lemur); V. v. subcincta (White-belted black-and-white ruffed lemur); V. v. variegata (Black-and-white ruffed lemur)	Eastern Madagascar	Size: About 45 cm (18 in) long, plus 60–61 cm (24–24 in) tail Habitat: Forest Diet: Fruit, as well as leaves, flowers, and nectar	CR Unknown
Red ruffed lemur	V. rubra (Geoffroy, 1812)	Northeastern Madagascar	Size: About 50 cm (20 in) long, plus about 60 cm (24 in) tail Habitat: Forest Diet: Fruit, nectar, and pollen, as well as leaves and seeds	CR Unknown

=== Family Lepilemuridae ===
Genus Lepilemur – Geoffroy, 1851 – 25 species
Common name	Scientific name and subspecies	Range	Size and ecology	IUCN status and estimated population
AEECL's sportive lemur	L. aeeclis Andriaholinirina, Fausser, Roos, Zinner, Thalmann, Rabarivola, Ravoarimanana, Ganzhorn, Meier, Hilgartner, Walter, Zaramody, Langer, Hahn, Zimmermann, Radespiel, Craul, Tomiuk, Tattersall, & Rumpler, 2017	Northern Madagascar	Size: 28–33 cm (11–13 in) long, plus 24–26 cm (9–10 in) tail Habitat: Forest Diet: Leaves	EN Unknown
Ahmanson's sportive lemur	L. ahmansoni Louis Jr., Engberg, Lei, Geng, Sommer, Randriamampionona, Randriamanana, Zaonarivelo, Andriantompohavana, Randria, Prosper, Ramaromilanto, Rakotoarisoa, Rooney, & Brenneman, 2006	Northern Madagascar	Size: 24–30 cm (9–12 in) long, plus 23–25 cm (9–10 in) tail Habitat: Forest Diet: Leaves	CR Unknown
Ankarana sportive lemur	L. ankaranensis Rumpler, 1975	Northeastern Madagascar	Size: About 28 cm (11 in) long, plus about 25 cm (10 in) tail Habitat: Forest Diet: Leaves and fruit, as well as latex	EN Unknown
Betsileo sportive lemur	L. betsileo Louis Jr., Engberg, Lei, Geng, Sommer, Randriamampionona, Randriamanana, Zaonarivelo, Andriantompohavana, Randria, Prosper, Ramaromilanto, Rakotoarisoa, Rooney, & Brenneman, 2006	Eastern Madagascar	Size: About 28 cm (11 in) long, plus about 33 cm (13 in) tail Habitat: Forest Diet: Leaves and flowers	EN Unknown
Daraina sportive lemur	L. milanoii Louis Jr., Engberg, Lei, Geng, Sommer, Randriamampionona, Randriamanana, Zaonarivelo, Andriantompohavana, Randria, Prosper, Ramaromilanto, Rakotoarisoa, Rooney, & Brenneman, 2006	Northeastern Madagascar	Size: 25–29 cm (10–11 in) long, plus 24–27 cm (9–11 in) tail Habitat: Forest Diet: Leaves	EN Unknown
Fleurete's sportive lemur	L. fleuretae Louis Jr., Engberg, Lei, Geng, Sommer, Randriamampionona, Randriamanana, Zaonarivelo, Andriantompohavana, Randria, Prosper, Ramaromilanto, Rakotoarisoa, Rooney, & Brenneman, 2006	Southern Madagascar	Size: 28–37 cm (11–15 in) long, plus about 30 cm (12 in) tail Habitat: Forest Diet: Leaves, fruit, and flowers	EN Unknown
Gray-backed sportive lemur	L. dorsalis Gray, 1870	Northern Madagascar	Size: 23–26 cm (9–10 in) long, plus 26–28 cm (10–11 in) tail Habitat: Forest Diet: Leaves, as well as flowers, fruit, and bark	EN Unknown
Grewcock's sportive lemur	L. grewcocki Louis Jr., Engberg, Lei, Geng, Sommer, Randriamampionona, Randriamanana, Zaonarivelo, Andriantompohavana, Randria, Prosper, Ramaromilanto, Rakotoarisoa, Rooney, & Brenneman, 2006	Northern Madagascar	Size: 29–33 cm (11–13 in) long, plus 26–30 cm (10–12 in) tail Habitat: Forest Diet:	CR Unknown
Hawks' sportive lemur	L. tymerlachsoni Louis Jr., Engberg, Lei, Geng, Sommer, Randriamampionona, Randriamanana, Zaonarivelo, Andriantompohavana, Randria, Prosper, Ramaromilanto, Rakotoarisoa, Rooney, & Brenneman, 2006	Northern Madagascar	Size: 28–41 cm (11–16 in) long, plus 22–27 cm (9–11 in) tail Habitat: Forest Diet: Leaves, as well as fruit and bark	CR Unknown
Holland's sportive lemur	L. hollandorum Ramaromilanto, Lei, Engberg, Johnson, Sitzmann, & Louis Jr., 2009	Northeastern Madagascar	Size: Habitat: Forest Diet: Leaves	CR Unknown
Hubbard's sportive lemur	L. hubbardi Louis Jr., Engberg, Lei, Geng, Sommer, Randriamampionona, Randriamanana, Zaonarivelo, Andriantompohavana, Randria, Prosper, Ramaromilanto, Rakotoarisoa, Rooney, & Brenneman, 2006	Southwestern Madagascar	Size: 28–34 cm (11–13 in) long, plus 23–25 cm (9–10 in) tail Habitat: Forest Diet: Leaves	EN Unknown
James' sportive lemur	L. jamesi Louis Jr., Engberg, Lei, Geng, Sommer, Randriamampionona, Randriamanana, Zaonarivelo, Andriantompohavana, Randria, Prosper, Ramaromilanto, Rakotoarisoa, Rooney, & Brenneman, 2006	Southeastern Madagascar	Size: 32–35 cm (13–14 in) long, plus 28–32 cm (11–13 in) tail Habitat: Forest Diet:	CR Unknown
Milne-Edwards' sportive lemur	L. edwardsi Forsyth Major, 1894	Northern Madagascar	Size: 27–29 cm (11–11 in) long, plus 27–29 cm (11–11 in) tail Habitat: Forest Diet: Leaves, as well as seeds, flowers, and fruit	EN Unknown
Northern sportive lemur	L. septentrionalis Rumpler & Albignac, 1975	Northeastern Madagascar	Size: About 28 cm (11 in) long, plus 25 cm (10 in) tail Habitat: Forest Diet: Leaves, as well as flowers and fruit	CR 40
Otto's sportive lemur	L. otto Craul, Zimmermann, Rasoloharijaona, Randrianambinina, & Radespiel, 2007	Northern Madagascar	Size: Habitat: Forest Diet:	EN Unknown
Petter's sportive lemur	L. petteri Louis Jr., Engberg, Lei, Geng, Sommer, Randriamampionona, Randriamanana, Zaonarivelo, Andriantompohavana, Randria, Prosper, Ramaromilanto, Rakotoarisoa, Rooney, & Brenneman, 2006	Southern Madagascar	Size: 27–29 cm (11–11 in) long, plus 22–25 cm (9–10 in) tail Habitat: Forest Diet: Leaves	EN Unknown
Randrianasolo's sportive lemur	L. randrianasoloi Andriaholinirina, Fausser, Roos, Zinner, Thalmann, Rabarivola, Ravoarimanana, Ganzhorn, Meier, Hilgartner, Walter, Zaramody, Langer, Hahn, Zimmermann, Radespiel, Craul, Tomiuk, Tattersall, & Rumpler, 2017	Western Madagascar	Size: About 29 cm (11 in) long, plus about 28 cm (11 in) tail Habitat: Forest Diet: Leaves, as well as pollen, seeds, fruit, flowers, and bark	EN Unknown
Red-tailed sportive lemur	L. ruficaudatus Grandidier, 1867	Southwestern Madagascar	Size: About 28 cm (11 in) long, plus about 25 cm (10 in) tail Habitat: Forest Diet: Fruit and leaves	CR Unknown
Sahamalaza sportive lemur	L. sahamalaza Andriaholinirina, Fausser, Roos, Zinner, Thalmann, Rabarivola, Ravoarimanana, Ganzhorn, Meier, Hilgartner, Walter, Zaramody, Langer, Hahn, Zimmermann, Radespiel, Craul, Tomiuk, Tattersall, & Rumpler, 2017	Northern Madagascar	Size: About 26 cm (10 in) long, plus about 27 cm (11 in) tail Habitat: Forest Diet: Leaves, fruit, spiders, and insects	CR Unknown
Scott's sportive lemur	L. scottorum Lei, Engberg, Andriantompohavana, McGuire, Mittermeier, Zaonarivelo, Brenneman, & Louis Jr., 2008	Northeastern Madagascar	Size: 31–35 cm (12–14 in) long, plus 25–30 cm (10–12 in) tail Habitat: Forest Diet: Leaves	EN Unknown
Seal's sportive lemur	L. seali Louis Jr., Engberg, Lei, Geng, Sommer, Randriamampionona, Randriamanana, Zaonarivelo, Andriantompohavana, Randria, Prosper, Ramaromilanto, Rakotoarisoa, Rooney, & Brenneman, 2006	Northeastern Madagascar	Size: 32–38 cm (13–15 in) long, plus 24–38 cm (9–15 in) tail Habitat: Forest Diet:	VU Unknown
Small-toothed sportive lemur	L. microdon Forsyth Major, 1894	Map of range	Size: 27–32 cm (11–13 in) long, plus 28–32 cm (11–13 in) tail Habitat: Forest Diet: Leaves	EN Unknown
Weasel sportive lemur	L. mustelinus Geoffroy, 1851	Eastern Madagascar	Size: 24–30 cm (9–12 in) long, plus 22–29 cm (9–11 in) tail Habitat: Forest Diet: Leaves, as well as fruit, flowers, and bark	VU Unknown
White-footed sportive lemur	L. leucopus Forsyth Major, 1894	Southern Madagascar	Size: 24–26 cm (9–10 in) long, plus 21–26 cm (8–10 in) tail Habitat: Forest Diet: Leaves and vines, as well as flowers and fruit	EN Unknown
Wright's sportive lemur	L. wrighti Louis Jr., Engberg, Lei, Geng, Sommer, Randriamampionona, Randriamanana, Zaonarivelo, Andriantompohavana, Randria, Prosper, Ramaromilanto, Rakotoarisoa, Rooney, & Brenneman, 2006	Southern Madagascar	Size: 31–38 cm (12–15 in) long, plus 23–28 cm (9–11 in) tail Habitat: Forest Diet: Leaves	EN 2,000

== Extinct species ==
All known extinct lemurs from Madagascar are known from recent, subfossil remains. Conditions for fossilization were not ideal on the island, so little is known about ancestral lemur populations. All known extinct lemurs are thought to have died out after the arrival of humans.

Extinct species
Scientific name	Common name	Family	Estimated size	Extinction date	References
Archaeoindris fontoynonti	Sloth lemurs	Palaeopropithecidae	160–200 kg (350–440 lb)	350 BCE	
Archaeolemur edwardsi	Monkey lemurs (or baboon lemurs)	Archaeolemuridae	15–25 kg (33–55 lb)	1047–1280 CE	
Archaeolemur majori	Monkey lemurs (or baboon lemurs)	Archaeolemuridae	15–25 kg (33–55 lb)	1047–1280 CE	
Babakotia radofilai	Sloth lemurs	Palaeopropithecidae	16–20 kg (35–44 lb)	3050 BCE^{[c]}	
Daubentonia robusta	Giant aye-aye	Daubentoniidae	14 kg (31 lb)	891–1027 CE	
Hadropithecus stenognathus	Monkey lemurs (or baboon lemurs)	Archaeolemuridae	27–35 kg (60–77 lb)	444–772 CE	
Megaladapis edwardsi	Koala lemurs	Megaladapidae	40–80 kg (88–176 lb)	1280–1420 CE	
Megaladapis grandidieri	Koala lemurs	Megaladapidae	40–80 kg (88–176 lb)	1280–1420 CE	
Megaladapis madagascariensis	Koala lemurs	Megaladapidae	40–80 kg (88–176 lb)	1280–1420 CE	
Mesopropithecus dolichobrachion	Sloth lemurs	Palaeopropithecidae	10–14 kg (22–31 lb)	245–429 CE	
Mesopropithecus globiceps	Sloth lemurs	Palaeopropithecidae	10–14 kg (22–31 lb)	245–429 CE	
Mesopropithecus pithecoides	Sloth lemurs	Palaeopropithecidae	10–14 kg (22–31 lb)	245–429 CE	
Pachylemur insignis	Pachylemur	Lemuridae	11.5 kg (25 lb)	680–960 BCE	
Pachylemur jullyi	Pachylemur	Lemuridae	13 kg (29 lb)	Holocene	
Palaeopropithecus ingens	Sloth lemurs	Palaeopropithecidae	25–50 kg (55–110 lb)	1300–1620 CE	
Palaeopropithecus kelyus	Sloth lemurs	Palaeopropithecidae	35 kg (77 lb)	Late Quaternary	
Palaeopropithecus maximus	Sloth lemurs	Palaeopropithecidae	25–50 kg (55–110 lb)	1300–1620 CE	

== See also ==
- List of mammals of Madagascar
- List of primates

== Sources ==
- Burnie, David; Wilson, Don E., eds. (2017). Animal: The Definitive Visual Guide. DK. ISBN 978-1-4654-7086-7.
- Garbutt, Nick (2007). Mammals of Madagascar: A Complete Guide. A & C Black. ISBN 978-0-300-12550-4.
- Nowak, Ronald M. (1999). Walker's Primates of the World. Johns Hopkins University Press. ISBN 978-0-8018-6251-9.
- Mittermeier, R. A.; Louis, E. E.; Richardson, M.; Schwitzer, C.; et al. (2010). Lemurs of Madagascar. Illustrated by S.D. Nash (3rd ed.). Conservation International. ISBN 978-1-934151-23-5.
- Godfrey, L. R.; Jungers, W. L.; Burney, D. A. (2010). "Chapter 21: Subfossil Lemurs of Madagascar". In Werdelin, L.; Sanders, W.J (eds.). Cenozoic Mammals of Africa. University of California Press. ISBN 978-0-520-25721-4.
- Groves, Colin P. (2005). Wilson, Don E.; Reeder, DeeAnn M. (eds.). Mammal Species of the World. Vol. 1 (3rd ed.). Johns Hopkins University Press. ISBN 978-0-8018-8221-0.
