= Sibree =

Sibree is a surname. Notable people with the surname include:

- Ernest Sibree (1859–1927), English Egyptologist and linguist
- James Sibree (1836–1929), English missionary in Madagascar
- Prue Sibree (born 1946), Australian politician
