= Marohita mouse lemur =

Conservation status
- Critically Endangered (IUCN 3.1)
- CITES Appendix I

Scientific classification
- Kingdom: Animalia
- Phylum: Chordata
- Class: Mammalia
- Infraclass: Placentalia
- Order: Primates
- Suborder: Strepsirrhini
- Family: Cheirogaleidae
- Genus: Microcebus
- Species: M. marohita

Binomial name
- Microcebus marohita Rasoloarison et al., 2013
- Distribution of M. marohita

Species of lemur

The Marohita mouse lemur (Microcebus marohita) is a species of mouse lemur known only from the Marohita Forest in eastern Madagascar, near the village of Marolambo. Specimens were first collected in December 2003, and its discovery was announced in 2013 along with the Anosy mouse lemur (Microcebus tanosi). It is a large mouse lemur, weighing up to 89 g (3.1 oz), and lives within the same area as the Goodman's mouse lemur (M. lehilahytsara), Simmons' mouse lemur (M. simmonsi), and the brown mouse lemur (M. rufus), all four of which are nearly identical in appearance. Its fur is rufous on its back and grayish-beige on its underside. Nothing is known about its behavior. Its conservation status was evaluated as Endangered by the International Union for Conservation of Nature (IUCN) in 2012, before it was formally described, because its only known habitat had severely degraded between 2003 and 2012.

== Taxonomy and phylogeny ==
The first specimens of Marohita mouse lemur (Microcebus marohita) were collected by biologist Rodin Rasoloarison during field work in December 2003. At the time, he captured three mouse lemurs at Marohita Forest in the Toamasina Province of eastern Madagascar, near the village of Marolambo. These were prepared as biological specimens, including skins, skulls, and tissue samples, with the required permits from the government of Madagascar. The Marohita mouse lemur was described concurrently with the Anosy mouse lemur (Microcebus tanosi) in 2013 by Rasoloarison and researchers David Weisrock, Anne Yoder, Daniel Rakotondravony, and Peter M. Kappeler using molecular analysis. The Marohita mouse lemur belongs to the genus Microcebus within the family Cheirogaleidae. The holotype was collected on 2 December 2003 at Marohita Forest. Its species name, marohita, refers to the forest in which it was found and means "many views" in the Malagasy language.

Despite living near the Goodman's mouse lemur (M. lehilahytsara), Simmons' mouse lemur (M. simmonsi), and the brown mouse lemur (M. rufus), Rasoloarison et al. reported no indications of gene flow between these four sympatric species. The population at Marohita Forest is considered a distinct species using the metapopulation lineage concept of species. It is nearly identical in appearance to the other eastern mouse lemurs, which are known for being cryptic species.

== Physical description ==
The back coat of the Marohita mouse lemur is rufous and has a mid-dorsal stripe that is difficult to discern. The fur on the underside is grayish-beige, while the underfur is dark gray. Its total body length averages 275–286 mm (10.8–11.3 in) with the tail measuring 133–145 mm (5.2–5.7 in), roughly half of its body length. It has short ears, measuring 18–19 mm (0.71–0.75 in), and long hind feet, measuring 34–35 mm (1.3–1.4 in).

The Marohita mouse lemur is an exceptionally large mouse lemur, weighing up to 89 g (3.1 oz). The subadult male Marohita mouse lemur that was collected was as large as the largest known male mouse lemur, a Gerp's mouse lemur (M. gerpi) adult male. The female Marohita mouse lemurs were 20% heavier than the heaviest female mouse lemurs, which belonged to the Simmons' mouse lemur and Gerp's mouse lemur species.

== Behavior ==
No data are available concerning the behavior, communication, ecology, or reproduction of the Marohita mouse lemur.

== Distribution and habitat ==
The Marohita mouse lemur has only been found in the Marohita Forest, located within the more extensive Marolambo Forest. Its distribution outside of Marohita Forest is unknown. Four other mouse lemur species have been found nearby: the highland species, Goodman's mouse lemur, and the lowland species, Gerp's mouse lemur, both described less than ten years earlier, are found north of the Mangoro River, while Jolly's mouse lemur (M. jollyae) and the brown mouse lemur are found south of Marolambo.

== Conservation status ==
Due to extensive habitat degradation within Marohita Forest between 2003 and 2012, the International Union for Conservation of Nature (IUCN) evaluated the Marohita mouse lemur as Endangered at a workshop for the IUCN Red List held at Madagascar's capital, Antananarivo, in July 2012, nearly a year prior to the publication of its formal description. This was updated to Critically Endangered in 2014.
