= Daniel Lambert (disambiguation) =

Daniel Lambert (1770–1809) was a jail keeper and animal breeder known for his large size.

Daniel Lambert may also refer to:

- Daniel Lambert (Lord Mayor of London), Lord Mayor of London in 1741
- Daniel Lambert (rugby union) (1883-1915), English rugby union player
- Daniel Lambert (ice hockey) (born 1970), Canadian ice hockey player
- Dan Lambert, founder of American Top Team
