= Lavasoa dwarf lemur =

Conservation status
- Endangered (IUCN 3.1)
- CITES Appendix I

Scientific classification
- Kingdom: Animalia
- Phylum: Chordata
- Class: Mammalia
- Order: Primates
- Suborder: Strepsirrhini
- Family: Cheirogaleidae
- Genus: Cheirogaleus
- Species: C. lavasoensis

Binomial name
- Cheirogaleus lavasoensis Thiele et al., 2013

Species of lemur

The Lavasoa dwarf lemur (Cheirogaleus lavasoensis) is a small, nocturnal strepsirrhine primate and a species of lemur that is endemic to three small, isolated patches of forest on the southern slopes of the Lavasoa Mountains in southern Madagascar. Fewer than 50 individuals are thought to exist. Its habitat lies in a transitional zone between three ecoregions: dry spiny bush, humid littoral forest, and humid forest. First collected in 2001 and thought to be a subpopulation of the furry-eared dwarf lemur (C. crossleyi), it was not formally described until 2013. It is one of six species of dwarf lemur, though the research that identified it also suggested the existence of many more new species.

== Taxonomic history ==
The Lavasoa dwarf lemur belongs to the genus Cheirogaleus (dwarf lemurs) within the family Cheirogaleidae. Between October 2001 and December 2006, researchers collected ten mature adults (five male and five female) along with six immature individuals. The lemurs were released after they were measured and small tissue samples were taken from their ears. The holotype (AH-X-00-181) was an adult male, captured, recorded, and released at Petit Lavasoa on 10 October 2001. The analysis was published in 2013 by Dana Thiele and Andreas Hapke of Johannes Gutenberg University and Emilienne Razafimahatratra of the University of Antananarivo.

In the two decades prior to 2013, only two dwarf lemur species were known, but in 2000 primatologist Colin Groves raised the number to seven based on morphological data acquired from museum samples. However, in 2009 and 2011, two of these new species were rejected. The Lavasoa dwarf lemur, named for the Lavasoa Mountains in southern Madagascar, became the sixth known species in 2013 when it was differentiated from the furry-eared dwarf lemur (C. crossleyi) through analyses of mitochondrial and nuclear material performed by a team of German and Malagasy researchers. Furthermore, their research suggested the existence of three more new dwarf lemur species that they provisionally named Cheirogaleus sp. Ranomafana Andrambovato, Cheirogaleus sp. Bekaraoka Sambava, and Cheirogaleus sp. Ambanja, based on the regions the samples were collected. The Lavasoa dwarf lemur is most closely related to C. sp. Ranomafana/Andrambovato. The authors speculated that even greater species diversity may be found among dwarf lemurs by future studies due to their large geographic range and the great genetic distance exhibited within the genus.

== Description ==
The Lavasoa dwarf lemur is a small lemur, weighing 0.3 kg (0.66 lb) and measuring 50–55 cm (20–22 in) in length. Its eyes are surrounded by black fur that forms a 3–4 mm (0.12–0.16 in) ring around the eyes. The black fur runs from the eyes to the animal's pointed nose. The rest of the fur on its head is reddish-brown, except for a thin strip between the eyes which is lighter in color. The back of the Lavasoa dwarf lemur is reddish-brown at the neck which fades to gray-brown at the posterior end. The underside of the lemur is a cream color. Hands and feet are grey-brown in most individuals, but reddish-brown in a minority. Throughout the animal exhibits dichromatic hairs with gray bases.

The Lavasoa dwarf lemur can be distinguished from the furry-eared dwarf lemur by its wider ears and smaller head. It can be distinguished from its closest relative, Cheirogaleus sp. Ranomafana Andrambovato, by these two traits plus a shorter tail. The coloration patterns are very similar between all three species. This coloration pattern contrasts with Lavasoa dwarf lemur's closest geographic neighbors, the greater dwarf lemur (C. major) and the fat-tailed dwarf lemur (C. medius).

== Behavior ==
Like other dwarf lemurs, the Lavasoa dwarf lemur is nocturnal and arboreal, living in the upper canopy of the forest. During the dry winter, they hibernate for several months. Little is known about their behavior because they are primarily active during the rainy season, at which time the forests become challenging for scientists to reach.

== Distribution and habitat ==
The Lavasoa dwarf lemur is endemic to the southern slopes of the Lavasoa Mountains in the Anosy Region of Madagascar. It is only found in three small fragmentary forests (Grand Lavasoa, Petit Lavasoa, and Ambatotsirongorongo), located within a transitional zone between dry spiny bush, humid littoral forest, and humid forest. Despite containing some flora from the drier regions, its habitat general resembles humid forests.

== Conservation status ==
The three forest fragments in which the Lavasoa dwarf lemur is found used to be a part of a larger forest that once covered the southern range of the Lavasoa Mountains, as illustrated by aerial photographs from 1957. These remaining forest fragments are contained within a new protected area around Ambatotsirongorongo (Nouvelle Aire Protégée Ambatotsirongorongo), which is part of the national service of protected areas (Système des Aires Protégées de Madagascar, SAPM). Thiele et al. estimated that 50, maybe fewer, Lavasoa dwarf lemurs live within this range.
