= Douglas Lambert =

England international rugby union player

- Born: 4 October 1883 Cranbook, Kent, England
- Died: 13 October 1915 (aged 32) Loos-en-Gohelle, France
- School: Eastbourne College

Rugby union career
- Position: Wing
Senior career
Years	Team	Apps	(Points)
1905–1914	Harlequins		
International career
Years	Team	Apps	(Points)
1907–1911	England	7	(46)
- Military career
- Allegiance: United Kingdom
- Branch: British Army
- Unit: Buffs (East Kent Regiment)
- Conflicts: World War I; Battle of Loos
- Memorials: Loos Memorial

Douglas "Dan'l" Lambert (4 October 1883 – 13 October 1915) was an English rugby union footballer for Harlequins, England, and the Barbarians. He won 7 caps for England between 1907 and 1911, notably scoring 5 tries on debut against France (not bettered until 1995), and 22 points in another match against France. Lambert was all round sportsman: he was a scratch golfer, played football (soccer) for Corinthian–Casuals, and kept wicket (cricket) for Hertfordshire. He was killed in action at the Battle of Loos on 13 October 1915.

== Early life ==
Douglas Lambert was born on 4 October 1883 (Note: McCrery gives his date of birth as 14 October 1883.) in Cranbrook. He went to school at St Edward's in Oxford and then Eastbourne College.

== Rugby career ==
Lambert, standing 6'4", was big, strong and fast, and played for Harlequins A XV until he was selected to play wing for the first team in 1905. Being large, he joined as a forward. Adrian Stoop, who had been selected for Harlequins in 1901 while still at school at Rugby, was appointed club secretary in 1905 and was captain the following year. He brought about a transformation at the club, attracting exceptional back line players such as John Birkett, Ronnie Poulton, Herbert Sibree and Lambert: Harlequins became the leading club in England. It was Stoop who brought Lambert into the first team as a threequarter after Lambert had demonstrated his speed and strength by tackling Stoop in practice. After his first season with the first team, Lambert was invited on the Barbarians' Easter tour of Wales in 1906, but he was on the losing side in the three matches in which he played, against Penarth, Cardiff and Plymouth.

Lambert's debut for England was against France in January 1907. Selected to play on the wing only after the original choice had pulled out, Lambert scored five tries, a record for any nation, which stood until Marc Ellis scored six tries for New Zealand against Japan in the 1995 Rugby World Cup. Lambert was subsequently dropped from the England team for the remainder of the season. In the meantime, he continued to play for Harlequins and was again invited to tour with the Barbarians, winning two of the three matches.

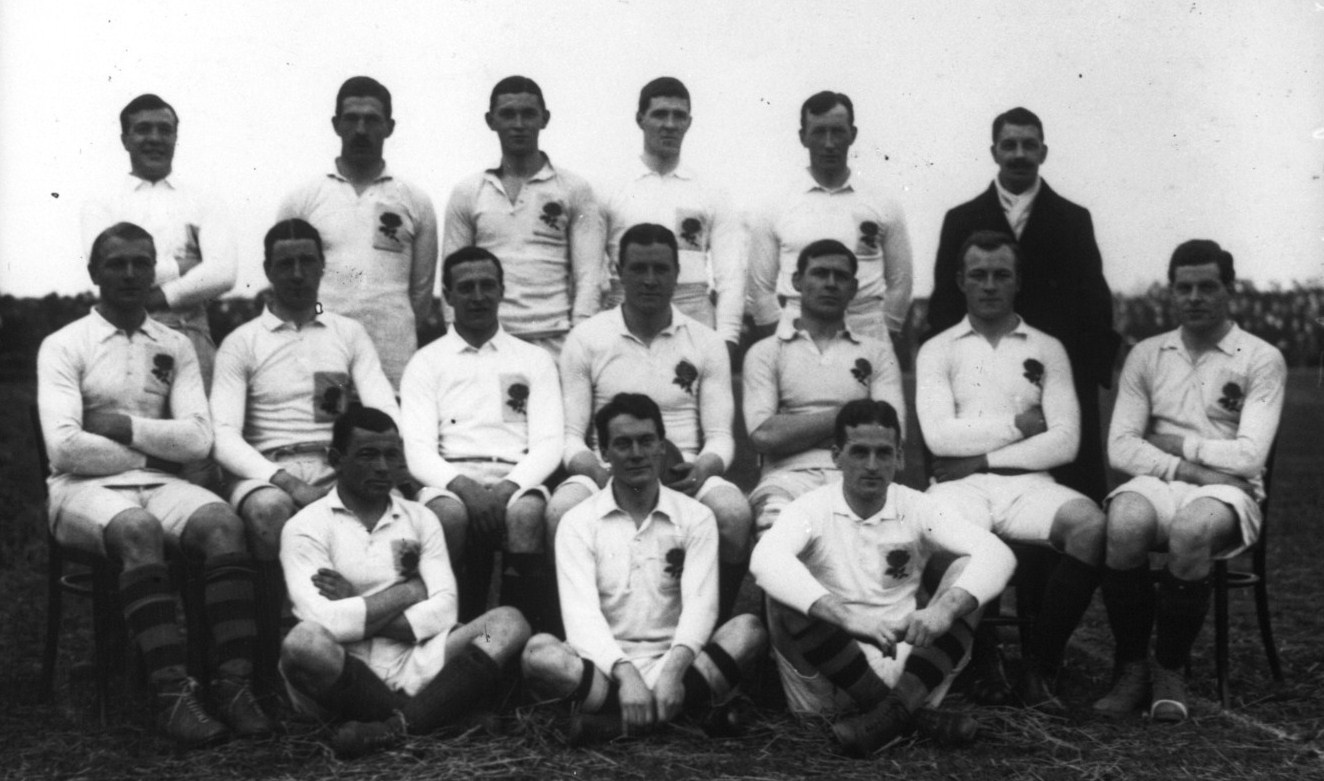
The England team for the England-France match on 28 January 1911

In 1908, Lambert was the first choice for left wing. He played against Wales (18 January), France (28 January) and was selected to play against Ireland on 8 February (at Richmond) but missed the game having been injured in a club match a few days before. He returned to the England team for the final match against Scotland (21 March). Lambert did not play for England during either the 1909 or 1910 international seasons, but in 1911 he was recalled and played three matches. In the game against Wales (21 January) he scored a single try. In the next game, however, against France (28 January), Lambert scored an unprecedented 22 points, a record for England that stood until 1990 when Simon Hodgkinson scored 23 points against Argentina. Yet Lambert's tally of two tries, five conversions and two penalties that earned him 22 points in 1911, would have scored 24 points in 1990 and 26 points in 1991. The game against France was also noteworthy for being England's first at its new home ground of Twickenham., Four of the England backline that day were Harlequins players: John Birkett, who captained England, Adrian Stoop and his brother Frank, as well as Douglas Lambert.

Lambert appeared for England for the last time against Ireland (11 February 1911) at Lansdowne Road. He was dropped for England's final game against Scotland. According to contemporary newspapers, Lambert was out of form during the first part of 1911-1912. The "hammer of the French" was nevertheless recalled to the England team for final match of the championship against France on 7 April 1912. Although selected, after arriving in Paris he suffered an injury and consequently did not play. Lambert remained unable to play for most of the following season. Not until the end of 1913 did he at last fully recover his fitness and his form. In January 1914, Lambert was back in favor with the England selectors, though picked only as the reserve three-quarter. In what proved to be his last Rugby game (for Harlequins against the United Services on 18 April 1914) he ran in 6 tries and kicked 3 conversions.

=== International appearances ===
Opposition	Score	Result	Date	Venue	Ref(s)
France	41–13	Won	5 Jan 1907	Richmond	
France	0–19	Won	1 Jan 1908	Colombes	
Wales	18–28	Lost	18 Jan 1908	Bristol	
Scotland	16–10	Lost	21 Mar 1908	Inverleith	
Wales	15–11	Lost	21 Jan 1911	Swansea	
France	37–0	Won	28 Jan 1911	Twickenham	
Ireland	3–0	Lost	11 Feb 1911	Lansdowne Road	

== Military service ==
At the outbreak of the First World War in August 1914, Lambert volunteered for service with the British Army and on 23 November 1914 was commissioned as a second lieutenant in the 6th (Service) Battalion of the Buffs (East Kent Regiment), assigned to the 12th (Eastern) Division. Before departing for France he was married to Joyce, his childhood girlfriend, and she fell pregnant. His battalion took part in the Battle of Loos in September 1915. On 13 October, in an attempt to break through German lines, Lambert’s battalion was decimated, losing more than 400 men in just a few minutes, Lambert amongst them. Two months after his death, his son was born.

== See also ==
- List of international rugby union players killed in action during the First World War
