= Ernest Sibree =

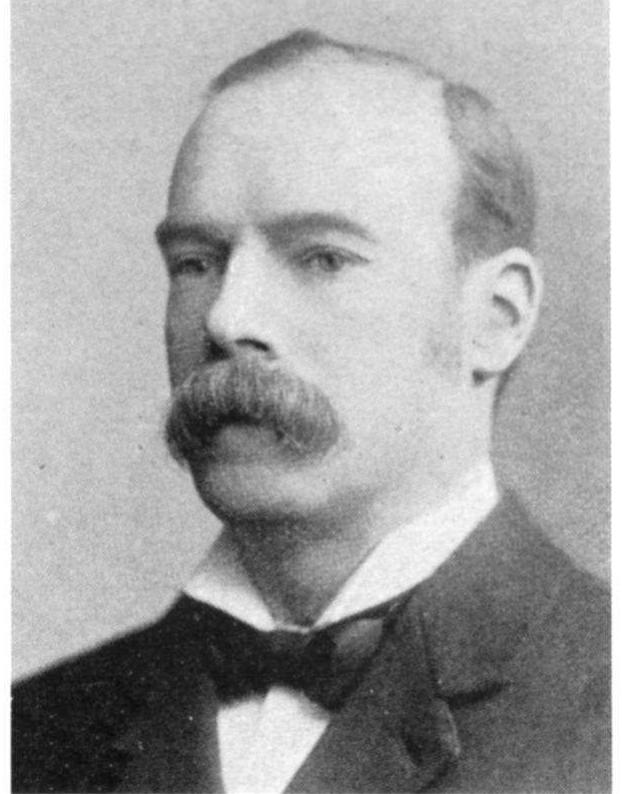
Sibree c. 1895

Ernest Sibree (2 January 1859 – 29 March 1927) was a British Egyptologist and a linguist who dealt with several languages at the University of Bristol. He was the first to offer classes in Ancient Egyptian in Bristol. He was a cousin of the Madagascar missionary James Sibree.

== Life and work ==
Sibree was born in Painswick, Gloucestershire, son of John (1823-1909) and Anna Cash (1823-1912). His grandfather Reverend John (1795-1877) was a congregational minister in Frome and was a friend of George Eliot. John junior had moved to Painswick to become a schoolmaster and later served also as a Justice of the Peace. He was also a translator (translating Hegel's history of philosophy from German) and a poet. Ernest went to the school where his father worked before going to the University of Bonn in 1876. He then attended some classes at University College London but matriculated in 1883 from Oxford. He received a BA (1887) and MA (1890) and joined as an assistant keeper at the Indian Institute in Oxford taking care of the library and museum. The instituted had been begun two years earlier in 1886 and was involved in training candidates of the Indian Civil Service. He married Kate Budgett in 1896 and they moved to live in Redland, Bristol. He became a lecturer in Oriental Languages at the University College, Bristol. Sibree taught Coptic, Sanskrit and Arabic. He also taught elementary Egyptian and his evening class students included Gerald Avery Wainwright and Ernest Mackay. Sibree was involved in helping Wainwright make a trip to Egypt in 1906. In 1901 he was also an honorary librarian at the University. From 1902 he taught Assyrian instead of Sanskrit. Sibree copied and worked on the hieroglyphic texts in the Bristol Museum. In 1905 Louis Allan Goss joined as a reader in Burmese and Sibree was made lecturer in Egyptian and Assyrian. De Lacy Evans O'Leary was involved in oriental language teaching for churches. In 1909 the University of Bristol was established and Sibree became lecturer of oriental languages and headed the department. O'Leary taught Aramaic and Syriac while Jacob taught Hindustani and Marathi. Sibree also took an interest in the Welsh language and together with his wife they travelled and improved his command on the language. In 1921 he was made lecturer in comparative philology. He died suddenly at home and was cremated at Golders Green, London. His wife lived just a few months more.
