= Herbert Sibree =

England international rugby union player

Herbert Sibree MC
- Full name: Herbert John Hyde Sibree
- Born: 9 May 1885 Antananarivo, Madagascar
- Died: 20 August 1962 (aged 77) Ticehurst, Sussex, England
- Notable relative: James Sibree (father)

Rugby union career
- Position: Scrum-half
International career
Years	Team	Apps	(Points)
1908–09	England	3	(0)

Herbert John Hyde Sibree (9 May 1885 – 20 August 1962) was an English rugby union player.

Born in Antananarivo, Madagascar, Sibree was the youngest son of the missionary James Sibree.

Sibree, a scrum-half, started playing first-class rugby with Court Hill in 1903–04 and then joined Kensington. When the Kensington club folded, Sibree joined Harlequins, where he was mentored by England halfback Adrian Stoop. He earned three England caps himself across 1908 and 1909.

In World War I, Sibree served with the Artists Rifles in France and after receiving a commission, he was gazetted to the Norfolk Regiment, gaining promotion to captain in 1916. He was subsequently awarded a Military Cross for gallantry, having led his company under machine-gun fire while wounded. He also received recognition for leading his company in the capture of 100 prisoners.

== See also ==
- List of England national rugby union players
