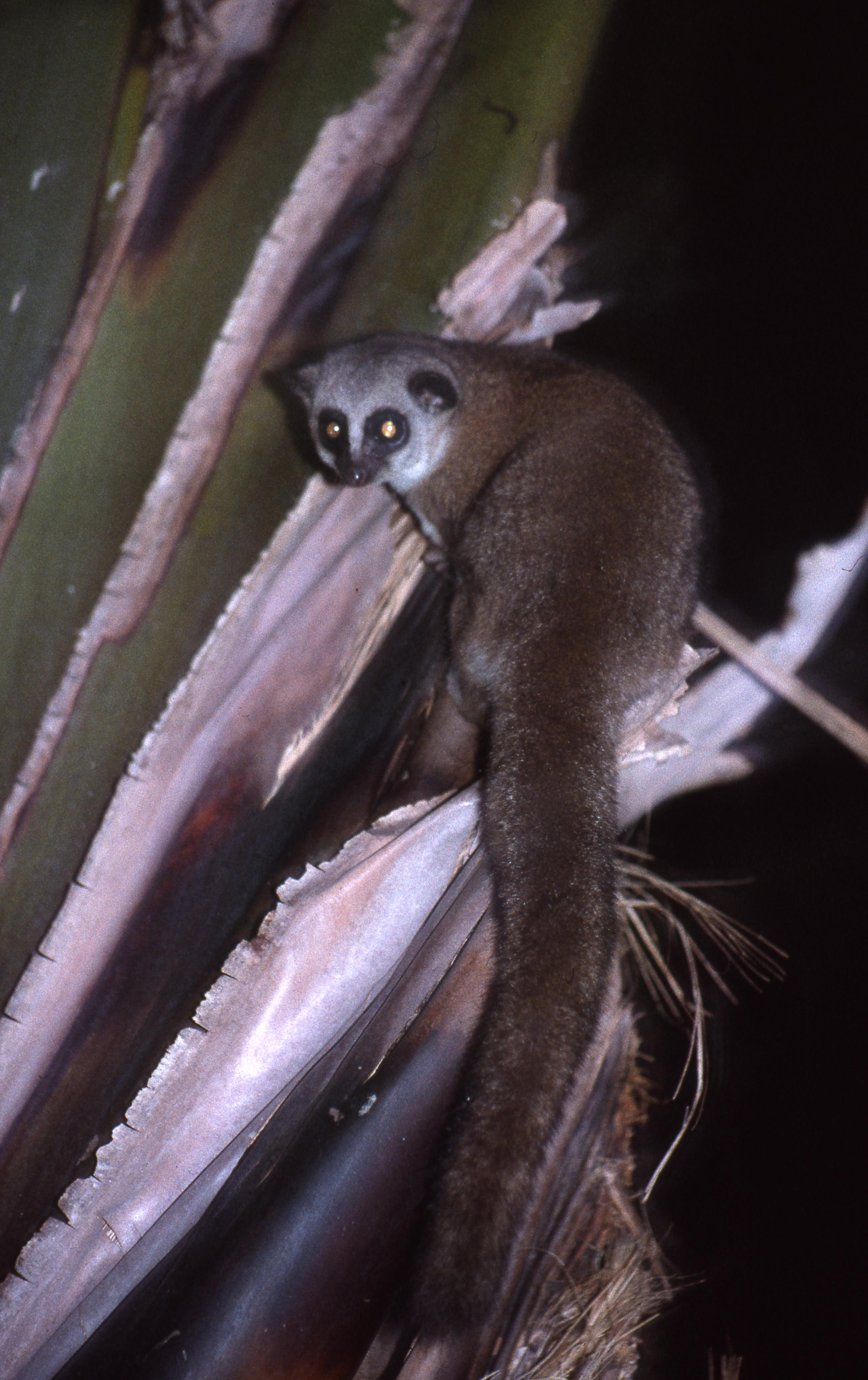
- Greater dwarf lemur (Cheirogaleus major)

Conservation status
- CITES Appendix I

Scientific classification
- Kingdom: Animalia
- Phylum: Chordata
- Class: Mammalia
- Order: Primates
- Family: Cheirogaleidae
- Genus: Cheirogaleus; É. Geoffroy, 1812

Type species
- Cheirogaleus major É. Geoffroy, 1812

Species
- Cheirogaleus medius; Cheirogaleus major; Cheirogaleus crossleyi; Cheirogaleus grovesi; Cheirogaleus minusculus; Cheirogaleus sibreei; Cheirogaleus lavasoensis; Cheirogaleus andysabini; Cheirogaleus shethi; Cheirogaleus thomasi

Synonyms
- Cebugale Lesson, 1840; Mioxocebus, Lesson, 1840; Chirogale Gloger, 1841; Myspithecus, F. Cuvier, 1842; Opolemur Gray, 1872; Altililemur Elliot, 1913; Altilemur Weber, 1928

= Dwarf lemur =

Dwarf lemurs

Genus of lemurs

The dwarf lemurs are the lemurs of the genus Cheirogaleus. All of the species in this genus, like all other lemurs, are native to Madagascar.

== Description ==
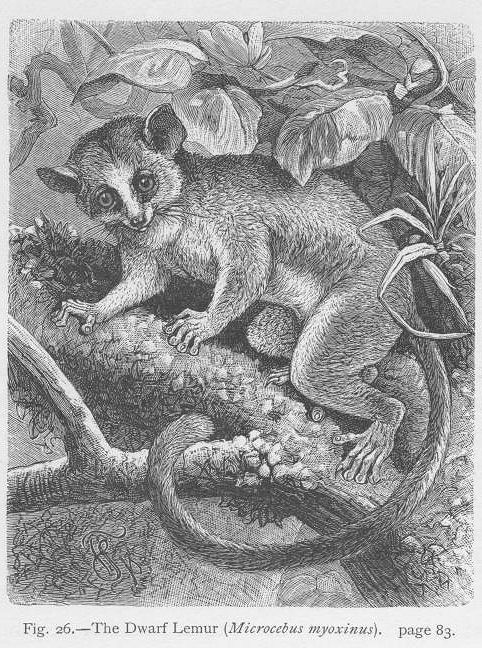
A lithograph of a dwarf lemur from Carl Vogt and Friedrich Specht's The Natural History of Animals (1888)

Measuring 19–27 cm (7.5–10.6 in) in body length with a tail about 16–17 cm (6.3–6.7 in), they are larger than the mouse lemur but smaller than the gentle lemur. Their heads are globular compared to the fox-like heads of the lemurs, but their muzzles are more pointed than those of the hapalemurs. Their hind limbs are slightly longer than their forelimbs, but not as elongated as in lepilemurs or indriids. Dwarf lemurs have an intermembral index of 71 on average. In contrast to most other primates, their grip is similar to that of South American monkeys with objects picked up and branches grasped between the second and third fingers, rather than between the thumb and index finger. Their nails are somewhat keeled and pointed.

Dwarf lemurs roam the lower strata of the foliage in the coastal forests of eastern Madagascar. They are nocturnal and quadrupeds. They have a period of inactivity (torpor) during the winter season lasting between four and five months. Their tail serves as an area for fat storage, most of which is consumed during periods of food scarcity. Like most nocturnal prosimians, dwarf lemurs are reported as living solitary or in pairs. They nest in tree holes where they often sleep together in curled up positions. Their territories are marked by fecal and scent markings. Their diet consists primarily of fruits and flowers and they seem to play a part in the pollination of certain plants.

== Classification ==
As of 2022, 10 species are known.

- Genus Cheirogaleus: dwarf lemurs
  - Montagne d'Ambre dwarf lemur, Cheirogaleus andysabini
  - Furry-eared dwarf lemur, Cheirogaleus crossleyi
  - Groves' dwarf lemur, Cheirogaleus grovesi
  - Lavasoa dwarf lemur, Cheirogaleus lavasoensis
  - Greater dwarf lemur, Cheirogaleus major
  - Fat-tailed dwarf lemur, Cheirogaleus medius
  - Lesser iron-gray dwarf lemur, Cheirogaleus minusculus
  - Ankarana dwarf lemur, Cheirogaleus shethi
  - Sibree's dwarf lemur, Cheirogaleus sibreei
  - Thomas' dwarf lemur, Cheirogaleus thomasi

== See also ==
- List of lemur species
- List of mammals of Madagascar
