= Anosy mouse lemur =

Conservation status
- Endangered (IUCN 3.1)
- CITES Appendix I

Scientific classification
- Kingdom: Animalia
- Phylum: Chordata
- Class: Mammalia
- Infraclass: Placentalia
- Order: Primates
- Suborder: Strepsirrhini
- Family: Cheirogaleidae
- Genus: Microcebus
- Species: M. tanosi

Binomial name
- Microcebus tanosi Rasoloarison et al., 2013

Species of lemur

The Anosy mouse lemur (Microcebus tanosi) is a species of mouse lemur known only from the Manantantely Forest and Ivorona Forest in southeastern Madagascar, near Tôlanaro. Specimens were first collected in April 2007, and its discovery was announced in 2013 along with the Marohita mouse lemur (Microcebus marohita). It is a relatively large mouse lemur and lives in the same region as the gray mouse lemur (M. murinus) and the reddish-gray mouse lemur (M. griseorufus), all three of which are found within 10 km (6.2 mi) of each other and are nearly identical in appearance. It has dark brownish fur on its back and light-colored fur on its underside. Nothing is known about its behavior. Its conservation status has not been evaluated by the International Union for Conservation of Nature (IUCN), although its known habitat has degraded since 2007.

== Taxonomy and phylogeny ==
The first specimens of Anosy mouse lemur (Microcebus tanosi) were collected by biologist Rodin Rasoloarison during field work in April 2007. At the time, he captured six mouse lemurs at Manantantely Forest and four at Ivorona Forest in the Anosy Region of southeastern Madagascar, near the city of Tôlanaro. Of these captured individuals, four were prepared as biological specimens, including skins, skulls, and tissue samples, with the required permits from the government of Madagascar. The Anosy mouse lemur was described concurrently with the Marohita mouse lemur (Microcebus marohita) in 2013 by Rasoloarison and researchers David Weisrock, Anne Yoder, Daniel Rakotondravony, and Peter M. Kappeler using molecular analysis. The Anosy mouse lemur belongs to the genus Microcebus within the family Cheirogaleidae. The holotype was collected on 1 April 2007 at Manantantely Forest. Its species name, tanosi, means "from the Anosy Region" in the Malagasy language.

Despite living in the same region as the gray mouse lemur (M. murinus) and the reddish-gray mouse lemur (M. griseorufus), within 10 km (6.2 mi), Rasoloarison et al. reported no indications of gene flow between these three sympatric species. The populations at Manantantely and Ivorona are considered a distinct species using the metapopulation lineage concept of species. M. tanosi is nearly identical in appearance to the other eastern mouse lemurs, which are known for being a complex of cryptic species.

== Physical description ==
The Anosy mouse lemur has dark brownish fur on its back and dull beige and dark gray fur on its underside. A dark stripe runs from its middle back to its tail and is most visible along the middle of its back. Its head has reddish fur. Compared to other mouse lemurs, it is large, with a total length of 255–275 mm (10.0–10.8 in), with the tail measuring 115–150 mm (4.5–5.9 in), roughly half of its body length.

== Behavior ==
No data are available concerning the behavior, communication, ecology, or reproduction of the Anosy mouse lemur.

== Distribution and habitat ==
The Anosy mouse lemur has only been found in the forests of Manantantely and Ivorona in southeastern Madagascar.

== Conservation status ==
Unlike the Marohita mouse lemur, which was evaluated as Endangered by the International Union for Conservation of Nature (IUCN) in July 2012, the Anosy mouse lemur has not been evaluated. Due to extensive habitat degradation at the Manantantely Forest and slight degradation at the Ivorona Forest, Rasoloarison et al. speculated that this species will likely be listed as Endangered on the IUCN Red List as well. The team stressed the need for further field studies to determine its geographic range and population status in order to facilitate conservation.
