= Thomas' dwarf lemur =

Conservation status
- Endangered (IUCN 3.1)

Scientific classification
- Kingdom: Animalia
- Phylum: Chordata
- Class: Mammalia
- Order: Primates
- Suborder: Strepsirrhini
- Family: Cheirogaleidae
- Genus: Cheirogaleus
- Species: C. thomasi

Binomial name
- Cheirogaleus thomasi (Forsyth Major, 1894)

Species of lemur

The Thomas' dwarf lemur (Cheirogaleus thomasi) is a species of dwarf lemur known only from Anosy, Madagascar. It lives in forested regions along the coast.
