= Lesser iron-gray dwarf lemur =

Conservation status
- Data Deficient (IUCN 3.1)
- CITES Appendix I

Scientific classification
- Kingdom: Animalia
- Phylum: Chordata
- Class: Mammalia
- Infraclass: Placentalia
- Order: Primates
- Suborder: Strepsirrhini
- Family: Cheirogaleidae
- Genus: Cheirogaleus
- Species: C. minusculus

Binomial name
- Cheirogaleus minusculus Groves, 2000
- Lesser iron-gray dwarf lemur range

Species of lemur

The lesser iron-gray dwarf lemur (Cheirogaleus minusculus), or large iron-gray dwarf lemur, is a small nocturnal lemur endemic to Madagascar. It is nocturnal and an arboreal quadruped, and is not very agile. It produces three types of vocalisation: a squeak, which is high in pitch and is produced with the mouth closed, and is used between infants and their mothers; a whistle, which is higher in pitch than the squeak, so it is hard to hear with human ears, and is used as a communicative and possibly territorial call; and a grunt, which is usually given in series and is very powerful, used when an individual is being attacked in its nest.

This species is only known to exist from one museum specimen from Ambositra, north of Fianarantsoa in east-central Madagascar. As of 2010, no studies in the wild have been conducted of the lesser iron-gray dwarf lemur, and it is unknown whether it still survives in this region. There are no reports of it being kept in captivity.
