= Yves Rumpler =

Yves Rumpler (born 1938), is a French researcher and primatologist. He was a professor of embryology and primatology at the Louis Pasteur University of Strasbourg until he retired in 2007.

== Career ==
In 1959 Yves Rumpler was appointed assistant chief in the Institute of Embryology at the University of Strasbourg and until 1966 his research focused on traditional subjects studied at Strasbourg e.g. thyroid hormones, teratology. From 1966 to 1976, Yves Rumpler was an associate lecturer in histology and embryology at the National School of Medicine, Tananarive, Madagascar (now part of the University of Antananarivo). He undertook studies on the systematic and chromosomal evolution of the lemurs in Madagascar and is consequently recognized for his work in primatology. He then served as department head of the Laboratory of Reproductive Biology and Cytogenetics Laboratory, studying quantitative cytology and histology at the teaching hospital of Strasbourg. From 1980 to 2007 Yves Rumpler taught at the Institute of Embryology in the University of Strasbourg.

He has received an honorary doctorate from the Ruhr University of Bochum, Germany.

== Discoveries ==
Yves Rumpler took part in the description of new species of primates:

- Hapalemur aureus Meier, Albignac, Peyrieras, Wright and Rumpler, described in 1987
- Tarsius dentatus Niemitz, Nietsch, Warter and Rumpler, described into 1991 in Sulawesi (Indonesia)
- Tarsius dianae Niemitz, Nietsch, Warter and Rumpler, described in 1991
- Lepilemur aeeclis Andriaholinirina, Fausser, Roos, Zinner, Thalmann, Rabarivola, Ravoarimanana, Ganzhom, Meier, Hilgartner, Walter, Zaromody, Langer, Hahn, Zimmermann, Radespiel, Craul, Tomiuk, Tattersall and Rumpler, Lepilemuridae lemur discovered in Madagascar and described in 2006
- Lepilemur randrianasoli Andriaholinirina, Fausser, Roos, Zinner, Thalmann, Rabarivola, Ravoarimanana, Ganzhom, Meier, Hilgartner, Walter, Zaromody, Langer, Hahn, Zimmermann, Radespiel, Craul, Tomiuk, Tattersall and Rumpler, Lepilemuridae lemur discovered in Madagascar and described in 2006
- Lepilemur sahamalaza Andriaholinirina, Fausser, Roos, Zinner, Thalmann, Rabarivola, Ravoarimanana, Ganzhom, Meier, Hilgartner, Walter, Zaromody, Langer, Hahn, Zimmermann, Radespiel, Craul, Tomiuk, Tattersall and Rumpler, Lepilemuridae lemur discovered in Madagascar and described in 2006

With Elwyn L. Simons, he also created the genus name for the true lemurs: Eulemur (Simons & Rumpler 1988). This new genus joined together the species Eulemur fulvus, E. mongoz, E. macaco, E. rubriventer and E. coronatus which were previously in the genus Lemur.

== Bibliography ==
Selected work from scientific magazines and the field of the primatology:

- Mammifères lémuriens (Primates, Prosimiens), Faunes de Madagascar, fasc. 44, CNRS-ORSTOM, Paris, 1977, (by Jean-Jacques Petter, Roland Albignac and Yves Rumpler).
- Atlas d'embryologie clinique. Anatomie sectionnelle et imagerie de l'embryon et du fœtus, De Boeck University, 1997, ISBN 2-8041-2382-0, (in collaboration with Yves Rumpler).
