= Sibree's dwarf lemur =

Conservation status
- Critically Endangered (IUCN 3.1)
- CITES Appendix I

Scientific classification
- Kingdom: Animalia
- Phylum: Chordata
- Class: Mammalia
- Infraclass: Placentalia
- Order: Primates
- Suborder: Strepsirrhini
- Family: Cheirogaleidae
- Genus: Cheirogaleus
- Species: C. sibreei

Binomial name
- Cheirogaleus sibreei (Forsyth Major, 1896)
- Sibree's dwarf lemur range

Synonyms
- Chirogale sibreei protonym

Species of lemur

Sibree's dwarf lemur (Cheirogaleus sibreei) is a small nocturnal lemur endemic to Madagascar.

The name of this dwarf lemur commemorates the English missionary and naturalist James Sibree (1836–1929).

In 2010, a research team confirmed that they had found the only known living population of Sibree's dwarf lemurs several years before. The species was long believed extinct, following the destruction of its first recorded forest habitat. This was also the first confirmation of Sibree's dwarf lemur as a unique species.

Sibree's dwarf lemur spends the winter by hibernating 10 to 40 cm (3.9 to 15.7 in) underground in small burrows. This keeps body temperature steady at around 15 °C (59 °F) and possibly provides protection from predators.
