= Ankarana dwarf lemur =

Conservation status
- Endangered (IUCN 3.1)
- CITES Appendix I

Scientific classification
- Kingdom: Animalia
- Phylum: Chordata
- Class: Mammalia
- Infraclass: Placentalia
- Order: Primates
- Suborder: Strepsirrhini
- Family: Cheirogaleidae
- Genus: Cheirogaleus
- Species: C. shethi

Binomial name
- Cheirogaleus shethi Frasier et al., 2016

Species of lemur

The Ankarana dwarf lemur or Sheth's dwarf lemur (Cheirogaleus shethi) is a species of dwarf lemur, part of the C. medius group, known only from northern Madagascar. It has been found in two reserves (Ankarana Special Reserve and Analamerana Special Reserve) as well as two protected areas (Andrafiamena-Andavakoera and Loky-Manambato). It was identified in 2014, but not formally described until 2016. Its conservation status has not been determined, but it is at risk from habitat destruction due to daily resource extraction by local human populations.
