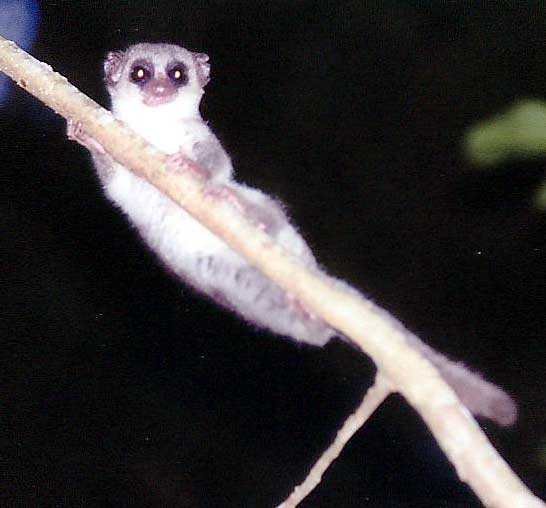

Conservation status
- Vulnerable (IUCN 3.1)
- CITES Appendix I

Scientific classification
- Kingdom: Animalia
- Phylum: Chordata
- Class: Mammalia
- Infraclass: Placentalia
- Order: Primates
- Suborder: Strepsirrhini
- Family: Cheirogaleidae
- Genus: Cheirogaleus
- Species: C. medius

Binomial name
- Cheirogaleus medius É. Geoffroy, 1812
- Fat-tailed dwarf lemur range

Synonyms
- minor É. Geoffroy, 1812; samati Grandidier, 1867

= Fat-tailed dwarf lemur =

Fat-Tailed Dwarf Lemur

Species of lemur

The fat-tailed dwarf lemur (Cheirogaleus medius), also known as the lesser dwarf lemur, western fat-tailed dwarf lemur, or spiny forest dwarf lemur, is endemic to Madagascar.

The fat-tailed dwarf lemur is 8–9 in (200–230 mm) long from its head to the end of its torso, with an 8–11 in (200–280 mm) tail extending beyond that. It weighs 4–10 oz (110–280 g). It has a lifespan of 4-11 years in the wild and 29 years in captivity. It uses its tail to store fat reserves for torpor.

== Hibernation ==
Recent research has shown that C. medius hibernates (or aestivates), even though in the tropical winter of Madagascar, temperatures remain high. It is the first tropical mammal and only primate in which hibernation has been demonstrated. However, the Malagasy winter is dry, and it appears that the lemur is avoiding the drought. It can hibernate for seven months. Unlike animals that hibernate in temperate regions, the lemur does not control its body temperature while hibernating, and if the tree hole in which it is sleeping is not well insulated, its body temperature fluctuates in accordance with the outside temperature. During torpor, this lemur has been found to periodically enter REM sleep; non-REM sleep has not been observed, a pattern opposite that found in hibernating ground squirrels. The REM sleep episodes occurred during periods of higher ambient temperature (averaging 27 C, versus an average of 20 C during nonsleeping intervals while in torpor).

C. medius has a significantly longer lifespan than other strepsirrhinine or nonstrepsirrhinine primates of similar size, and this longevity is thought to be related to its status as part of the only primate genus that is an obligatory hibernator. Its maximum lifespan in captivity is nearly 30 years.

Like other fat-tailed lemurs, C. medius is able to store fat in its tail, and this provides a source of energy during its period of dormancy.

== Reproduction ==
Although most C. medius live in areas where the environment is dry, there are those who live in tropical rain forest. Through research, it is understood that these animals hibernation period is linked to their reproduction strategies. In the rainforest these lemurs are in more of an active state than they would be in a dry forest. This level of high activity from the lemurs is linked to higher reproduction rates according to Dr. Lahann.

== Taxonomy ==
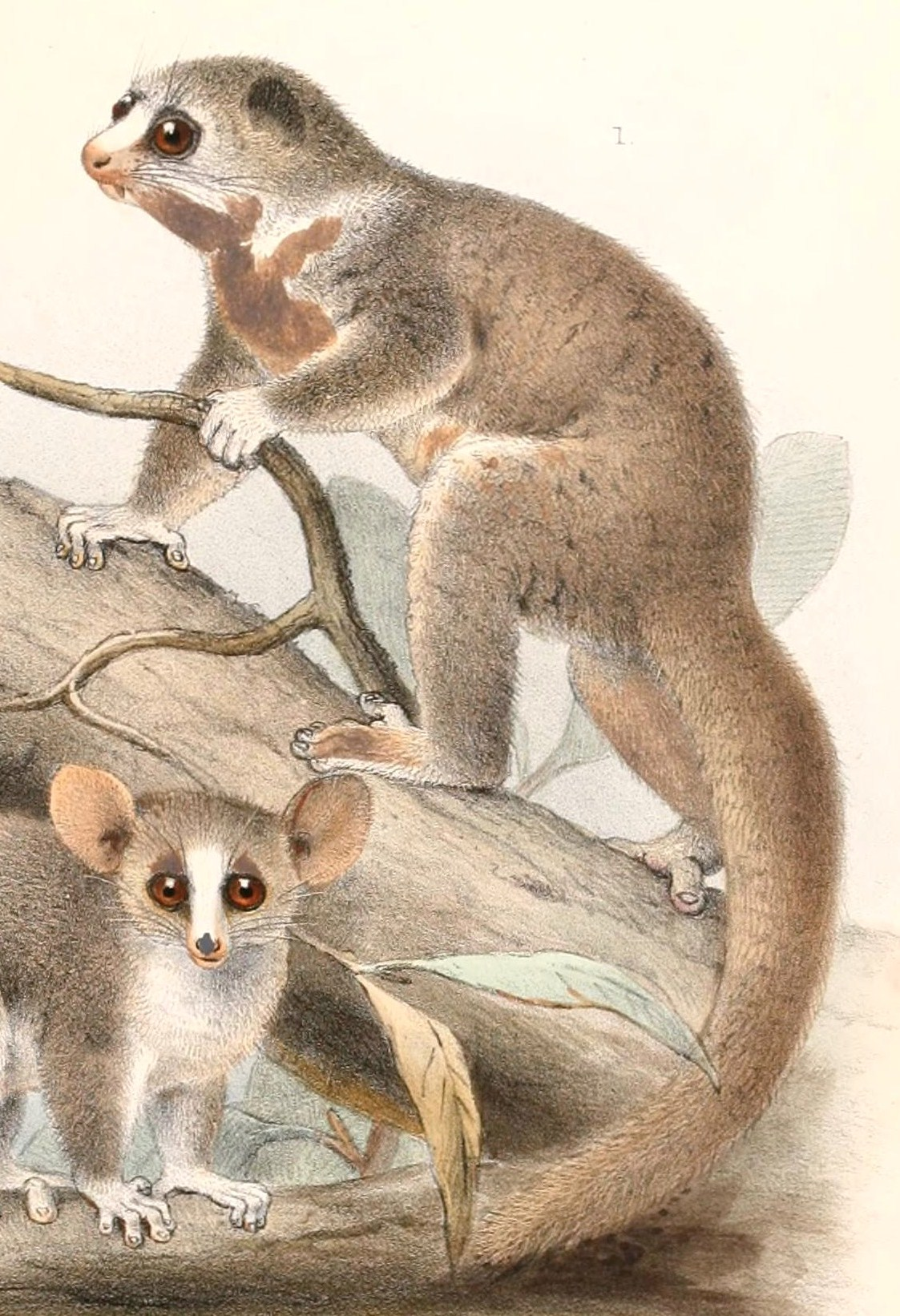
Cheirogaleus adipicaudatus

Between 2000 and 2009, a population of dwarf lemur was known as a separate species, the southern fat-tailed dwarf lemur (Cheirogaleus adipicaudatus). It was described by taxonomist Colin Groves as having a pelage coloration that is dark dorsally and gray ventrally, with a vaguely expressed dorsal stripe running down the back, a relatively short white median facial stripe, and black eye-rings. However, in 2009, Groeneveld et al. demonstrated genetically that Cheirogaleus adipicaudatus was a synonym of Cheirogaleus medius, so the southern fat-tailed dwarf lemur is no longer recognized as a species.

== Behaviour ==
This species is nocturnal, with a diet of insects, other small animals, fruits and flowers.

The fat-tailed lemur is the only known primate to hibernate for extended periods of time, up to seven months. It performs this torpor during the dry season to minimise the impacts of droughts. During the wet season, it gorges on food, accumulating a fat reserve in its tail. By the beginning of torpor, the tail accounts for up to 40% of its body weight.
