= Simmons' mouse lemur =

Conservation status
- Endangered (IUCN 3.1)
- CITES Appendix I

Scientific classification
- Kingdom: Animalia
- Phylum: Chordata
- Class: Mammalia
- Order: Primates
- Suborder: Strepsirrhini
- Family: Cheirogaleidae
- Genus: Microcebus
- Species: M. simmonsi

Binomial name
- Microcebus simmonsi Louis et al., 2006
- Distribution of M. simmonsi

Species of lemur

Simmons' mouse lemur (Microcebus simmonsi) is a species of mouse lemur known only from Betampona Special Reserve, Analalava Special Community Reserve near Foulpointe, and Zahamena National Park in Madagascar.

The species is named in honor of Dr. Lee Simmons, former director of the Omaha Henry Doorly Zoo in Nebraska.

Simmons' mouse lemur is the largest of the east coast mouse lemurs. The body is dark reddish to orange brown with black-tipped hairs on the crown and sometimes a stripe down middle of the back. There is a distinctive white patch on the snout and the belly is grayish white to white.

The discovery of this species was announced June 21, 2006 at the Conservation International Global Symposium in Antananarivo, Madagascar, along with the discovery of Mittermeier's mouse lemur Microcebus mittermeieri and Jolly's mouse lemur Microcebus jollyae as separate species. These new species were also officially announced in a paper in the International Journal of Primatology.
