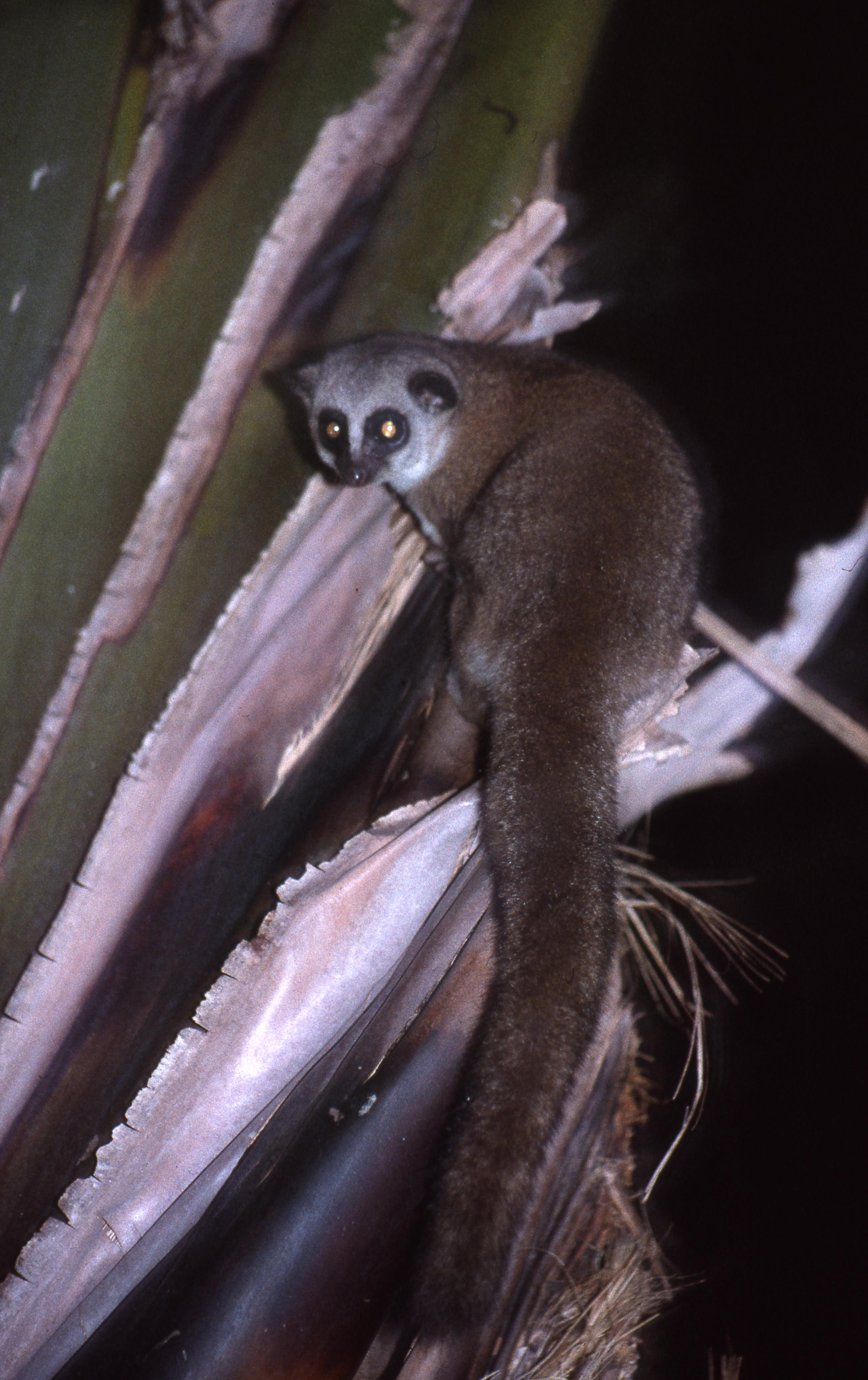

Conservation status
- Vulnerable (IUCN 3.1)
- CITES Appendix I

Scientific classification
- Kingdom: Animalia
- Phylum: Chordata
- Class: Mammalia
- Order: Primates
- Suborder: Strepsirrhini
- Family: Cheirogaleidae
- Genus: Cheirogaleus
- Species: C. major

Binomial name
- Cheirogaleus major É. Geoffroy, 1812
- Greater dwarf lemur range

Synonyms
- commersonii Wolf, 1822; griseus Lesson, 1840; milii É. Geoffroy, 1828; typicus A. Smith, 1833; typus F. Cuvier, 1842

= Greater dwarf lemur =

Species of lemur

The greater dwarf lemur (Cheirogaleus major), or the Geoffroy's dwarf lemur, is a lemur that is widely distributed over the primary and secondary forests near the eastern coast of Madagascar. They are also found in northern parts of Madagascar. Greater dwarf lemurs live in forests and dry scrub areas. The head and body of the greater dwarf lemur can range from 167 to 264 millimeters in length, and 164 to 600 grams. Their tails can range from 195 to 310 millimeters in length.

Greater dwarf lemurs are nocturnal. During the day, they sleep in nests of twigs, leaves, and grass, or hollowed sections of trees padded with dry leaves.

Their diet consists mostly of fruits, flowers, and nectar. Flower nectar is an important part of the diet from November to December. Sometimes they will also eat insects and small vertebrates. During the dry seasons they will store fat in their tail and become dormant.

Its fur is short, dense, grey or reddish brown, and there are dark circles of fur around the eyes. At the end of the wet season the tail will become somewhat swollen with fat.

The greater dwarf lemur is preyed upon by the ring-tailed mongoose (Galidia elegans) during the dormant season. Other predators the Malagasy tree boa (Boa manditra), the Madagascar buzzard (Buteo brachypterus), and it is thought probably by the fossa (Cryptoprocta ferox) as well, since the latter preys on other lemurs.

== Locomotion ==
The greater dwarf lemur is an arboreal quadruped, it moves along the horizontal branches with a regular gait pattern involving all four limbs. They are not agile leapers.

== Mating ==
Mating occurs in October with births from November to February. Mothers build nests to give birth to their offspring that average in height from six to twelve meters. They generally give birth to twins. Mothers carry infants in their mouths.

== Vocalization ==
Greater dwarf lemurs are not very vocal. They make soft calls to locate others.

== Taxonomy ==
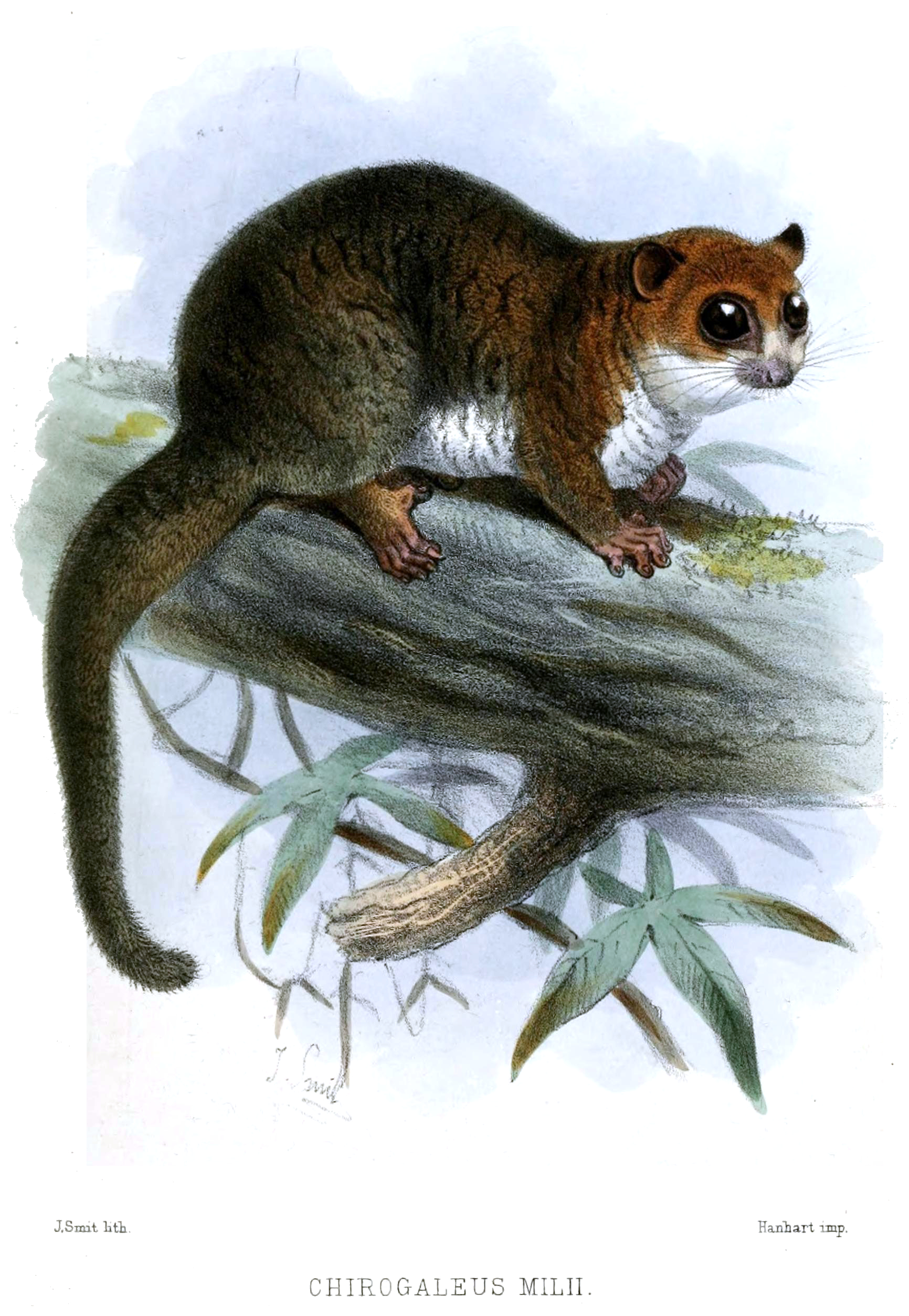

Between 2000 and 2009, populations of dwarf lemur around Tamatave, Tampira, Mahambo, Ancaya, Ambodivoangy, and Fesi Malendo were known as a separate species, the greater iron-gray dwarf lemur (Cheirogaleus ravus). It was described as having a pelage coloration that is iron-gray with brownish tones, a vague dorsal stripe, white feet, a tail with a white tip, and dark ears that are either naked or sparsely covered with hair. However, in 2009, Groeneveld et al. demonstrated genetically that Cheirogaleus ravus was a synonym of Cheirogaleus major, so the greater iron-gray dwarf lemur is no longer recognized as a species.
