= Anne D. Yoder =

American biologist, researcher, and professor

- Citizenship: American
- Occupations: Biologist, Professor, Researcher
- Known for: Biology, Zoology, Environmentalism
- Spouse: David Michael Hart
- Parent(s): Edwin Yoder, Mary Jane Yoder
- Website: yoderlab.org

Anne Daphne Yoder is an American biologist, researcher, and professor in the Department of Biology at Duke University in Durham, North Carolina, United States. Yoder's work includes the study, preservation, and conservation of the multifarious biodiversity found in Madagascar. One of her main research topics focuses on the diverse lemur population found on the island. Specifically, Yoder's research concentrates on assorted geographic factors that lead to varying levels of biological differences in the speciation process. Her investigations utilize genome research to further understand the complex and unique degree of speciation that occurs in lemur populations. In 2023, she was elected to the National Academy of Sciences.

== Biography ==
Anne Yoder was born in Charlotte, North Carolina. Anne is the daughter of Pulitzer Prize winning American journalist Edwin Yoder and Mary Jane Yoder. She is married to writer and artist, David Micheal Hart.

== Education and career ==
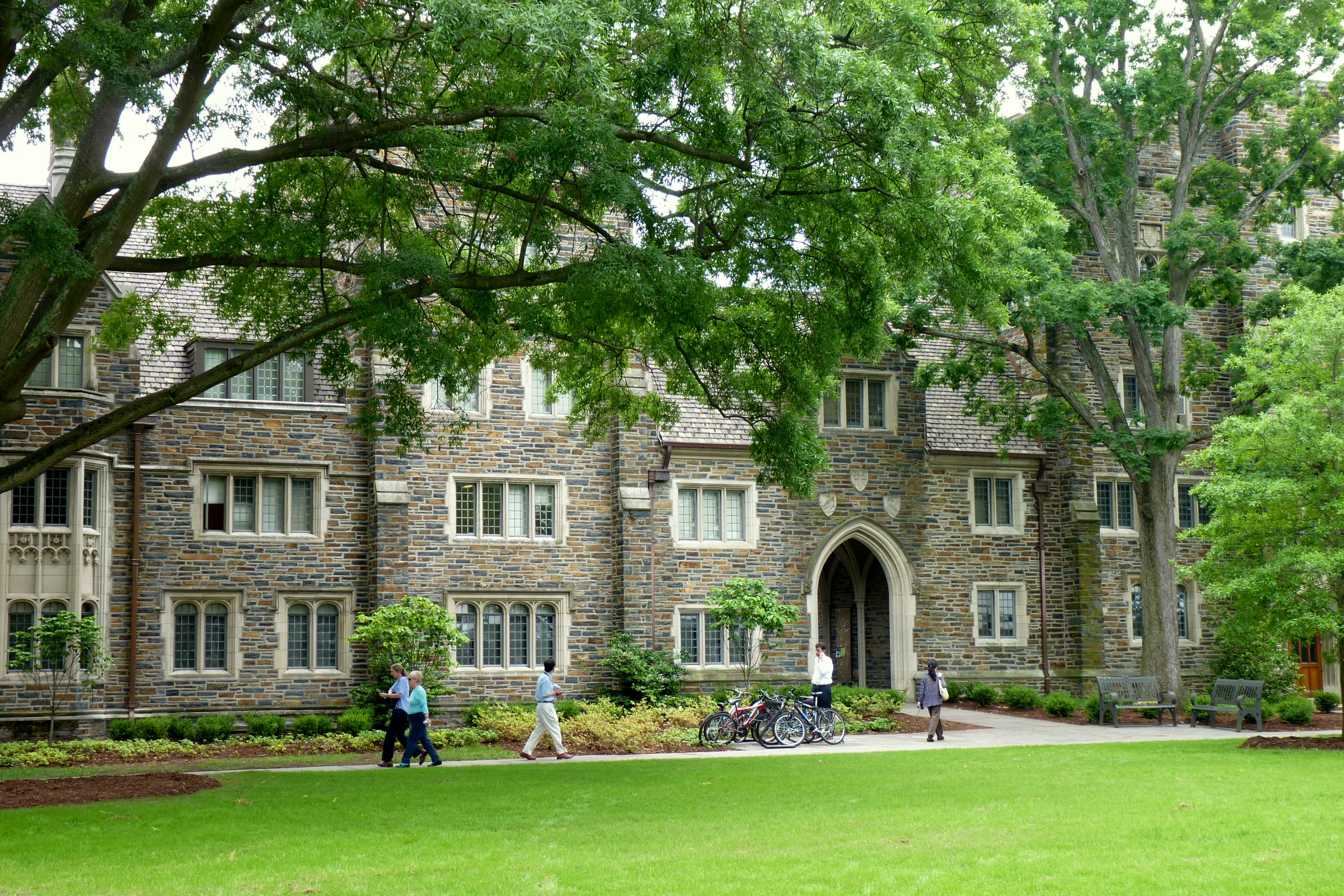
Duke University

Yoder received her B.A. in zoology from the University of North Carolina at Chapel Hill, in 1981. Before receiving her doctorate, Anne worked at both the Smithsonian Museum of Natural History and the American Museum of Natural History, in the department of vertebrate zoology and department of mammalogy, respectively. She went on to receive her Ph.D. in biology from Duke University in 1992. For the next three years, Anne was a Postdoctoral Fellow in the environmental biology program at Harvard University. From 1996–2001, Yoder was an associate professor at Northwestern University. She went on to be an associate professor at Yale University from 2001–2005. During her time at Yale, Yoder also became the associate curator of mammals at the Peabody Museum of Natural History. In 2005, Yoder became a professor of biology in the Trinity College of Arts and Science at Duke University. In 2006, she went on to become the director of the Duke Lemur Center, whose facility houses 18 different species of lemurs and over 250 specimens. Yoder often cites the Lemur Center as the inspiration and advent of her career in the zoological and ecological sciences. As the Center's director, Yoder seeks to strengthen already close ties with Duke's Department of Biological Anthropology and Anatomy. She also wants to increase research and educational connections with the Nicholas School of the Environment and Earth Sciences, the Institute for Genome Sciences and Policy (IGSP) and other Duke organizations. Later, in 2011, she joined DuPRI's Center for Population Health & Aging as a faculty research scholar. That same year, she also became a faculty network member of the Duke Institute for Brain Sciences. In 2014, Yoder became an affiliate of the Duke Initiative for Science & Society. Anne is the executive committee president of the Society for Systematic Biologists, who publish the academic journal, Systematic Biologists. Yoder joined Duke's faculty in August 2017.

== Research ==
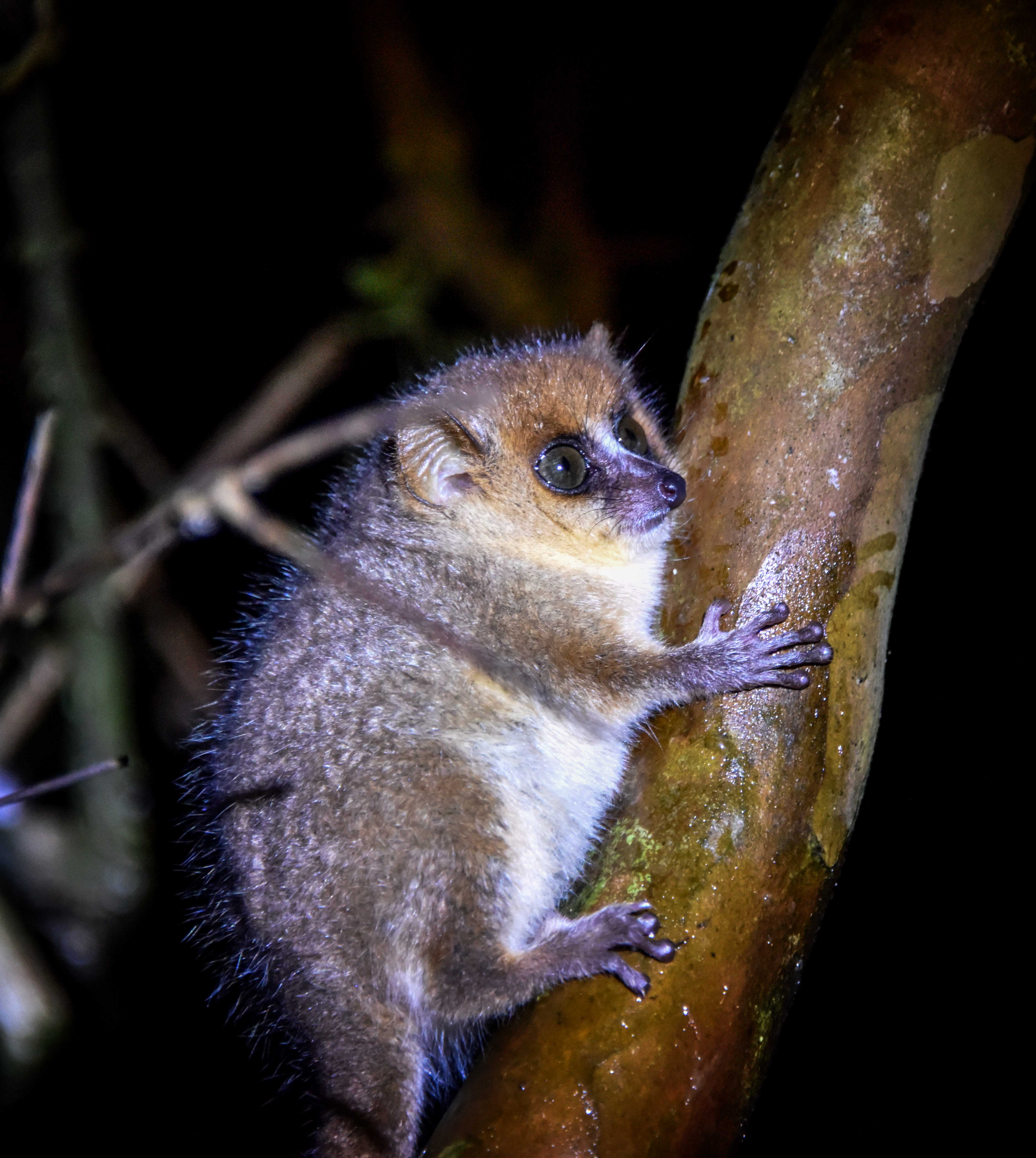
Mouse Lemur

Yoder's works revolves around a diverse selection of research topics including environmental studies, speciation, biological evolution, phylogenetics, and phylogeography. Yoder has also been involved with research that seeks to understand the effects of climate change on Madagascar's environment, the indigenous lemur populations, and possible migration patterns that lemurs may implement due to the continuing increase in temperatures. Recently, Yoder and her team conducted research on a species of mouse lemurs. Through their research they were able to articulate changes in Madagascar's environment, primarily habitat fragmentation, via phylogeographic analysis of the mouse lemurs highly evolving DNA. Yoder and her team were able to assess this data due to the mouse lemur's frequent and high reproduction rates, allowing changes in DNA to be examined more easily. She has published and co-published over one hundred research papers since 1992 in various scientific and academic journals including, Science, Nature, Molecular Ecology, Journal of Evolutionary Biology, Proceedings of the National Academy of Sciences, American Journal of Primatology, and American Journal of Physical Anthropology. In addition to her published papers, Yoder maintains her own website, The Yoder Lab, that includes updates concerning her continued research. From her website, Yoder has written that her research statement consists of "Integrative Evolutionary Genetics in the Service of Conserving Biodiversity."

== Outreach and scholarship ==
Yoder has been involved with the non-profit organization, Women in Science Tomorrow, and went on to join the Board of Directors. The organization's primary goal is the further increase of overall interest in the sciences for young girls. Yoder has also been involved with FEMMES, or Females Excelling More in Math, Engineering, and Science, as a thesis advisor.

== Awards and honors ==
- American Academy of Arts and Sciences, Member (2021)
- John Simon Guggenheim Memorial Foundation Fellowship (2018)
- Alexander von Humboldt Foundation Fellowship (2018)
- Duke Graduate School Few-Glasson Alumni Society Inductee (2018)
- Braxton Craven Distinguished Professor of Evolutionary Biology (2017)
- Society for Systematic Biology, President Elect (2015)
- National Science Foundation Career Development Award (2000)
- Josephine Bay Paul and C. Michael Paul Foundation Biodiversity Leadership Award (2002)
- Katherine Stern Dissertation Fellowship (1991)
- Best Student Paper in Systematic Zoology, American Society of Zoologists (1991)
- The Sherwood Washburn Student Paper Prize, American Association of Physical Anthropologists (1991)
