= James Sibree =

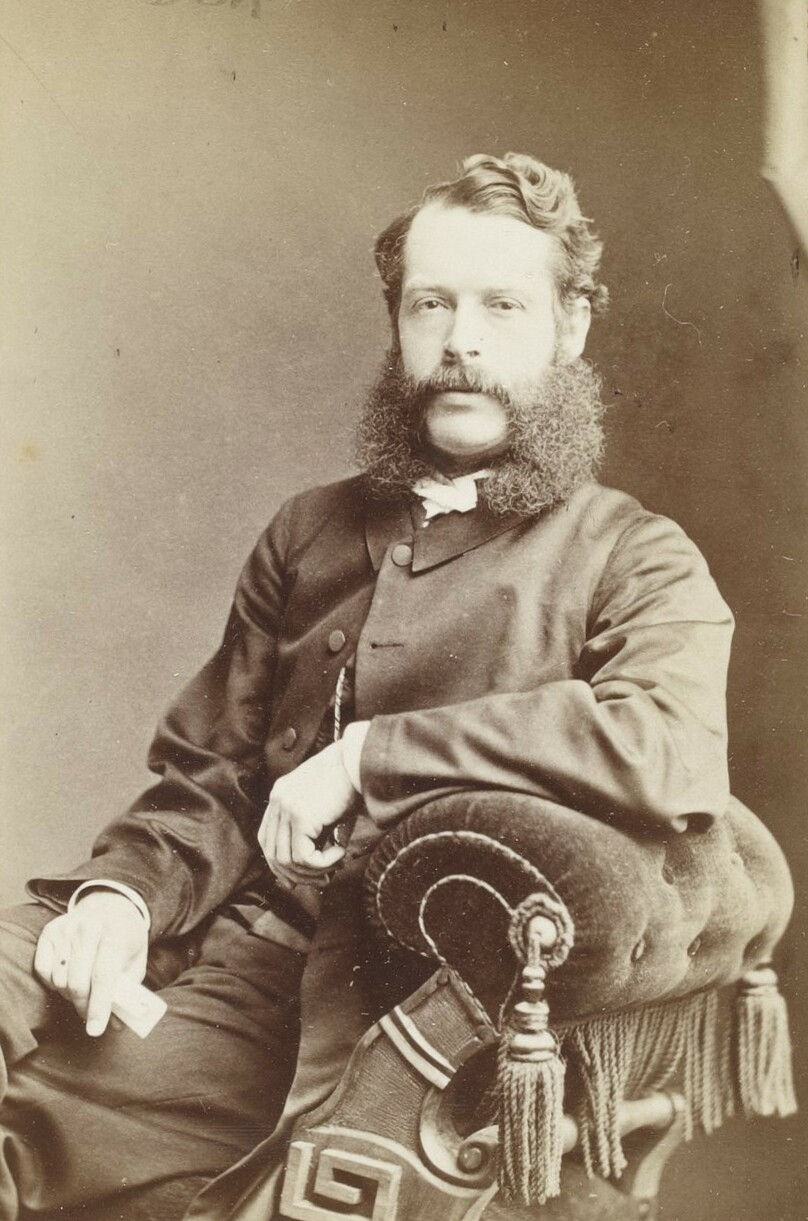
- Born: 14 April 1836; Hull, England
- Died: 6 September 1929 (aged 93); London
- Education: Hull Grammar School; Spring Hill College
- Occupations: missionary, civil engineer, and author
- Employer: London Missionary Society
- Known for: work in Madagascar
- Title: Reverend, Doctor

James Sibree (1836–1929) was an English missionary in Madagascar with an interest in the natural history and cultural history of the island. He was a contemporary of the French naturalist Alfred Grandidier and wrote detailed books about the flora and fauna of Madagascar, the country's general history, and the mission history on the island. He also helped revise the Malagasy Bible and wrote several works in the Malagasy language. He was a vocal advocate of Malagasy independence prior to the French invasion of Madagascar in 1895. Sibree also designed and helped build almost 100 new mission buildings and 50 churches in Madagascar. He was a fellow of the Royal Geographical Society and earned an honorary degree from the University of St Andrews. Swiss zoologist Charles Immanuel Forsyth Major named Sibree's dwarf lemur after him in 1896.

Son of a Congregational minister, he apprenticed as a civil engineer before travelling to Antananarivo, Madagascar in 1863 on assignment from the London Missionary Society (LMS) to oversee the construction of four churches. After returning to England in 1867, he was ordained in 1870. He returned to Madagascar from 1870 to 1877, leaving again following difficulties with the Malagasy government. After spending a few years in England and South India, he returned to Madagascar again in 1883 and stayed until 1915. He died in 1929 due to a car accident. He and his wife had five children, four of which also become missionaries.

== Early life and career ==
Born on 14 April 1836 in Hull, England, to a Congregational minister, Rev. James Sibree, and Martha Goode Aston, he attended Hull Collegiate School and apprenticed as a civil engineer at the Local Board of Health in Hull from 1859 to 1863. In 1863, he travelled to Antananarivo, Madagascar after being assigned by the London Missionary Society (LMS) to oversee the architecture of four large stone churches, each of which was dedicated as a memorial to a recent martyr. The churches were located at Ambatonakanga, Ambohipotsy, Andohalo, and Manjakaray. Along with the churches, he was also involved with the construction of other mission buildings before returning to England in 1867. Upon his return, he studied for the Congregational ministry at Spring Hill College in the Moseley area of Birmingham, England from 1868 until 1870. During that time, he acted as a deputator for the LMS. In 1870, he was ordained in Hull and got married.

He returned as a LMS missionary to Madagascar in 1870, taking up residence in Ambohimanga and establishing the first country station there. From that station, he managed the mission work operating outside the capital. He was selected as an LMS delegate to help revise the Malagasy Bible in 1873. In 1874, he joined the LMS delegation on a trip to Antsihanaka province, and embarked on another mission-related journey to south-eastern Madagascar in 1876. Later that year he moved to Antananarivo to teach at theological college.

In 1877, he left Madagascar due to "difficulties with the government." For the next two years, he did deputation work for the LMS in England. In 1879, he was appointed to South India to superintend the high school run by LMS at Vizagapatam. While there, his wife's health deteriorated, forcing them to return in 1880 to England, in which he continued deputation work until 1883. Returning to Madagascar, he continued missionary work along with his wife and became the principal at the theological college. Preceding the French invasion of Madagascar in 1895, he was a vocal advocate of Malagasy independence, insisting the LMS in England adopt the same stance. When his wife's health once again deteriorated in 1915, he retired from his position at the theological college and returned to England. The following year he resigned from mission work, though he continued deputation work for both the LMS and Bible Society throughout the 1920s. During his career, he was a contemporary of the French naturalist Alfred Grandidier.

== Publications ==
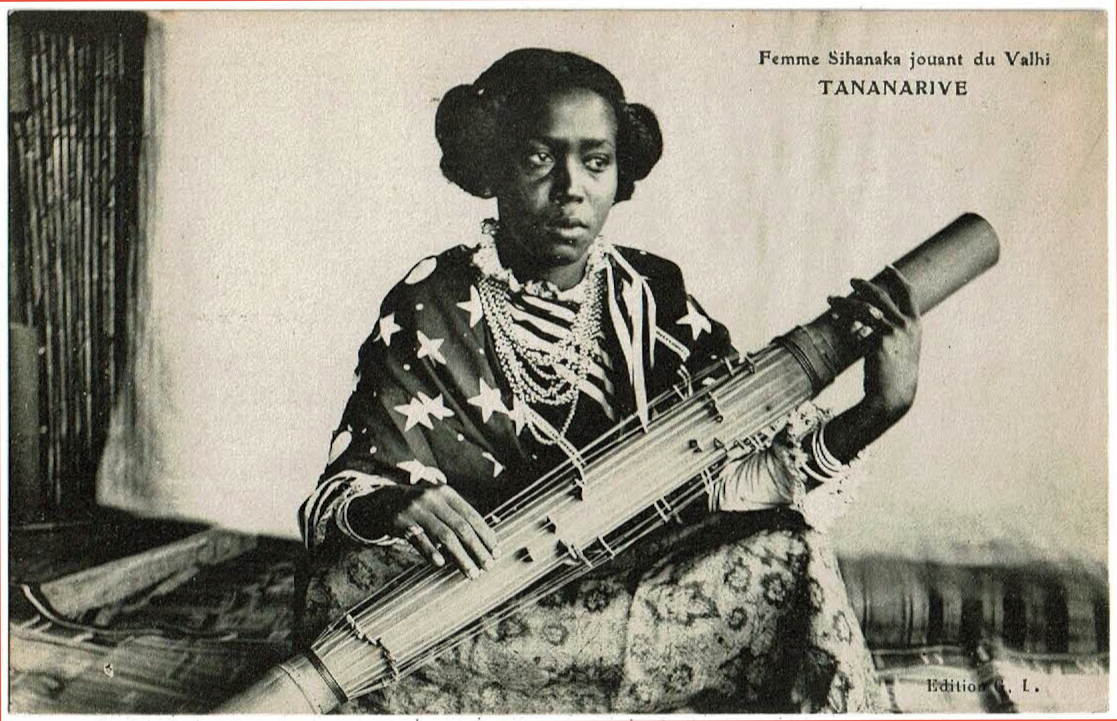
Photo Sibree took that sold as a postcard: Sihanaka woman in Antananariv, Madagascar playing a valiha tube zither, pre 1912 A.D.

In addition to publishing many popular, detailed books about the flora and fauna of Madagascar, the country's general history, and the mission history on the island, he also edited Register of Missionaries and Deputations of the LMS (1923) and wrote several works in the Malagasy language, as well as articles about Madagascar which were published in several editions of Encyclopædia Britannica and Chambers's Encyclopaedia. In all, he published sixteen books in English, including his autobiography, Fifty Years in Madagascar (1923) and the following works:

- Madagascar and its People (1870)
- South-east Madagascar (1876)
- The Great African Island: Chapters on Madagascar (1880)
- A Madagascar Bibliography (1885)
- Madagascar before the Conquest (1896)
- The Madagascar Mission (1907)
- Our English Cathedrals (2 volumes, 1911)
- A Naturalist in Madagascar (1915)
- Things Seen in Madagascar (1921)

== Achievements and recognition ==
James Sibree and his family, c. 1901

In addition to his writing, Sibree regularly designed and built new mission buildings, almost 100 in all, in addition to 50 churches. He was the chief English authority on Madagascar, and was elected as a fellow of the Royal Geographical Society, as well as the International Society of Philology. His work on the geography and bibliography of the island earned him Sir George Back's Grant in 1892. In 1902, he became a member of the Malagasy Academy (l'Académie Malgache), and he was awarded an honorary degree of Doctor of Divinity from the University of St Andrews in 1913. Sibree's dwarf lemur (Cheirogaleus sibreei) was named after him in 1896 by the Swiss zoologist Charles Immanuel Forsyth Major.

== Personal life ==
In 1870, he married Deborah Hannah, the daughter of the Congregational minister in London, Rev. J. Wilberforce Richardson. Together they had two sons and three daughters. Four of his children, also became missionaries: James Wilberforce Sibree (1871–1927), Marie-Amélie Sibree (1874–1926), Deborah Marie Sibree (1876–1928), and Elsie Sibree Isabel (1881–1954). His wife died in 1920, and he died in London on 6 September 1929 at age 93 as a result of a car accident.

== Archives ==
The papers of James Sibree are held by SOAS Archives
