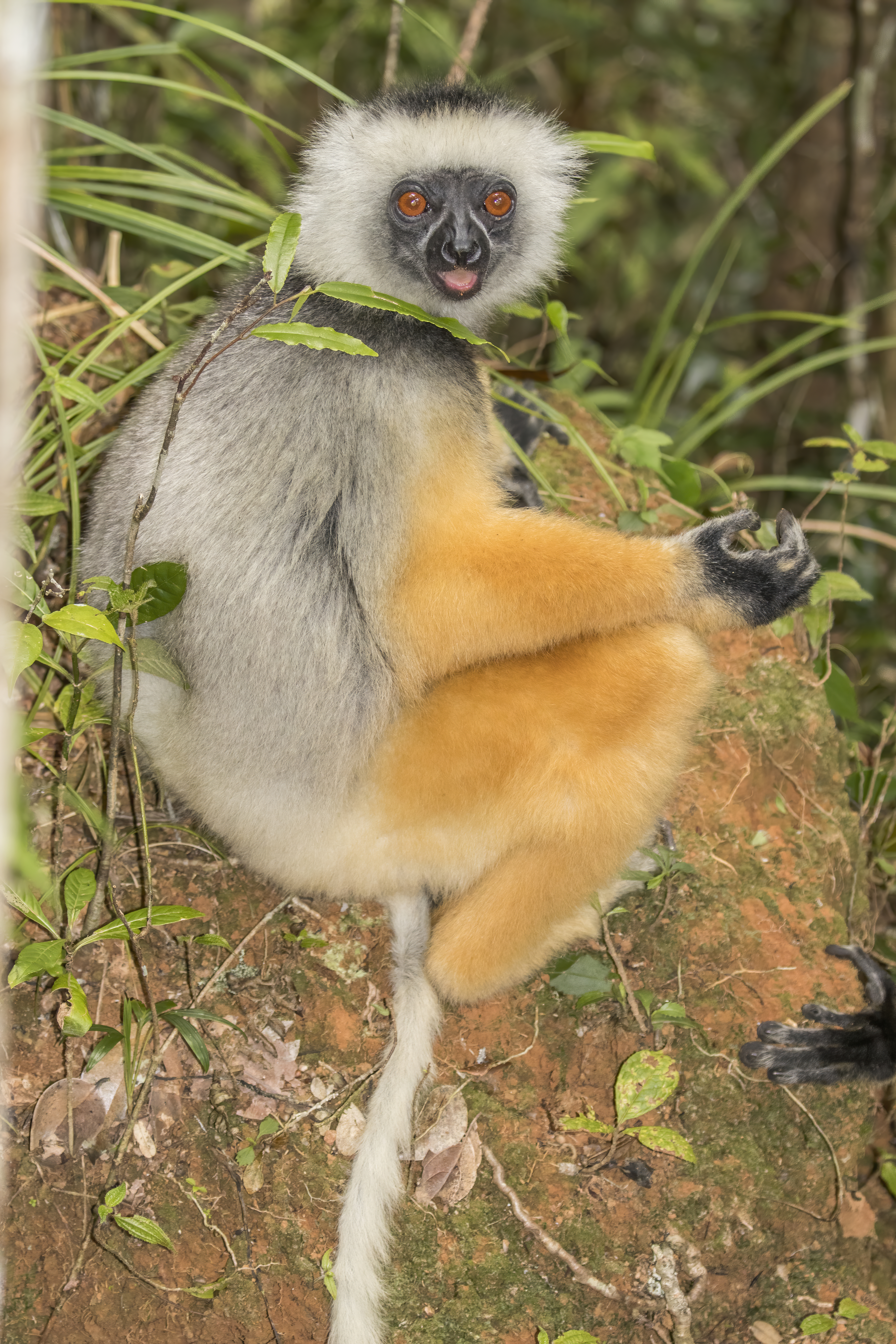
- Diademed sifaka at Analamazaotra Special Reserve

Conservation status
- Critically Endangered (IUCN 3.1)
- CITES Appendix I

Scientific classification
- Kingdom: Animalia
- Phylum: Chordata
- Class: Mammalia
- Order: Primates
- Suborder: Strepsirrhini
- Family: Indriidae
- Genus: Propithecus
- Species: P. diadema

Binomial name
- Propithecus diadema Bennett, 1832
- Distribution of P. diadema

Synonyms
- albus Vinson, 1862; typicus A. Smith, 1833

= Diademed sifaka =

Species of lemur

The diademed sifaka (Propithecus diadema), or diademed simpona, is a critically endangered sifaka endemic to rainforests in eastern Madagascar. Along with the indri, it is one of the two largest living lemurs, with an average weight of 6.5 kg (14 lb) and an average length of 105 cm (41 in), half of which is its tail. It has a striking appearance that features a silky coat of brightly colored limbs that contrast with black, white, and gray shades on its torso, head, and tail. Russell Mittermeier, one of the contemporary authorities on lemurs, describes the diademed sifaka as "one of the most colorful and attractive of all the lemurs."

The diademed sifaka is a diurnal, arboreal folivore that seasonally augments its diet with a variety of foods, including seeds, fruit, and flowers. It lives in small, territorial, female-dominated troops of two to nine individuals, which consist of infants, juveniles, and adults of both sexes. Every day, a diademed sifaka patrols the boundaries of its home range with its fellows, depositing scent markings at contested trees along the way. Group confrontations are rare due to its low population density and well-defined territories. Females are seasonal breeders, being receptive to mating for only a few days a year. The diademed sifaka has an abnormally slow life history for a folivorous primate of its size, as adults can live for up to 25 years in the wild, with sexual maturity typically occurring at five years of age. It was previously considered to be the titular subspecies of a broader species that included the other eastern sifakas of the Propithecus genus. As such, "Propithecus diadema" can also refer to a taxonomic group consisting of the diademed sifaka and three other species.

The diademed sifaka is classified as a critically endangered species by the IUCN Red list and faces existential threats from habitat loss due to illegal logging and slash and burn agriculture. Poaching is another threat to the survival of the species, as many of the taboos that prohibit killing or eating other sifaka species in Malagasy culture do not apply to the diademed sifaka. It is threatened by these issues both within and outside of protected areas. Population recovery is made difficult by its slow reproductive rate, high rate of infant mortality, and low population density, which increase its susceptibility to inbreeding depression.

== Etymology ==
The name "sifaka" is derived from the terrestrial alarm vocalization produced by some species of western sifaka. Eastern sifakas such as the diademed sifaka instead produce a sneeze-like "vouiff" vocalization in the same context. As such, some scientists instead refer to the species as the diademed simpona, which is adapted from local Malagasy names derived from the sneeze vocalization, including simpona, simpoon, and simpony. Early spellings from French sources include simpoune and simèpoune. An alternative etymology relates simpona to sampong, which is the Kadazan name for Hose's langur (Presbytis hosei). The diademed sifaka is known as the sadabe in the Tsinjoarivo Classified Forest, which means "multicolored" and "big" in Malagasy. Its binomial name, Propithecus diadema, was coined by Edward Turner Bennett in 1832 in reference to the white frontal band that encircles its face, which resembles a diadem. Synonyms that have been applied to the species include Macromerus typicus Smith, 1833 and Indris albus Vinson, 1862.

== Taxonomic classification ==
The diademed sifaka is a member of the genus Propithecus. It is the titular member of the P. diadema group, which includes the three species of eastern rainforest sifakas and the eastern dry forest Perrier's sifaka (P. perrieri) to the exclusion of the five members of the P. verreauxi group of western sifakas. The diademed sifaka's somatic number is 2n = 42. The X chromosome and 18 of its autosomal chromosomes are metacentric, 14 are submetacentric, and eight chromosomes and the Y chromosome are acrocentric. One of its metacentric chromosomes could have formed from a Robertsonian translocation between two acrocentric chromosomes, resulting in a reduced somatic number compared to the 2n = 44 seen in Milne-Edwards's sifaka (P. edwardsi). Like other lemurs, the diademed sifaka evolved on Madagascar.

=== Changes in taxonomy ===
The diademed sifaka was first described by Edward Turner Bennett in 1832 based on a skin and skull presented to the Zoological Society of London by Charles Telfair. In his description, Bennett proposed the genus Propithecus in addition to the species diadema, as he believed that the specimen sufficiently diverged from Lemur to warrant such a designation. The following year, Andrew Smith published a description of a diademed sifaka specimen owned by Jules Verreaux in the South African Quarterly Journal, which he named Macromerus typicus on account of its long legs. Auguste Vinson later described the species as Indris albus in an 1862 edition of the Comptes rendus de l'Académie des Sciences using a specimen that was shot by a member of his entourage in what would later become the Analamazaotra National Park. Vinson divided the modern Indriidae family into three genera; a short-tailed group containing his Indris genus and a long tailed group containing a woolly lemur genus and a western sifaka genus. Indris contained two species, there being the modern Indri indri as Indris niger alongside the diademed sifaka. Vinson referred to his I. albus by the local term for the species, ascribing it the common name simpoune.

Although its early describers considered it to be a specific taxon, the diademed sifaka would later be subsumed as the Propithecus diadema diadema subspecies of a broader P. diadema species. This classification became widely accepted after it was supported by Ernst Schwarz in his 1931 revision of lemur taxonomy. Schwarz's P. diadema also included the silky sifaka (P. candidus) and Milne-Edwards's sifaka as subspecies. An additional subspecies, the black sifaka (P. d. holomelas), was included in this taxonomy but was later described as synonymous with Milne-Edwards's sifaka after Ian Tattersall found the two subspecies to be sympatric. Schwarz's revision was challenged in the 1980s after karyotypic analysis by Yves Rumpler et al. found genetic differences between P. d. edwardsi and other members of the former P. diadema species. Mireya Mayor et al. proposed elevating the eastern subspecies to specific statuses in 2004 due to their allopatric distribution and high degree of genetic distance. This rearrangement was not wholly accepted by the scientific community; Tattersall argued that pelage variation in the Tsinjoarivo Classified Forest population was indicative of insufficient reproductive isolation between the diademed sifaka and Milne-Edwards's sifaka to qualify as separate species without the phylogenetic species concept, and attributed the revision by Mayor et al. to an inflationary trend in lemur taxonomy. In light of these concerns, Mittermeier et al. defended the elevation of the eastern sifakas to specific statuses in the third edition of Lemurs of Madagascar.

The Tsinjoarivo Classified Forest diademed sifaka population possesses anomalous morphological traits, e.g. varying degrees of melanism in some individuals. Some scientists have considered designating this population as a subspecies of P. diadema. Others have described it as a unique species; the Duke Lemur Center named the Tsinjoarivo population P. marshi in 2001. Another hypothesis posited that the Tsinjoarivo population is a spatiogenetically isolated clade of P. diadema that is clinally related to P. edwardsi that bred with an immigrant population of P. diadema males from the north. Subsequent nuclear genome analysis and field observations indicated that this population exhibits a pelage mutation that is not the result of significant genetic isolation, as individuals with standard pelage colorations have been observed to produce melanistic offspring.

== Anatomy and physiology ==
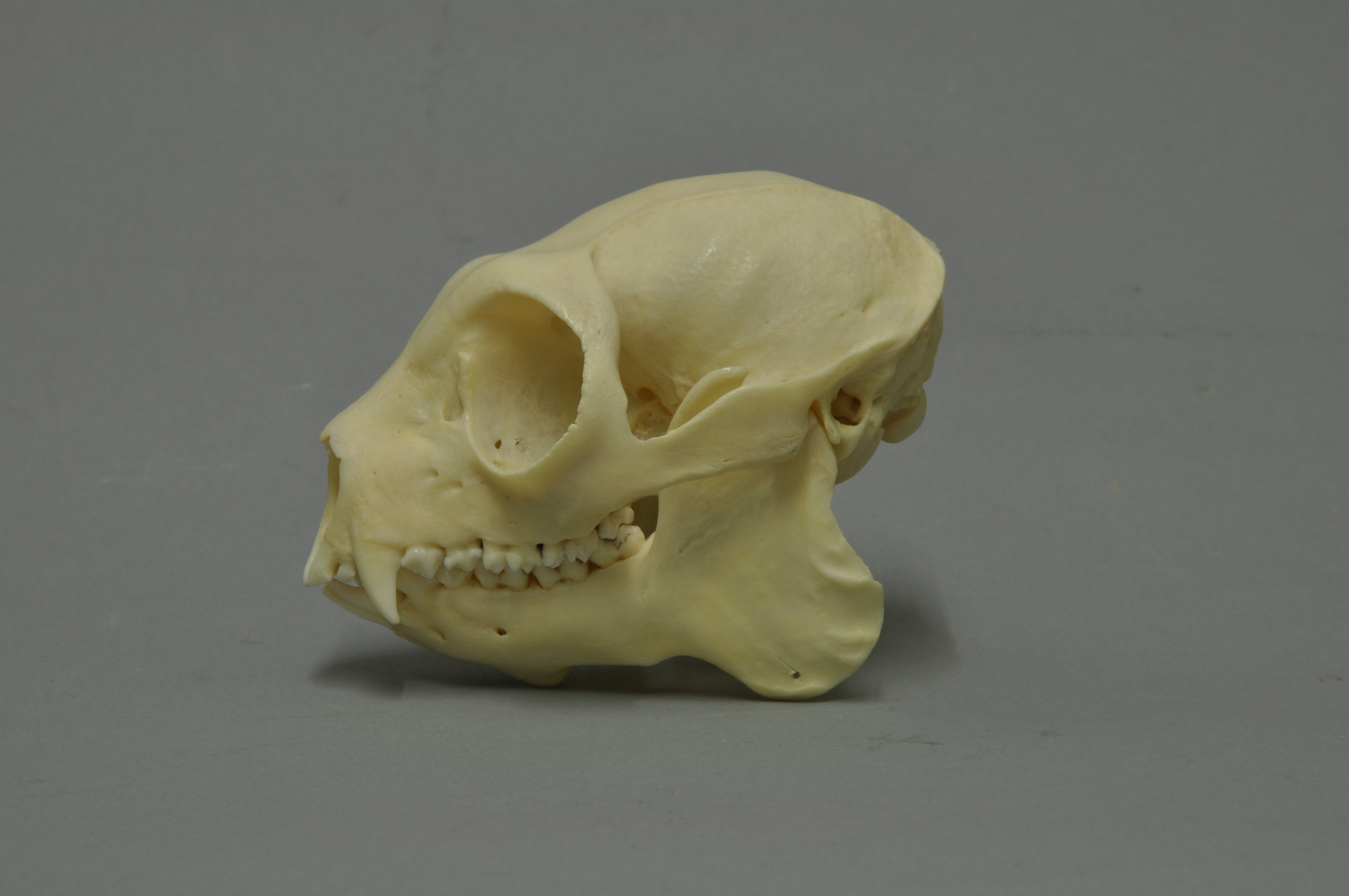
Skull of a diademed sifaka

The diademed sifaka is the largest species of sifaka. It exhibits very little sexual dimorphism, though females tend to be slightly larger and heavier. Males are, on average, 50.1 cm (19.7 in) long, with females averaging 50.9 cm (20.0 in) in length. Tails are typically 47 cm (19 in) long. The species has rather long legs, with an intermembral index of 64. On average, males weigh 6.5 kg (14 lb), whereas females weigh 6.7 kg (15 lb).

The adult brain weighs 37 g (1.3 oz) and has a disproportionately enlarged motor cortex compared to lemurs outside of the Indriidae family. The skull is positioned at a right angle atop the spinal column, which helps the diademed sifaka maintain an upright posture. As a strepsirrhine, it possesses a tapetum lucidum. Its retinas mostly contain rod cells, and the area centralis of the eye is flat. The mandible is robust for a lemur, such that it resembles that of a simian when viewed from the side. Its teeth have high crowns and the molars have long shearing blades, which allow it to efficiently chew its leafy diet. The molars are also bilophodont, a trait that, among primates, is only seen in Indriidae and Old World monkeys. It has a deciduous dental formula of 2.1.22.1.2 × 2 = 20, with many of the deciduous teeth erupting before birth. Scholars such as Madeleine Friant and Adolf Remane have constructed the permanent dental formula as 2.1.2.32.0.2.3 × 2 = 30, which is a reduction of typical lemuroid dentition inasmuch as it lacks permanent lower canines (C_{−}). This has been challenged by William Warwick James and Daris Swindler, who each posited that the deciduous lower canines (dc_{−}) are replaced by incisiform teeth that fulfill the function of two of the lower incisors (I_{2}) in the toothcomb. By this model the dental formula is 2.1.2.31.1.2.3 × 2 = 30. The toothcomb consists of four teeth, which differs from the typical six-toothed toothcomb that is seen in lemurs not belonging to the Indriidae and Daubentoniidae families. The diademed sifaka's possession of two, rather than three, premolars is a uniquely indrisine characteristic among lemurs.

Like all other indriids, the diademed sifaka is a hindgut fermenter. It has a long small intestine that allows it to efficiently digest its fibrous, fat-rich diet while also accommodating for simple carbohydrates. The breakdown of the cell walls of ingested leaves occurs in the cecum, which is both enlarged and highly sacculated to facilitate this process. It lacks any adjacent appendix-like structures like those found in some other strepsirrhines. The diademed sifaka has two colons; the first is arranged as an ovoid spiral known as a tortillon. This shape prevents blockages that could result from the diademed sifaka's voluminous, leafy diet. Beyond the tortillon is a second, dorsal colon that connects to the rectum.

The diademed sifaka is an arboreal vertical clinger and leaper. It has well-developed erector spinae, which are attached to the sacrum via an ossified crest. This grants the diademed sifaka additional control of its vertebrae while leaping. While at rest, it holds its knees to its chest as it clings to a tree for support. It can suspend itself by its feet while foraging but otherwise keeps itself upright. It has an enlarged brachioradialis muscle, which stabilizes the elbow joint during suspensory movements at the cost of a restricted range of motion. The diademed sifaka sometimes descends to the ground to eat, play, or cross gaps in forests, wherein it terrestrially locomotes by bipedally leaping. The hands and feet are long and narrow. The digital formula is 4>3>5>2>1, meaning that the fourth digit is the longest and the first digit is the shortest. All digits except the index finger are webbed about the proximal phalanges. The digital webbing is more pronounced in the feet than in the hands.

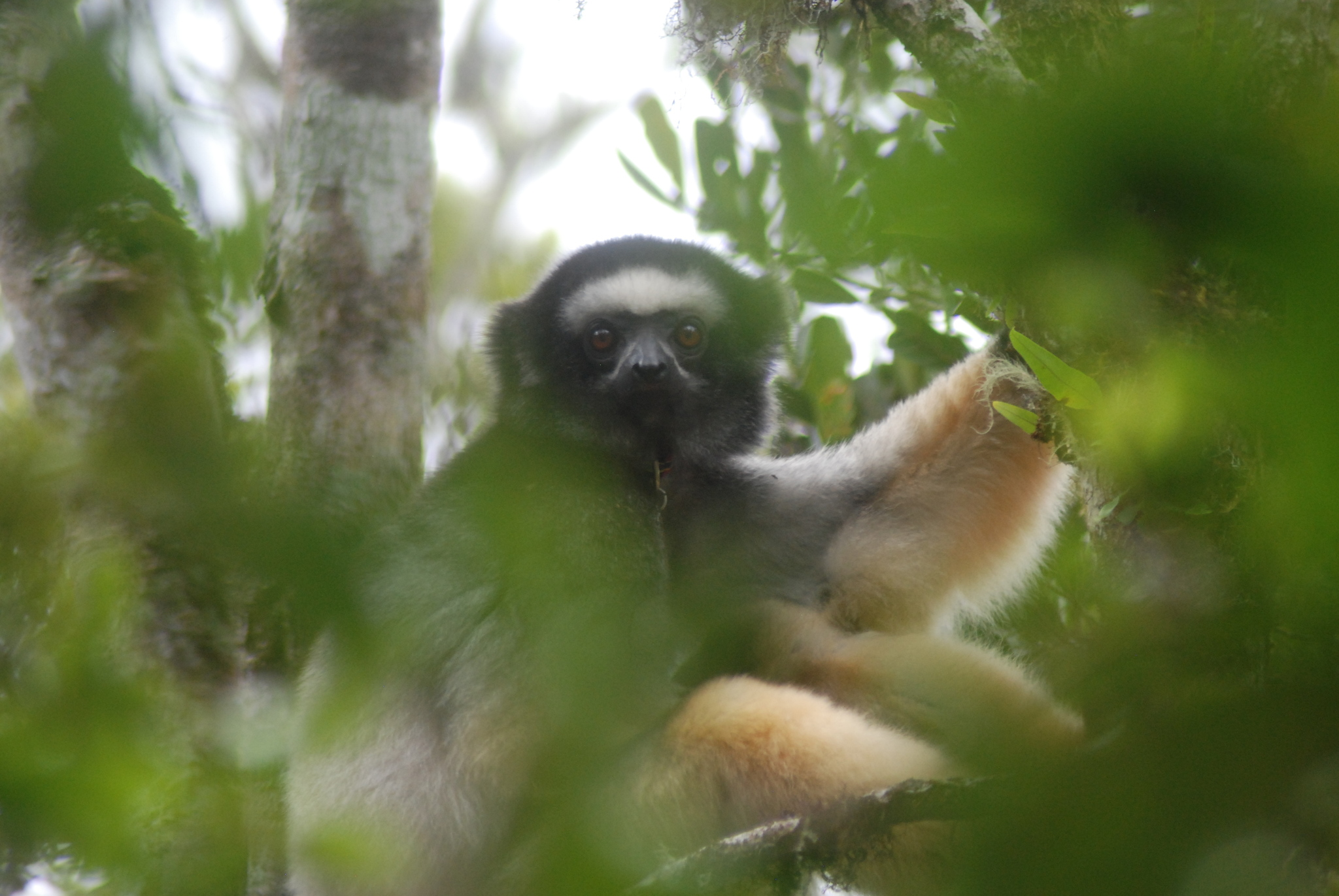
A melanistic individual in the Tsinjoarivo Classified Forest

Its pelage is long and silky. The white frontal band above its eyes engenders a "diadem" appearance, for which it is named. Its eyes are a reddish brown and are framed by prominent dark eyelashes. Its black face appears bald but is actually covered in fine hairs. The lower back, ventral surface, and tail are white. Its hands, feet, and head are slate gray to silvery gray, while its arms, legs, and the base of its tail have a yellowish-golden hue. The male is endowed with a large, reddish brown cutaneous scent gland on the surface of the throat, as well as a similarly-colored patch around the anus that may have a glandular function. Newborn diademed sifakas have solid white pelages. Juveniles typically have paler pelages and yellower frontal bands than adults but are otherwise identical in coloration. Melanistic individuals can be found in fragments of the Tsinjoarivo Classified Forest. This may be an adaptive mechanism for camouflaging in a fragmented habitat where predation rates are higher than in pristine forests. It could also serve as a thermoregulant, as this trait occurs more frequently in populations living at relatively high elevations that experience low rates of annual precipitation. In lemurs, darkened pelage coloration on the forehead and around the periorbital region of the face is associated with living beneath dense forest cover.

== Behavior ==
=== Social structure ===
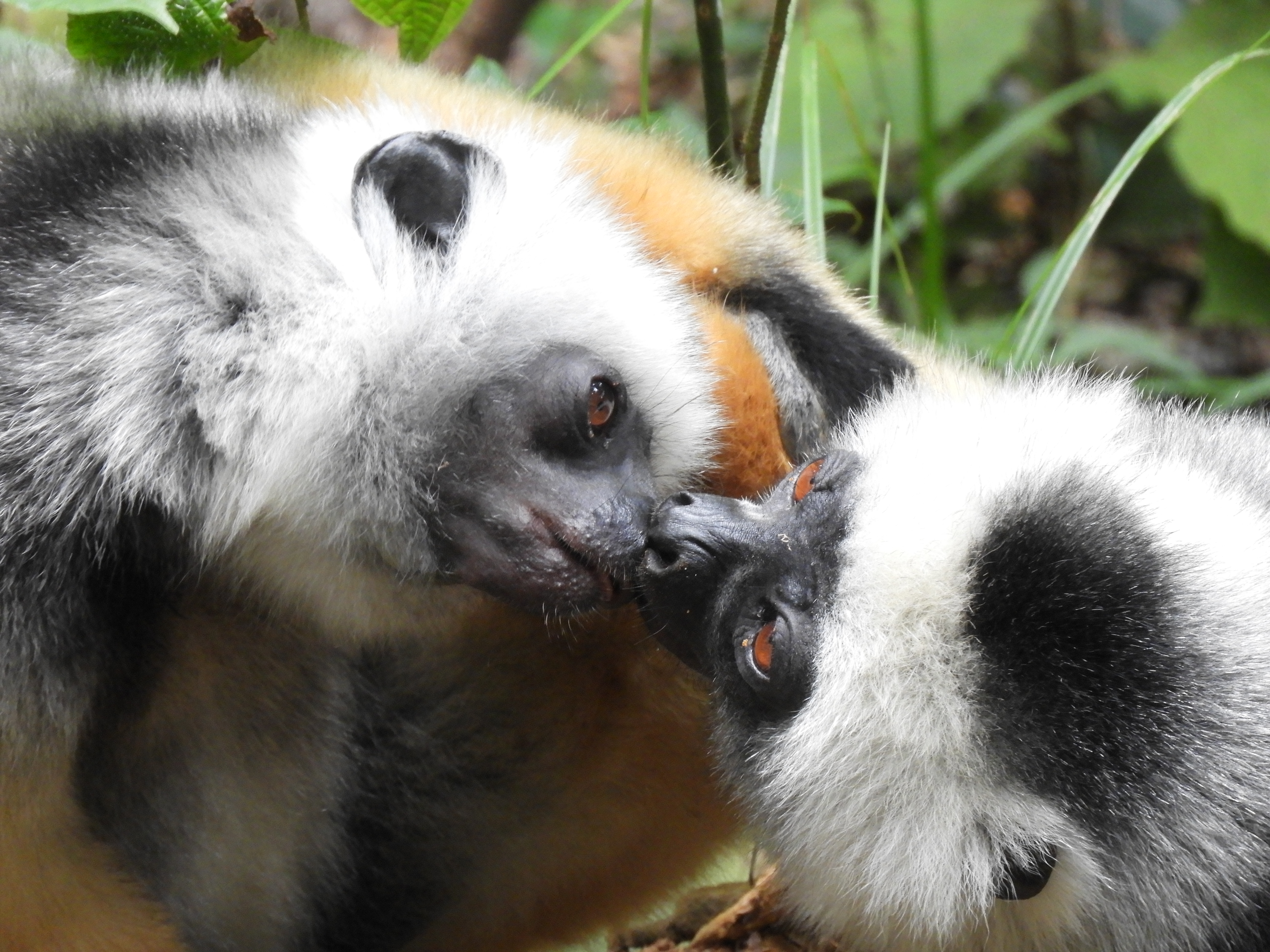
Diademed sifakas are social animals.

Diademed sifaka troops contain two to nine individuals, which may include multiple male and female adults. Troops have home ranges of up to 80 ha (200 acres), which are defended with territorial scent markings by both males and females. Groups will fight if they encounter each other at the perimeters of their territories, with both males and females participating in these confrontations. Despite spending a considerable amount of time patrolling boundaries, intergroup fights are rare due to the diademed sifaka's low population density. It has a typical daily travel length of 1,629 m (1.012 mi). The longest bout of travel usually follows the final feeding of the day, after which a troop moves to the opposite side of its territory to sleep. Group cohesion is correlated with food availability, as fruit scarcity prompts more solitary foraging behaviors. The diademed sifaka will share its territory with other lemur species such as the common brown lemur (Eulemur fulvus), the red-bellied lemur (E. rubriventer), and the indri due to resource partitioning. Play behaviors such as wrestling, leaping, and chasing are commonly displayed by individuals of all ages. Play sessions usually involve an infant or juvenile participating alongside an adult. Diademed sifakas sometimes play with indris.

Breeding females are dominant over males. Males often surrender access to optimal feeding sites to females; if they fail to do so, females are usually successful in displacing them. The hierarchical relationships among breeding males and non-breeding individuals vary between troops and may be influenced by kinship relations. Males have higher rates of agonistic intrasexual interactions than females, and will emigrate from their natal groups at around five years of age. Some females disperse, others are philopatric.

=== Communication ===
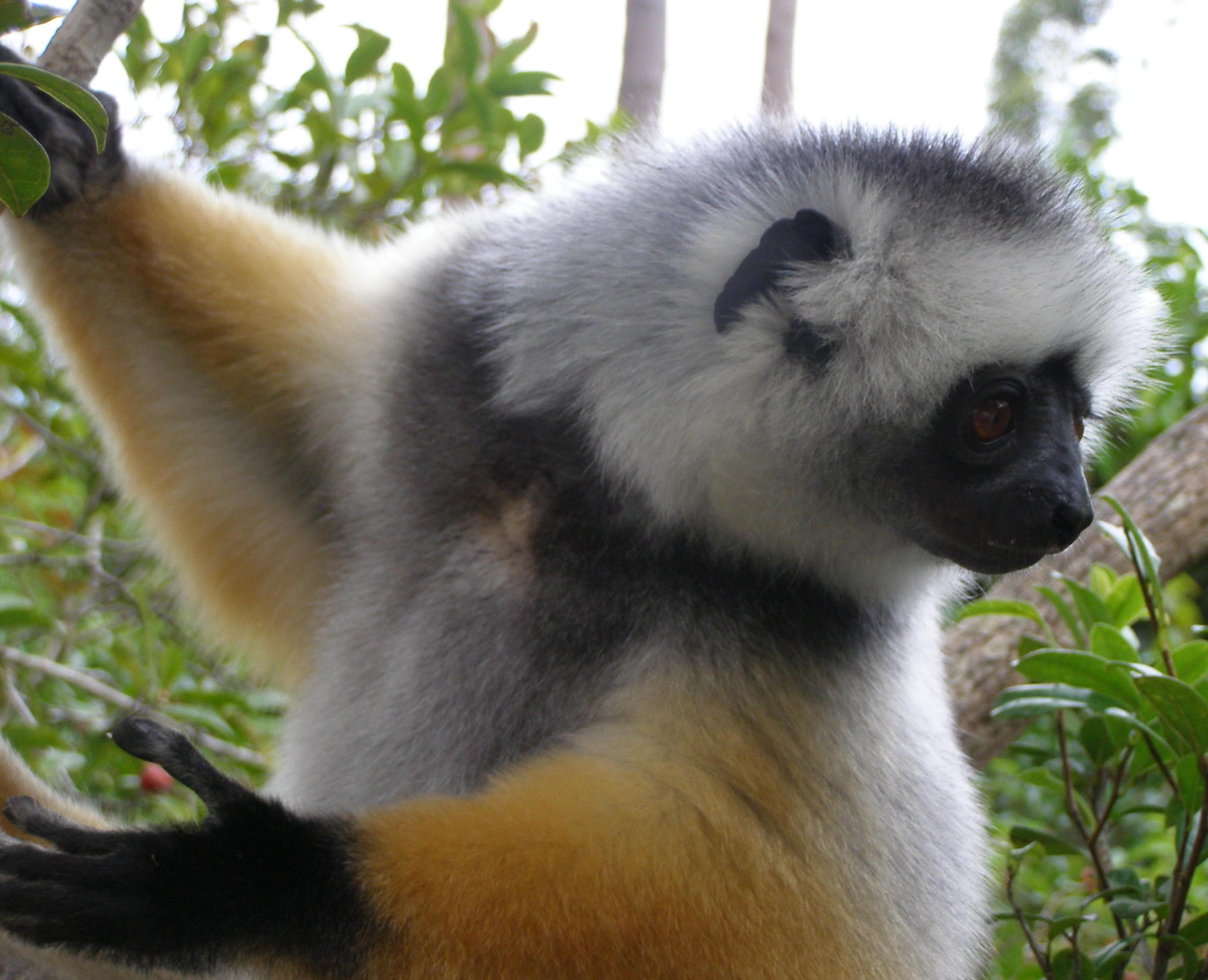
Male displaying sternal pelage discoloration due to his scent gland

The diademed sifaka has a small repertoire of vocalizations compared to most other lemur species. It has been observed to produce aerial predator warning roars almost daily despite the low risk of predation that raptors pose to adults. The contact call is a "roo-han." Sneeze-like "zzuss" alarm vocalizations differ between sexes and individuals.

Olfaction (the sense of smell) plays a prominent role in the social life of the diademed sifaka. Scent glands on the wrists, anus, and the crown of the head are used to secrete oils and sweat to mark oneself or an object with communicative odors. The diademed sifakas does not directly mark conspecifics (other members of the same species). Males possess additional scent glands on the surface of the throat and on the sternum. Males often perform a sequence of different scent-marking behaviors while they deposit odors and will gouge trees with their toothcombs prior to marking with their sternal glands. Dominant individuals scent mark more frequently than subordinates, and males mark twice as often as females. Females utilize genital secretions to produce sexual attractant pheromones. Urine and feces are used to mark trees for delineating territorial boundaries. Rather than evenly distributing territorial markings, individuals pool their markings together in intermittent "totem-trees." Totem-trees are also the sites of competitive overmarking by males, which prevents sexually receptive in-group females from signaling their reproductive statuses to outsiders.

=== Reproduction ===
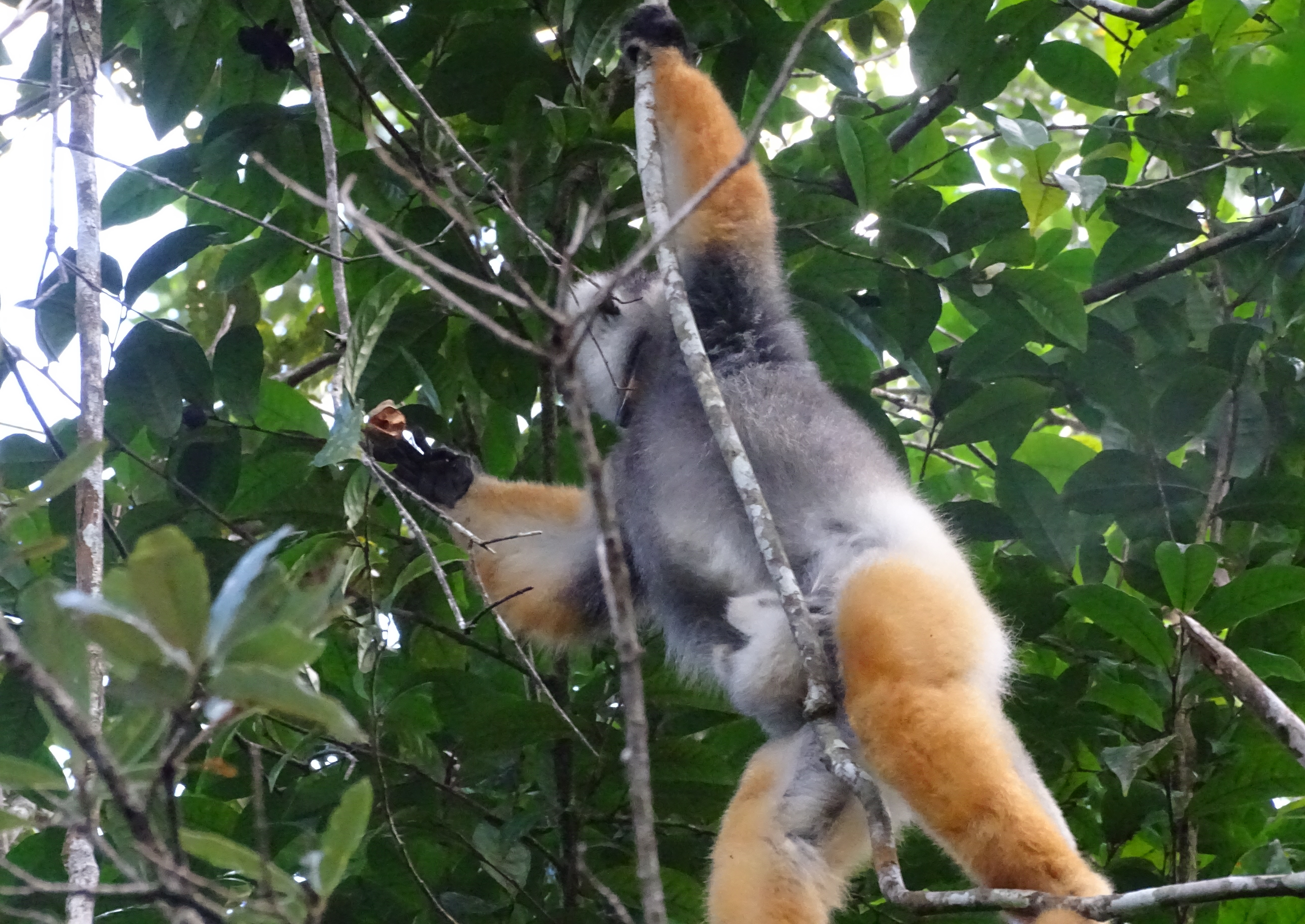
Female with infant

Females are only receptive to mating a few days each year. Estrus is photoperiodic. Copulation occurs between November and January. Males may copulate with breeding females multiple times during the brief estrus period. Female dominance and intrasexual competition may play a significant role in mate selection. Females seek extra-group copulations by depositing scent marks at territorial perimeters while they are in or are approaching estrus. Singleton infants are born between May and August, half of whom do not survive their first year of life. This high rate of infant mortality can be attributed to starvation after weaning in dry years, hypothermia in the dry season, and predation. Males rarely interact with infants and do not defend them from threats. Infanticide has been reported, even in stable groups.

Sexual maturity in males and most females occurs at around five years of age, however some females have given birth at four years. Diademed sifakas can live up to 25 years in the wild, which is indicative of a slower life history than those which are seen in comparable folivorous simians. This is an adaptation to the harsh seasonal environment of eastern Madagascar. Infants are born with many of their deciduous teeth already erupted and some of their permanent molars partially calcified. This enables infants to eat their first solid food at three weeks even though weaning does not conclude until 25 weeks. The staggered timing of birth, weaning, and tooth eruption in the diademed sifaka is associated with the highly seasonal breeding behaviors of females, which ensures that infants and juveniles mature at rates that are consistent with temporal patterns of food availability on the island. This results in a slowed rate of somatic growth (growth of the body) coupled with rapid dental maturation and consequently a long life expectancy.

=== Diet ===
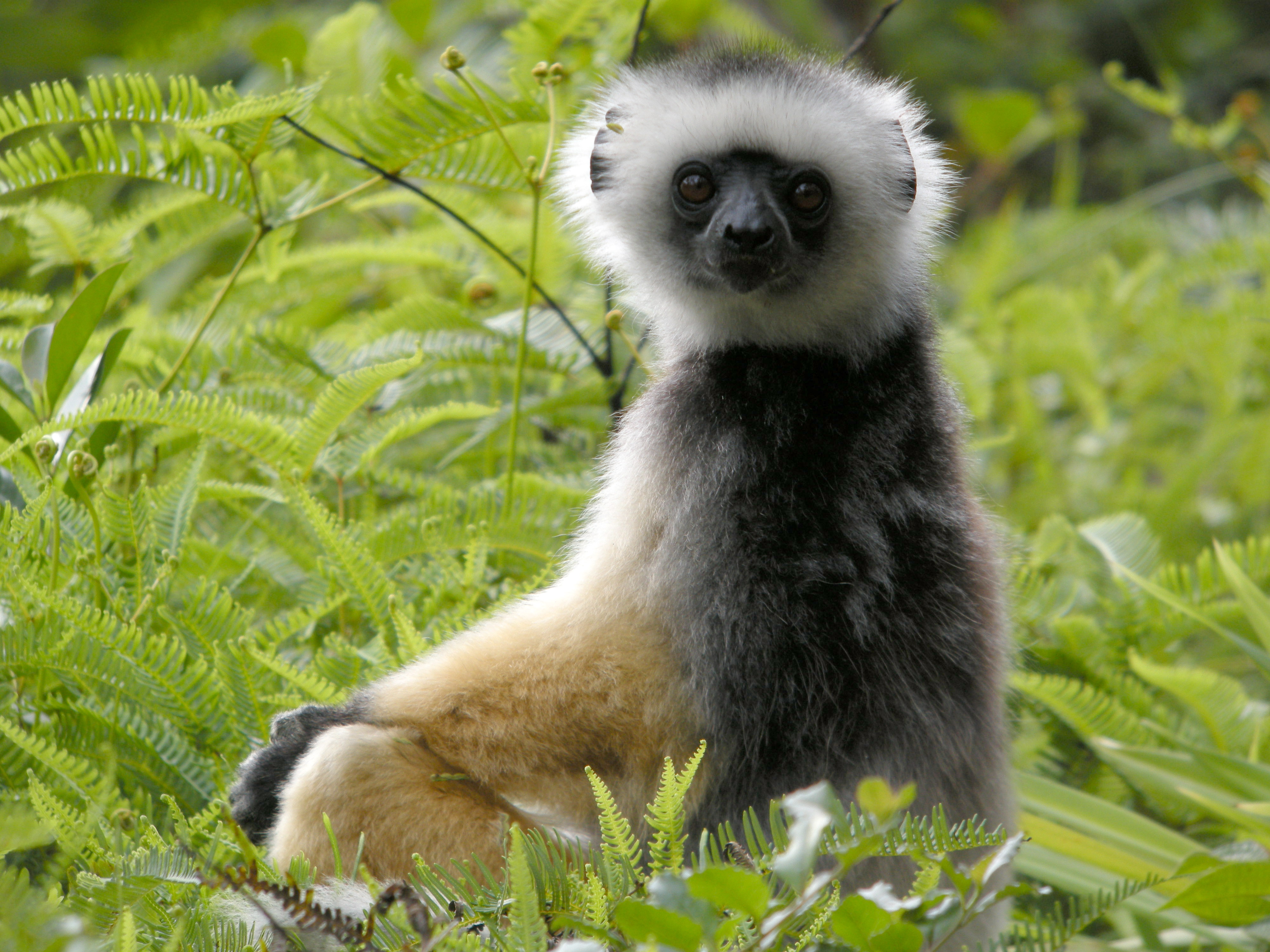
Diademed sifakas are among the few primates that eat ferns.

The diademed sifaka is a folivore that consumes over 25 different plant species every day. It is not an obligate folivore, as it prioritizes the consumption of fruits, seeds, and flowers when they are available. It descends to the ground to eat soil, which plays a role in the detoxification of alkaloids and other harmful compounds in its gut. Ferns are eaten year-round, which is an unusual food item for primates. Xylophagy has been observed in a captive individual. The diademed sifaka relies on epiphytes, lianas, and hemiparasites to acquire dietary minerals, which are especially important during the dry season. It consumes low quantities of calcium, even when compared to the typically hypocalcemiac diets of most lemur species. Calcium-enriched diets have been fatal to captive individuals, indicating that the diademed sifaka is highly efficient in its uptake of minerals, including zinc and iron.

The diet of the diademed sifaka varies in composition and diversity throughout the year. The quality and quantity of foods that are consumed fluctuate in tandem across seasons. The diademed sifaka is almost exclusively folivorous during the dry season, when it mainly consumes leaves from a wide variety of plants. Its dry season, dietary diversity is an adaptation to the greater quantity and potency of secondary metabolites in dry season foods, which limit the amount of any one species that an individual can consume. The Bakerella clavata species of showy mistletoe is the most important fallback food during the dry season due to its high sodium content, though groups that live in forest fragments have been observed to consume it in equal quantities year-round. Flowers and buds may briefly constitute the majority of the diademed sifaka's diet in August and September. Flowers are an especially important resource for females, who spend over twice as much time engaged in florivory as males. During the rainy season the diademed sifaka can spend up to 80% of its feeding time eating fruits and seeds. It consumes small fruits whole, whereas it husks large fruits for their seeds and sometimes eats the discarded remains off the ground. It is a seed predator, as it fully masticates seeds, thereby preventing dispersal. It has a high tolerance for alkaloids and regularly consumes the seeds of alkaloid-rich plants such as Solanum mauritianum and the Protorhus ditimena species of the Protorhus genus.

== Ecology ==
The diademed sifaka has one of the largest ranges among Propithecus species. The species occurs between 200 and 1,600 m (660 and 5,250 ft) in elevation throughout much of the eastern Madagascar lowland forests, though it is most commonly found above 800 m (2,600 ft). Its range extends to at least the Mananara River in the north and to the Onive and Mangoro rivers in the south. It was historically found as far north as the Antainambalana River but has since experienced local extinction in that area. Its population density is estimated to be 2–10 individuals/km^{2}.

The fossa (Cryptoprocta ferox) is the only natural predator of the diademed sifaka, though immature individuals are sometimes targeted by raptors such as the Madagascar harrier-hawk (Polyboroides radiatus). Fossa attacks increase in frequency during the dry season when alternative sources of prey are less readily available due to hibernation. The diademed sifaka faces lower predation rates than other sifaka species due to its large body size and low population density, though it is at a greater risk of predation when living in fragmented habitats due to reduced predator ranges. It is susceptible to parasitism by tapeworms, as well as bacterial infections by Enterobacter, Escherichia coli, and Streptococcus.

== Conservation status ==
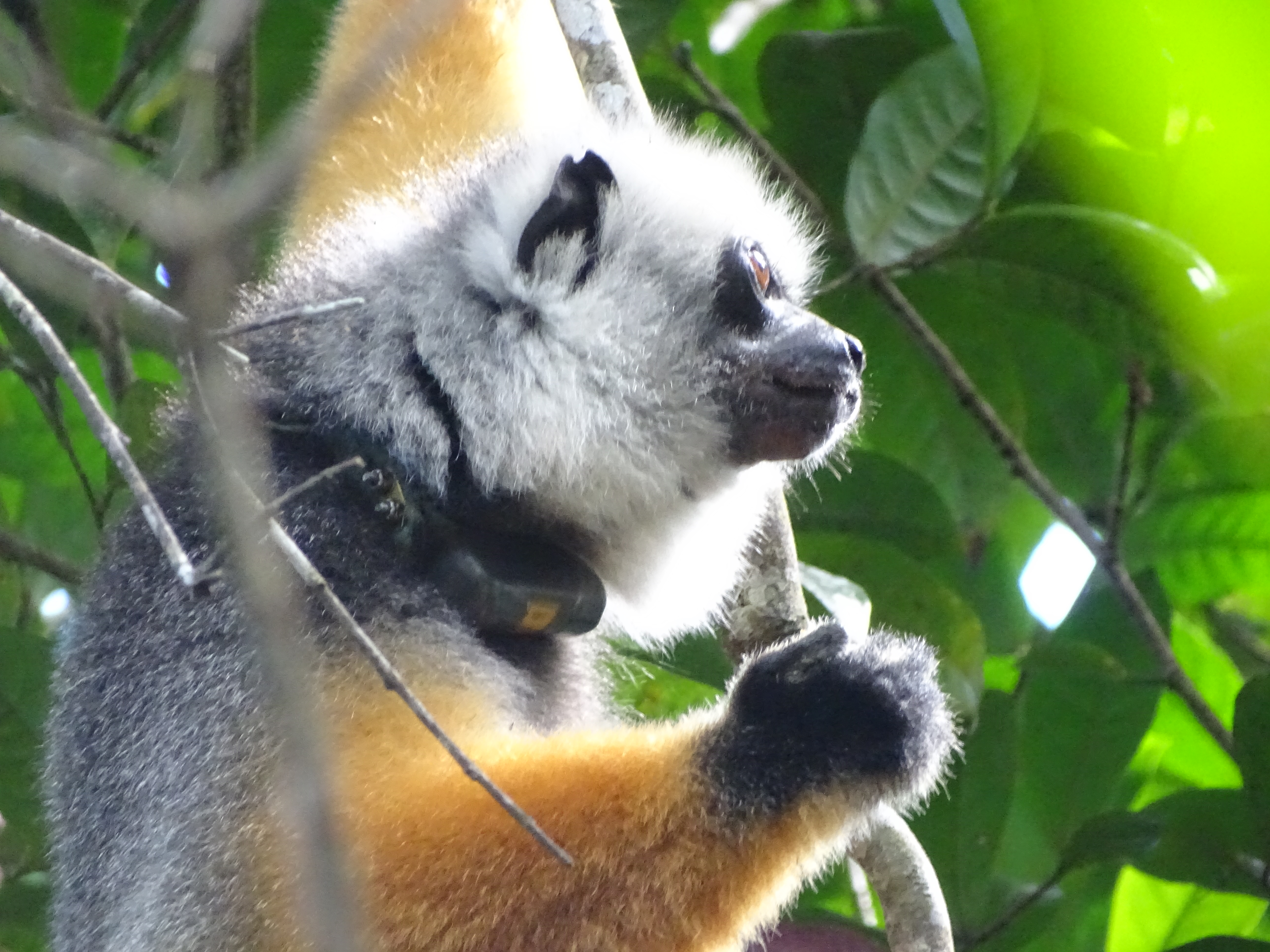
Female with radio collar

The diademed sifaka is classified as critically endangered on the IUCN Red List, and is listed in CITES Appendix I. Threats to the species' survival include habitat reduction due to shifting cultivation, capture for the illegal pet trade, and hunting. These threats are present within and outside of protected areas. Illegal mining, logging for rosewood, ebony, and for latex production, and the farming of sugar cane for illegal rum brewing are major causes of habitat loss in this species' range. Resulting population fragmentation can reduce the viability of future generations of diademed sifakas due to inbreeding depression, which is especially dangerous for its long-term survival because of the species' low population density. Although the diademed sifaka demonstrates remarkable adaptivity in fragmented forest habitats, it still suffers from growth stunting as a result of malnutrition in such environments.

In Malagasy culture many lemur species are protected from human hunting and consumption by taboos known as fady. The extent of this protection varies between localities and species. Typically, sifakas and indris are placed under some of the strictest fady prohibitions because of their anthropomorphic appearance, owing to their large sizes, diurnality, and upright postures. Such attitudes are not uniformly applied to all sifaka species; a study in Alaotra-Mangoro found that less than 10% of surveyed individuals considered the diademed sifaka to be fady, and that 58% of those from rural communities had consumed its meat in their lifetimes.

As of 2012, the wild population is about 6,000 individuals. In 2010 there were only two known diademed sifakas in captivity, one of whom died in 2012. The species is protected in the Mananara-Nord, Andasibe-Mantadia, and Zahamena National Parks, the Betampona, Ambatovaky, Mangerivola, and Marotandrano Reserves, and the Ankeniheny-Zahamena Corridor. Despite its protected status the diademed sifaka is threatened by poaching in these areas, especially in the Ankeniheny-Zahamena Corridor and Andasibe-Mantadia National Park.

In 2007, 25 diademed sifakas that had been rescued from the Ambatovy mine were successfully reintroduced into the Analamazaotra Special Reserve by Edward E. Louis Jr. and a team of Malagasy researchers. Analamazaotra had previously supported a local population that was extirpated 30–40 years prior to the reintroduction. In 2016 the introduced population had grown to 60 individuals.
