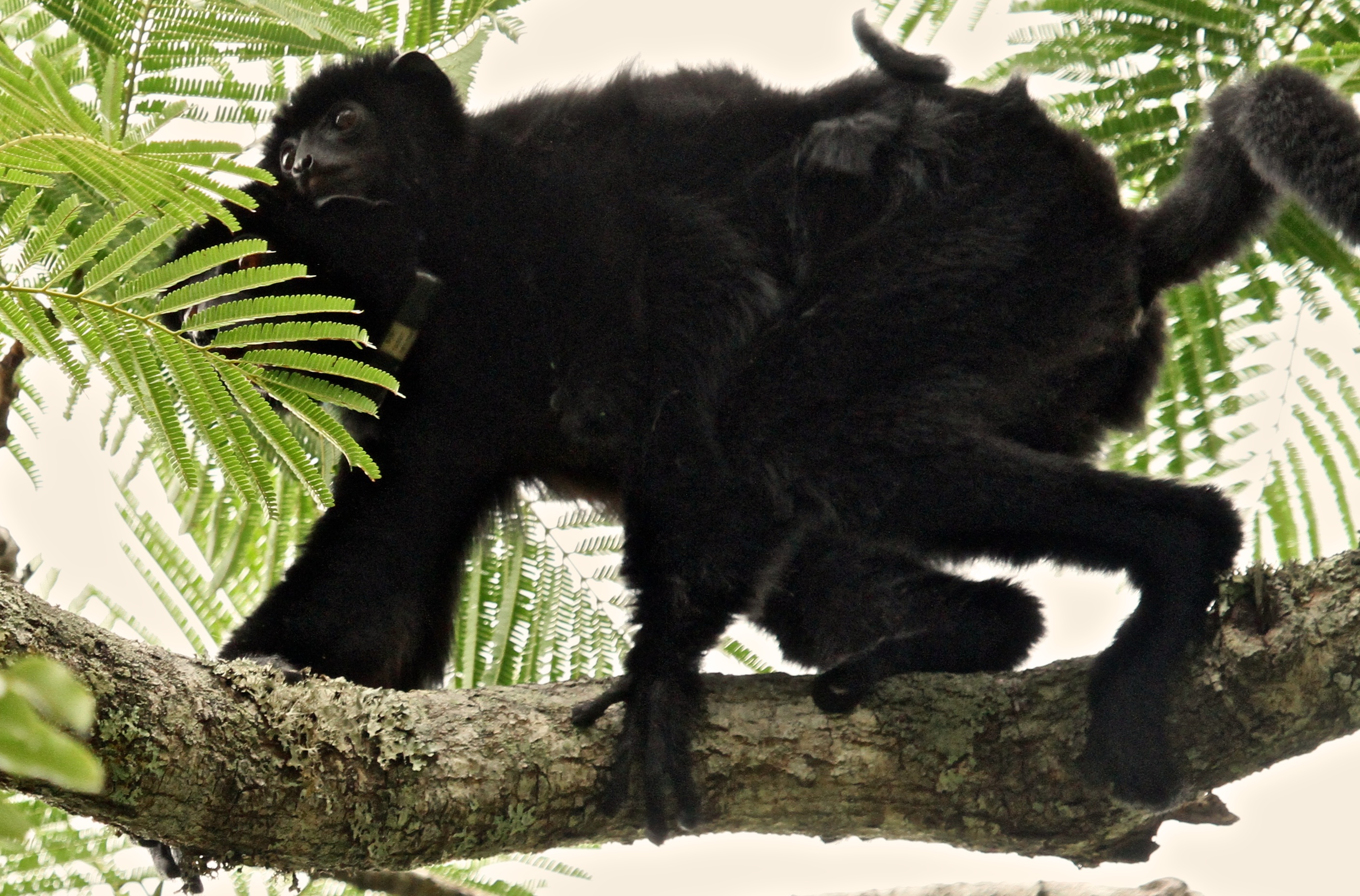

Conservation status
- Critically Endangered (IUCN 3.1)
- CITES Appendix I

Scientific classification
- Kingdom: Animalia
- Phylum: Chordata
- Class: Mammalia
- Order: Primates
- Suborder: Strepsirrhini
- Family: Indriidae
- Genus: Propithecus
- Species: P. perrieri

Binomial name
- Propithecus perrieri Lavauden, 1931
- Distribution of P. perrieri

= Perrier's sifaka =

Species of lemur

Perrier's sifaka (Propithecus perrieri) is a species of lemur endemic to fragmented deciduous dry forests in northern Madagascar. As the smallest of the eastern sifakas of the P. diadema species group, Perrier's sifaka has a head-body length of 85–92 centimeters (33–36 in) and a 42–46 cm (17–18 in) tail, with body weights ranging between 4.3 and 5.0 kg (9.5 and 11.0 lb). With the exception of a rosy-brown tint on the ventral coat, the pelage is wholly black. The eyes are brown and forward-facing. Perrier's sifaka processes its voluminous folivorous diet with an enlarged cecum and two large intestines. For most of the 20th century, it was considered to be a subspecies of the diademed sifaka. It was controversially elevated to specific status on account of mitochondrial evidence published in the early 2000s.

Perrier's sifaka lives in small, matriarchal groups of two to six individuals. It is found at a high population density compared to other eastern sifakas due to the reduced sizes of its home ranges. Populations are heavily concentrated in areas with sandstone soil. Females are seasonal breeders, being receptive to mating for only a short time each year. The species suffers from high rates of infant mortality due to mother Perrier's sifakas' "bet-hedging" strategies, whereby they prioritize their own survival over their offsprings'. Dietary patterns change based on the season, with frugivory being practiced more frequently during the wet season and folivory being more common in the dry season.

The IUCN Red List classifies Perrier's sifaka as a critically-endangered species, and it is listed under CITES Appendix I. The estimated wild population is less than 500 individuals. It is primarily threatened by habitat destruction due to bush fires created for shifting agriculture, and deforestation for the production of charcoal and for the creation of mines. Poaching is also a threat, despite the presence of traditional taboos known as fady that proscribe hunting or consuming the species. Perrier's sifaka frequently descends to the ground to access drinking water from riverbeds, which makes it vulnerable to hunting during the dry season. Perrier's sifaka was previously much more widely distributed prior to the mid-Holocene, however a combination of climatic and anthropogenic factors resulted in its current distribution. It has never been kept in captivity.

== Etymology ==
Perrier's sifaka was named in honor of Henri Perrier de La Bâthie by Louis Lavauden in 1931. The term "sifaka" is derivative of the terrestrial alarm vocalization produced by species of western sifakas belonging to the Propithecus verreauxi group. Because Perrier's sifaka belongs to the eastern (P. diadema) group, it does not produce such a vocalization.

The Antankarana people refer to the species as radjako, rajako, jakoe, or jakoey in honor of a legendary hero of the same name from whom they traditionally believe Perrier's sifakas are descended. An alternative narrative states that Radjako was a man who was hit with a spoon by his wife, which transformed him into a Perrier's sifaka. Elsewhere in Madagascar, Radjako appears in similar etiological myths for other lemur species, including the ring-tailed lemur (Lemur catta) and the indri (Indri indri). Radjako was borrowed into French as jacquot as a derogatory term for lemurs. Further derivations of jacquot may be found in Bourbonnais Creole and Comorian languages.

Perrier's sifaka is also known as ankomba joby, which is Malagasy for "black lemur." Ankomba is a derivation of the Swahili word komba, which means galago.

== Taxonomy ==
Perrier's sifaka belongs to the P. diadema group of eastern sifakas within the Propithecus genus. Like all eastern sifakas except for Milne-Edwards's sifaka (P. edwardsi), it has a somatic number of 2n = 42. 18 autosomal chromosomes are metacentric, 14 are submetacentric, and eight are acrocentric. The X chromosome is metacentric, and the Y chromosome is acrocentric. Perrier's sifaka could have previously had two additional acrocentric chromosomes that underwent a Robertsonian translocation, resulting in a metacentric chromosome.

=== Changes in taxonomy ===
Like other eastern sifakas, Perrier's sifaka was previously considered to be a subspecies of a broader P. diadema species that also included the silky sifaka (P. candidus), the diademed sifaka (P. diadema), and Milne-Edwards's sifaka. This consolidation of the eastern sifakas into a single species was widely accepted following the publication of Ernst Schwarz's 1931 revision of lemur taxonomy. A fifth subspecies known as the black sifaka (P. d. holomelas) was recognized prior to the 1980s, but was considered synonymous with Milne-Edwards's sifaka after Ian Tattersall found the two subspecies to be sympatric. Perrier's sifaka was considered by Glover Morrill Allen to be a melanistic form of Coquerel's sifaka (P. coquereli; then known as P. v. coquereli), however Allen's arrangement was abandoned by the time of William Charles Osman Hill's seminal 1953 publication, Primates: Comparative Anatomy and Taxonomy, which categorized Perrier's sifaka as a subspecies of the diademed sifaka.

Schwarz's broad P. diadema species classification was largely abandoned due to mitochondrial evidence found by Mireya Mayor et al. which indicated that the genetic distance between the four subspecies confirmed their specific status, as defined by the phylogenetic species concept. Tattersall later questioned the conclusions of Mayor et al., and attributed the elevation of P. perrieri to specific status to an inflationary trend in lemur taxonomy.

== Description ==
Perrier's sifaka is the smallest eastern sifaka. It has a body length of 85–92 centimeters (33–36 in) with a 42–46 cm (17–18 in) tail. It weighs between 4.3 and 5.0 kg (9.5 and 11.0 lb).

Its skull is shorter and wider than other eastern sifakas'. It has small, brown, forward-facing eyes. The salivary glands are very large. Its deciduous dental formula is 2.1.22.1.2. The deciduous incisors erupt before birth. Adolf Remane interpreted the permanent dental formula as 2.1.2.32.0.2.3, wherein the lower deciduous canines are not replaced. Other scholars, such as William Warwick James and Daris Swindler, have argued that the lower deciduous canines are instead replaced by an incisor-like tooth, and that it is two of the lower deciduous incisors that are not replaced, giving the appearance of 2.1.2.32.0.2.3 despite being 2.1.2.31.1.2.3. In either case, Perrier's sifaka differs from lemurs outside of the Indriidae and Daubentoniidae families in that its toothcomb consists of four, rather than six, incisor-shaped teeth, and it has two, rather than three, permanent premolars.

Its pelage is almost entirely black, although the ventral coat and shoulder have a rose-brown tint. The dorsal coat is dense and silky, while the ventral aspect of the coat tends to have shorter fur. All but the face is furred, though some individuals' ears are bald.

The digestive tract of Perrier's sifaka includes a long cecum without an appendix or appendix-like structure. The cecum typically exceeds the body length of an adult, though it is relatively smaller in immature individuals. The cecum has three rows of sacculations, which do not develop until after birth. Perrier's sifaka has two colons; the first is arranged as a large, oval-shaped spiral called a tortillon. This differs from the smaller, corkscrew-shaped spirals seen in the colons of strepsirrhines outside of family Indriidae. The tortillon's shape may play a role in preventing blockages that could result from the species' voluminous diet. Beyond the tortillon is a dorsal second colon, which terminates into the rectum without structural demarcation. Overall, the lower gastrointestinal tract of Perrier's sifaka is about nine times an individual's body length.

== Behavior ==
=== Social Structure ===
Perrier's sifakas live in groups of two to six individuals. Dispersal rates are common between both sexes. Groups maintain stable territories, and encounter other groups at rates which are tied to population densities and the sizes of home ranges. It lives in matriarchal societies, although males are sometimes able to usurp feeding priority from females of subordinate social status. The home ranges of Perrier's sifakas are less than 30 hectares (74 acres) in size, differing from the typically larger home ranges of fellow sifakas in the eastern P. diadema group. Consequently, Perrier's sifaka occurs at a higher population density than other eastern sifakas, with an average density 8.78 lemurs/km^{2} calculated across eight different sites. Population densities in areas with sandstone soil are more than twice those of areas with limestone soil.

=== Reproduction ===
Like many lemur species, Perrier's sifaka is a seasonal breeder. The bodies of infant Perrier's sifakas develop slowly compared to other folivorous primates, although their teeth mature rapidly. Rapid dental maturation allows infants to quickly develop dietary independence from their mothers, which reduces the mother's metabolic cost for rearing her offspring. The highly seasonal breeding behavior of the species sets up weaning to occur during March, when food resources are most abundant. Infant mortality is high among Perrier's sifakas, as mothers follow a "bet-hedging" strategy wherein they prioritize their own survival by reducing their investment in the survivability of their offspring.

=== Diet ===
The diet of Perrier's sifaka resembles those of other sifaka species, consisting of fruit, leaves, flowers, buds, petioles, and seeds. Like other sifakas, Perrier's sifaka exhibits seasonal dietary variation. During the wet season, it spends about 70 to 90% of its feeding time consuming fruits and seeds, whereas most of the species' feeding time is spent eating leaves and flowers in the dry season. Food items that are consumed by P. perrieri include the flowers of mango trees (Mangifera indica), tamarind (Tamarindus indica) and fig (Ficus pachyclada) fruit, and the leaves of bully trees (Sideroxylon sp.), mainbovitsika (Pittosporum ochrosiifolium), jobiampototra (Diospyros sp.), and kimbimba (Olax sp.). Unlike other sifakas, Perrier's sifaka regularly descends to the ground to drink water from riverbeds.

== Distribution and habitat ==
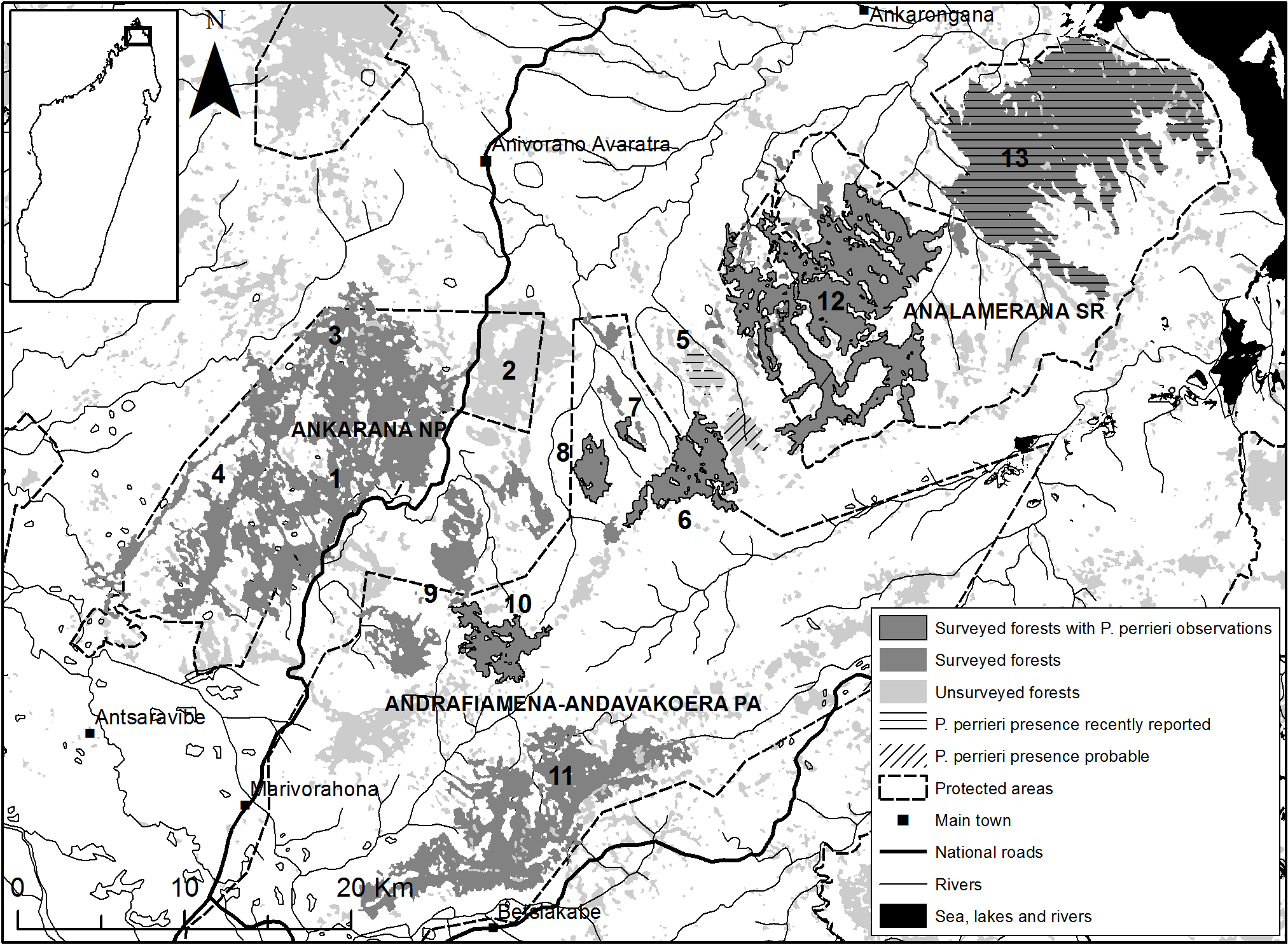
2012 survey of Perrier's sifaka distribution

Perrier's sifaka has a very limited and fragmented distribution in the dry deciduous and semihumid forests of northeastern Madagascar. The primary component of its range is found between the Irodo and Loky Rivers. To the east, its range extends to the edges of the limestone massif of the Analamerana Special Reserve, and to the west it reaches the peaks of Ambohibe, northeast of Marivorahona. It occurs between sea level and 400 meters (1,300 ft) above sea level. A discontinuous population composed of at least two social groups is found in the Andavakoera Forest, south of the Andrafiamena mountains.

=== Past distribution ===
In contrast to the other sifaka species, the golden-crowned sifaka (P. tattersalli) and Perrier's sifaka have disjunct and restricted distributions in northern Madagascar, far removed from the ranges of their congeners. Skeletal remains attributed to western sifakas of the P. verreauxi group and the eastern sifakas of the P. diadema group were found in Ankarana, with P. diadema-group remains also being reported at Andavakoera. This subfossil evidence suggests that the paleodistributions of the golden-crowned sifaka and Perrier's sifaka were much wider than they are today, and were possibly overlapping.

Perrier's sifaka was last observed in the Ankarana Special Reserve in the 1990s, and has not been recorded there since.

=== Demographic History ===
Perrier's sifaka underwent a major demographic decline after the mid-Holocene transition about 5,000 years ago. While this climatic transition alone would have triggered major demographic changes in many lemur species in northern Madagascar, early human settlements likely played an additional role in the loss and fragmentation of the forest cover in the past four millennia.

== Conservation status ==
Perrier's sifaka is one of the most endangered primates in the world due to the limited distribution and low population density. It is listed in CITES Appendix I, and is classified as a critically-endangered species by the IUCN Red List. The greatest threat to the survival of the species is habitat destruction due to shifting agriculture, whereby bush fires are created to renew pastures for livestock grazing, and deforestation for the production of charcoal and for creating mines.

Poaching further endangers the species. Perrier's sifaka is typically hunted with slingshots or hunting dogs. Some species of lemur are traditionally protected from hunting by taboos known as fady, which proscribe the harming or consumption of certain species. Perrier's sifaka receives a substantially greater amount of protection from poaching due to fady than the neighboring silky sifaka. Nevertheless, the hunting of Perrier's sifaka for food occurs despite the taboo, especially in areas such as the Analamerana Special Reserve, where the traditional taboo system is being eroded. Fady is sometimes circumvented by purchasing the meat of Perrier's sifaka from a poacher, without having hunted the animal oneself. The species is especially vulnerable to poaching during the dry season, when it travels across the ground to access drinking water, thereby becoming conspicuous to hunters in the seasonally reduced foliage.

The wild population is estimated by the IUCN to be less than 500 individuals. Perrier's sifaka has never been kept in captivity. It is protected in the Analamerana Special Reserve and in the Andriafiamena-Andavakoera Protected Area, however it occurs outside of conservation areas as well. Because of the species' increased population density in areas with sandstone soil, the protection of such sites is essential its survival.
