= South African Quarterly Journal =

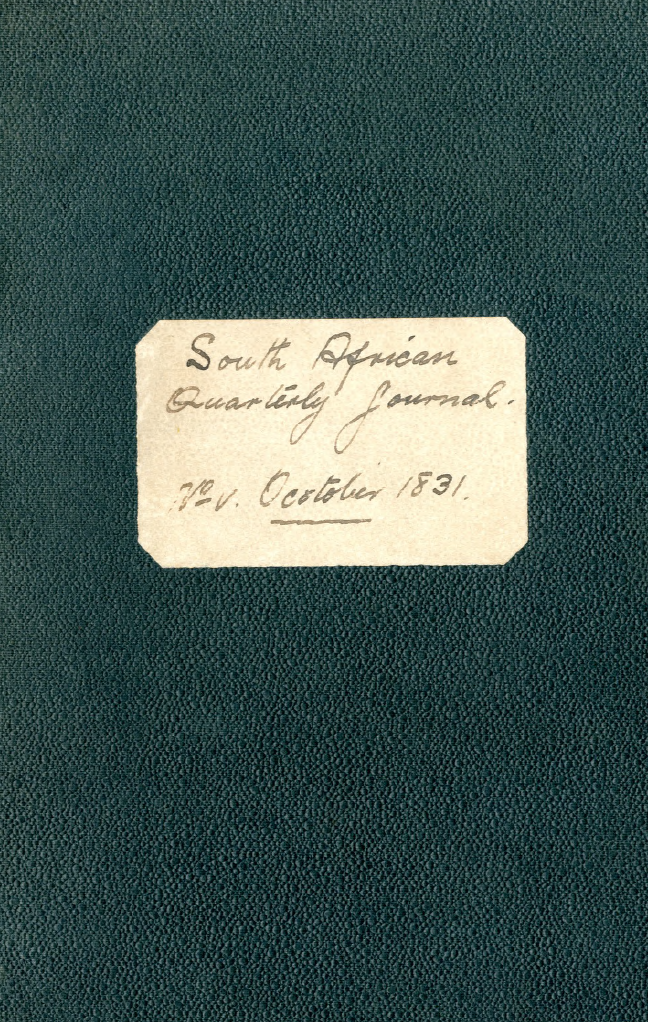
- Discipline: Natural sciences
- Language: English

Publication details
- History: 1830-1836
- Publisher: South African Institution (South Africa)
- Frequency: Irregular
- Open access: Public Domain

Standard abbreviations
- ISO 4: S. Afr. Q. J.

Indexing
- OCLC no.: 38059965
- Online archive

The South African Quarterly Journal (SAQJ) was a landmark early academic publication in the Cape Colony. It is recognised as one of the first scholarly journals in the region, established by Andrew Smith and James Adamson, providing a crucial platform for local scholarly research and research dissemination in the early 19th century.

It was initially published by the South African Institution, and after 1832 under the auspices of the South African Literary and Scientific Institution (SALSI), which had been formed by the 1832 amalgamation of the South African Institution and the South African Literary Society.

== Journal Scope ==
The journal ran for a brief period, approximately from 1830 to 1836, and was published irregularly.

=== Focus and Content ===
The journal’s primary goal was to collect, record, and disseminate original research about Southern Africa to both local and international audiences. Its content spanned a diverse range of disciplines, including: Natural History: Extensive papers on zoology (e.g., descriptions of Southern African fauna), ornithology, and botany; Ethnology: Observations and reports on the local Indigenous populations (such as the San people/Bushmen), which informed contemporary British ethnological debates; Geography and Exploration: Accounts from travellers and explorers in the interior; Horticulture and General History; and Crime in the Colony.

=== Key Contributions and Influence ===
The SAQJ served as the initial publication outlet for several important colonial-era naturalists and explorers. Dr. Andrew Smith, a key figure and Secretary of the publishing institution (SALSI), Smith contributed significant early scientific papers, including detailed reports on the ornithology (bird life) of the region. The journal filled a major void, enabling scholars to publish their findings in the Cape rather than having to wait for publication in journals in Britain or Europe, thus accelerating the global communication of knowledge about Southern Africa.

=== Decline and Legacy ===
The journal ceased publication around 1836. While the exact reasons for its closure are complex, historians attribute the cessation of the journal directly to the subsequent decline and eventual dissolution of its parent body, the South African Literary and Scientific Institution (SALSI). Despite its short lifespan, the SAQJ is viewed as a pioneering effort in South African academic publishing. It set a precedent for localised, scholarly production that would later be carried on by institutions like the South African Philosophical Society (established in 1877). Due to its historical importance, the full run of the journal is now available in digitised form through the Biodiversity Heritage Library and Rhodes University, preserving this primary historical record.
