= Taxonomy of lemurs =

Scientific classification of lemurs

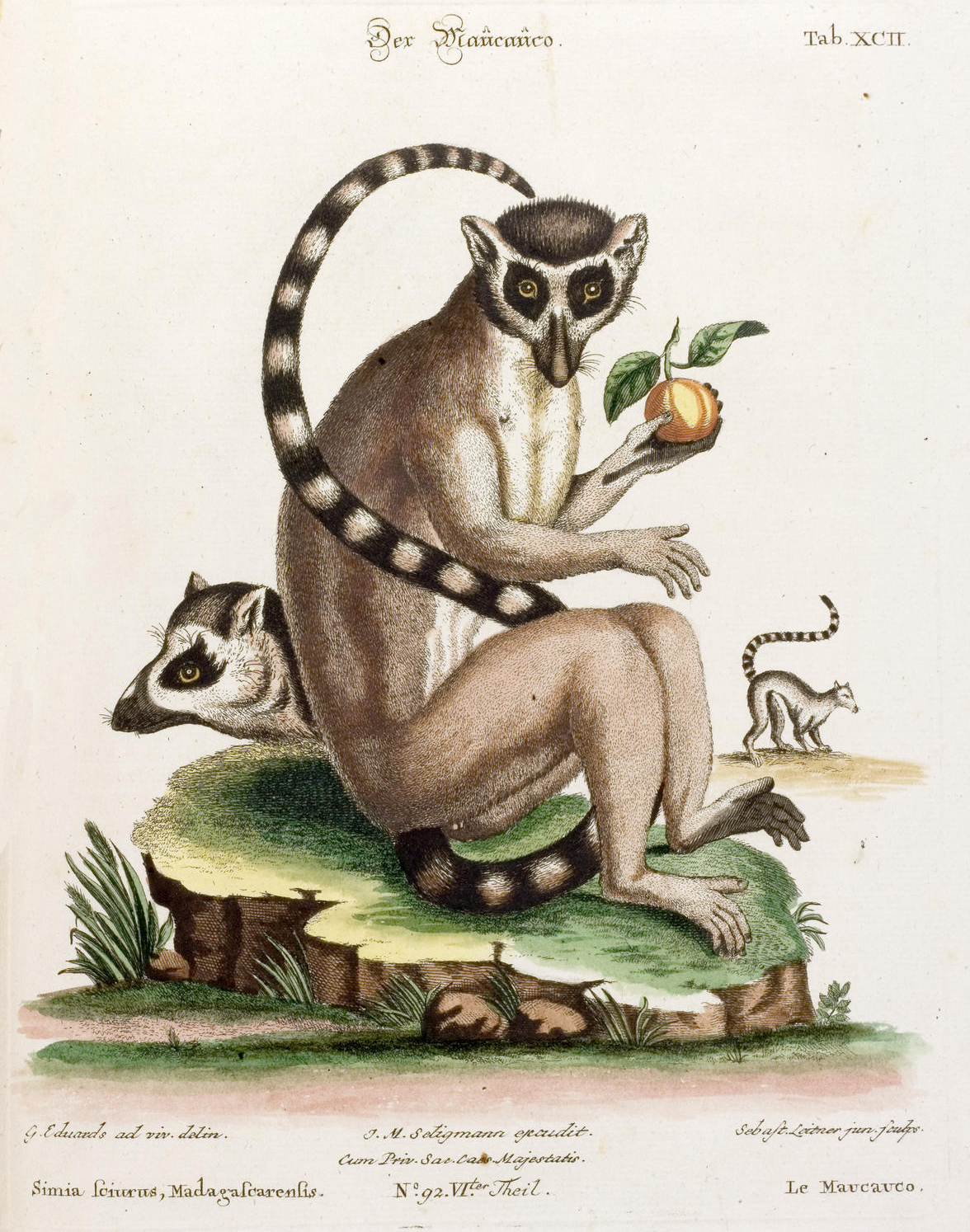
The ring-tailed lemur was one of the first lemurs to be classified, by Carl Linnaeus in 1758.

Lemurs were first classified in 1758 by Carl Linnaeus, and the taxonomy remains controversial today, with approximately 70 to 112 species and subspecies recognized, depending on how the term "species" is defined. Having undergone their own independent evolution on Madagascar, lemurs have diversified to fill many ecological niches normally filled by other types of mammals. They include the smallest primates in the world, and once included some of the largest. Since the arrival of humans approximately 2,000 years ago, lemurs have become restricted to 10% of the island, or approximately 60,000 square kilometers (23,000 sq mi), and many face extinction. Concerns over lemur conservation have affected lemur taxonomy, since distinct species receive increased conservation attention compared to subspecies.

The relationship between the aye-aye and the rest of the lemurs has had the greatest impact on lemur taxonomy at the family rank and above. Genetic analysis of this relationship has also clarified lemur phylogeny and supports the hypothesis that lemurs rafted to Madagascar. Despite general agreement on phylogeny, the taxonomy is still under debate. At the genus level, the taxonomy has been relatively stable since 1931, but a number of additional genera have been recognized since then.

Since the 1990s, there has been a steep increase in the number of recognized lemur species and subspecies through the discovery of new species, the elevation of existing subspecies to full species status, and the recognition of new species among previously known populations that were not even distinct subspecies. Currently living lemur species are divided into five families and 15 genera. If the extinct subfossil lemurs are included, three families, eight genera, and 17 species would be added to the count. The recent rise in species numbers is due to both improved genetic analysis and a push in conservation to encourage the protection of isolated and distinct lemur populations. Not everyone in the scientific community supports these taxonomic changes, with some preferring instead an estimate of 50 living species.

== Background ==
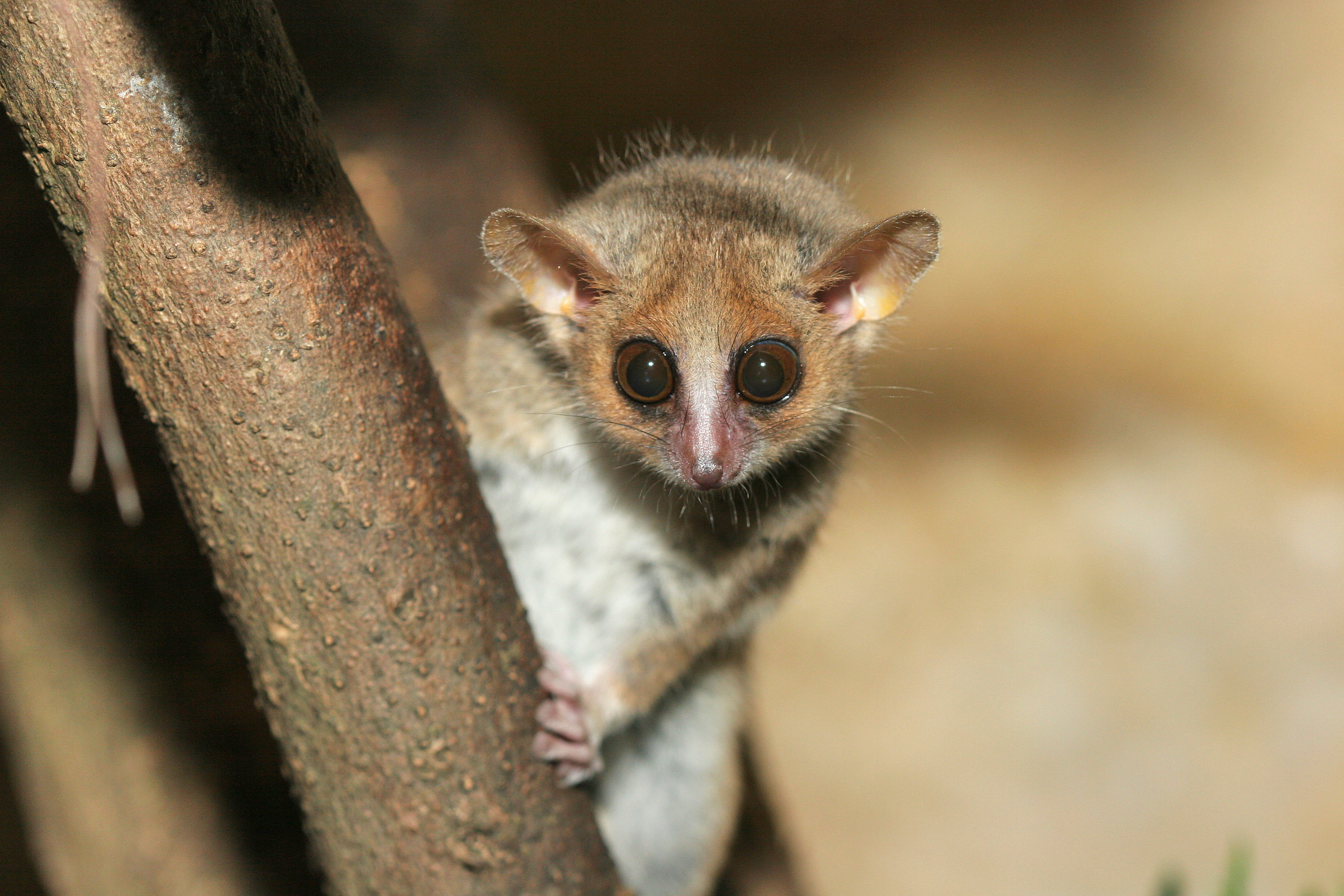
The mouse lemurs are the smallest primates in the world and also one of the most speciose of lemur genera.

Since their arrival on Madagascar, a biogeographically isolated island with a unique mammalian fauna, lemurs have diversified both in behavior and morphology. Their diversity rivals that of the monkeys and apes found throughout the rest of the world, especially when the recently extinct subfossil lemurs are considered. Ranging in size from the 30 g (1.1 oz) Madame Berthe's mouse lemur, probably the world's smallest primate, to the extinct 160–200 kg (350–440 lb) Archaeoindris fontoynonti, the largest known prosimian, lemurs evolved diverse forms of locomotion, varying levels of social complexity, and unique adaptations to the local climate. They went on to fill many niches normally occupied by monkeys, squirrels, woodpeckers, and large grazing ungulates. In addition to the incredible diversity between lemur families, there has also been great diversification among closely related lemurs.

The arrival of humans on the island 1,500 to 2,000 years ago has taken a significant toll, not only on the size of lemur populations, but also on their diversity. Due to habitat destruction and hunting, at least 17 species and 8 genera have gone extinct and many others have become threatened. Historically, lemurs ranged across the entire island inhabiting a wide variety of habitats, including dry deciduous forests, lowland forests, spiny thickets, subhumid forests, montane forest, and mangrove. Today, their collective range is restricted to 10% of the island, or approximately 60,000 km^{2} (23,000 mi^{2}). Most of the remaining forests and lemurs are found along the periphery of the island. The center of the island, the Hauts-Plateaux, was converted by early settlers to rice paddies and grassland through slash-and-burn agriculture, known locally as tavy. As erosion depleted the soil, the cyclical forest regrowth and burning ended as the forest gradually failed to return. In 2008, 41% of all lemur taxa were threatened with extinction while 42% were classified on the IUCN Red List as "Data Deficient".

== Overview of taxonomic and phylogenetic classification ==
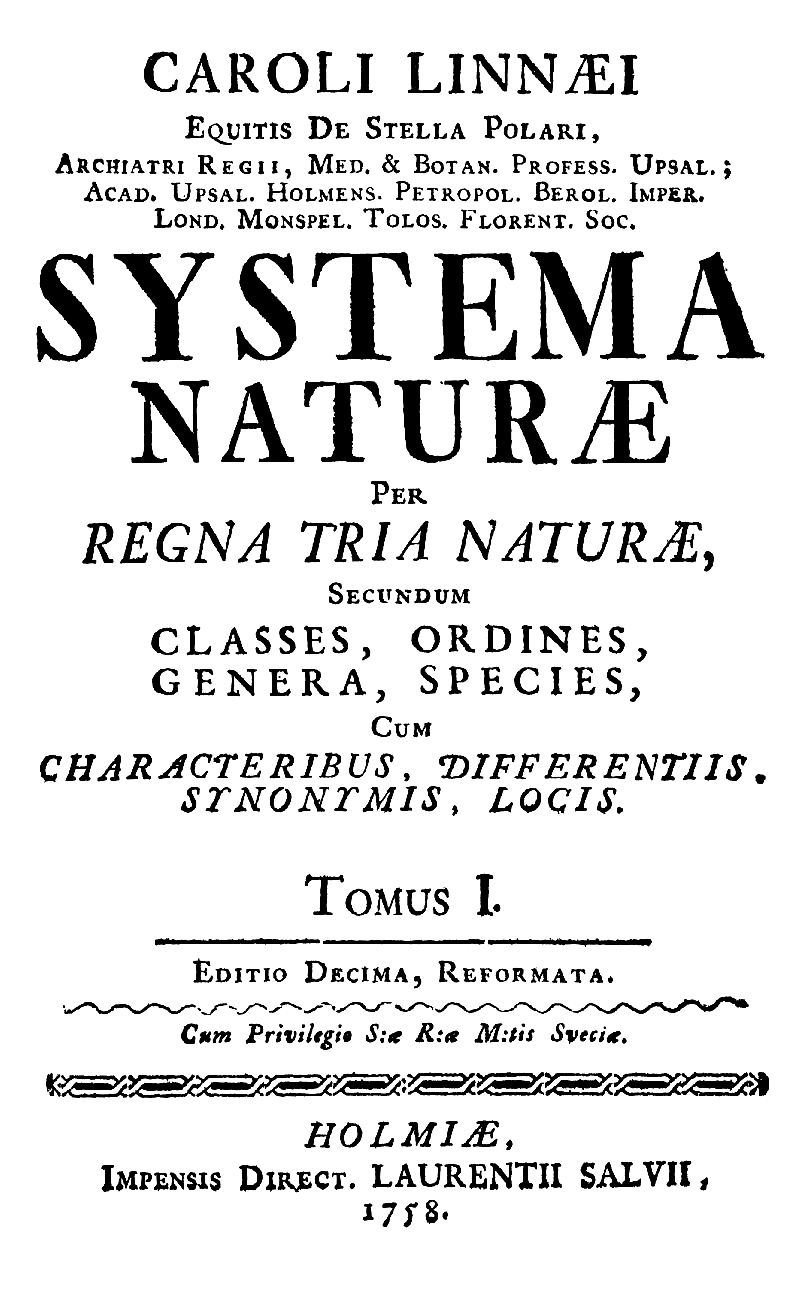
Lemurs were first formally classified in the 10th edition of Systema Naturae.

In the first volume of the 10th edition of Systema Naturae (1758), Carl Linnaeus, the founder of modern binomial nomenclature, created the genus Lemur to include three species: Lemur tardigradus (the red slender loris, now known as Loris tardigradus), Lemur catta (the ring-tailed lemur), and Lemur volans (the Philippine colugo, now known as Cynocephalus volans). Although the term "lemur" was at first intended for lorises, it was soon applied to the endemic Malagasy primates, which have been known as "lemurs" ever since. The name derives from the Latin term lemures, which refers to the "spirits of the dead" from Roman mythology. According to Linnaeus' own explanation, the name was selected because of the nocturnal activity and slow movements of the slender loris. Being familiar with the works of Virgil and Ovid and seeing an analogy that fit with his naming scheme, Linnaeus adapted the term "lemur" for these nocturnal primates. However, it has been commonly and falsely assumed that Linnaeus was referring to the ghost-like appearance, reflective eyes, and ghostly cries of lemurs. It has also been speculated that Linnaeus may also have known that some Malagasy people have held legends that lemurs are the souls of their ancestors, but this is unlikely given that the name was selected for slender lorises from India.

Since the first taxonomic classification of lemurs, many changes have been made to lemur taxonomy. Within the primate order, treeshrews (order Scandentia) were considered basal, prosimian primates—close relatives of lemurs—until the 1980s. Colugos, also incorrectly referred to as "flying lemurs", were once considered lemur-like primates, but were reclassified as close relatives of bats, and more recently as close relatives of primates within their own order, Dermoptera. Primates, together with their closest relatives, the treeshrews, colugos, and long-extinct plesiadapiforms, form the taxonomically unranked Euarchonta clade within the Euarchontoglires. Lorisids, some of which were originally placed in the genus Lemur by Carl Linnaeus, have since been moved into either their own infraorder (Lorisiformes) or their own superfamily (Lorisoidea) within Lemuriformes.

For the Malagasy primate fauna, taxonomic nomenclature proliferated during the 1800s, with the aid of museum systematists, such as Albert Günther and John Edward Gray, as well as naturalists and explorers, such as Alfred Grandidier. This nomenclature was not sorted out until decades later, when Ernst Schwarz standardized it in 1931. It was not until the 1990s that this nomenclature started to see a new wave of taxonomic change.

== Suprageneric classification ==
Although Carl Linnaeus originally grouped the first "lemurs" he classified under the order Primates, lemurs and other non-human primates were later separated from humans by being placed in the order Quadrumana by Johann Friedrich Blumenbach in 1775. (He also placed humans in the order Bimana.) This view was upheld by other famous naturalists and zoologists of the time, including Étienne Geoffroy Saint-Hilaire (who first placed lemurs in Strepsirrhini in 1812), Georges Cuvier, and (initially) John Edward Gray. By 1862, William Henry Flower, a comparative anatomist, was arguing against moving strepsirrhines out of Quadrumana into Insectivora (a now-abandoned biological grouping), claiming that their brain had features transitional between other primates and "inferior" mammals. In 1863, Thomas Henry Huxley restored the order Primates to include humans, other apes, monkeys, lemurs, and even colugos. However, opposition continued with many specialists arguing that lemurs (or "Half-apes") should be placed in their own order. In 1873, English comparative anatomist St. George Jackson Mivart countered these arguments and proceeded to define the primates by a list of anatomical features.

Closest lemur relations

- Euarchonta
  - Scandentia (treeshrews)
  - Dermoptera (colugos)
  - - †Plesiadapiformes
    - Primates
      - Haplorhini (tarsiers, monkeys, apes)
      - Strepsirrhini
        - †Adapiformes
        - Lemuriformes
          - Lorises, pottos,
            and galagos
          - Lemurs

Since the 19th century, the classification of lemurs above the genus level has seen many changes. Early taxonomists proposed a variety of classifications for lemurs, but generally separated indriids from other lemurs and placed the aye-aye in a major group of its own; some classified the dwarf and mouse lemurs with the galagos. In 1915, William King Gregory published a classification that remained generally accepted over the next decades. He placed all the lemurs together in a "series" Lemuriformes and recognized three families: Daubentoniidae, Indriidae, and Lemuridae (including the current Cheirogaleidae and Lepilemuridae). George Gaylord Simpson's influential 1945 classification of mammals placed the treeshrews and the fossil Anagale (both now classified outside Primates) inside Lemuriformes and classified the fossil families Plesiadapidae and Adapidae in a superfamily Lemuroidea with most of the lemurs.

Although treeshrews, plesiadapids, and the like are now no longer considered to be closely related to lemurs, disagreements persist over the classification of lemurs and related groups, resulting in competing arrangements of the infraorders and superfamilies within Strepsirrhini. In one taxonomy, infraorder Lemuriformes contains all living strepsirrhines in two superfamilies, Lemuroidea for all lemurs and Lorisoidea for the lorisoids (lorisids and galagos). Alternatively, the lorisoids are sometimes placed in their own infraorder, Lorisiformes, separate from the lemurs. Yet another classification published by Colin Groves placed the aye-aye in its own infraorder, Chiromyiformes, while the rest of the lemurs were placed in Lemuriformes and the lorisoids in Lorisiformes.

Competing taxonomic nomenclature for lemurs and their kin
2 infraorders	3 infraorders	4 infraorders
Order Primates; Suborder Strepsirrhini; Infraorder †Adapiformes; Infraorder Lemuriformes; Superfamily Lemuroidea; Family †Archaeolemuridae; Family Cheirogaleidae; Family Daubentoniidae; Family Indriidae; Family Lemuridae; Family Lepilemuridae; Family †Megaladapidae; Family †Palaeopropithecidae; Superfamily Lorisoidea; Suborder Haplorrhini	Order Primates; Suborder Strepsirrhini; Infraorder †Adapiformes; Infraorder Lemuriformes; Superfamily Lemuroidea; Family †Archaeolemuridae; Family Cheirogaleidae; Family Daubentoniidae; Family Indriidae; Family Lemuridae; Family Lepilemuridae; Family †Megaladapidae; Family †Palaeopropithecidae; Infraorder Lorisiformes; Suborder Haplorrhini	Order Primates; Suborder Strepsirrhini; Infraorder †Adapiformes; Infraorder Chiromyiformes; Family Daubentoniidae; Infraorder Lemuriformes; Superfamily Cheirogaleoidea; Family Cheirogaleidae; Superfamily Lemuroidea; Family †Archaeolemuridae; Family Indriidae; Family Lemuridae; Family Lepilemuridae; Family †Megaladapidae; Family †Palaeopropithecidae; Infraorder Lorisiformes; Suborder Haplorrhini

The classification of several lemur taxa has elicited particular debate. Most significantly, the placement of the aye-aye has been controversial since its introduction to Western science in 1782, and it has been a topic of debate until very recently. Arguing against Darwin's theory of natural selection, Richard Owen claimed in 1863 that the aye-aye's distinct characteristics, including its ever-growing incisors and unique, highly flexible middle finger, are so perfectly adapted for their uses in extractive foraging that they could not have evolved gradually through natural selection. More recently, the aye-aye's placement has posed problems for the rafting hypothesis for the primate colonization of Madagascar. If this species does not form a monophyletic group with the rest of the lemurs, then multiple colonization events would have had to occur to explain the occurrence of lemurs on Madagascar.

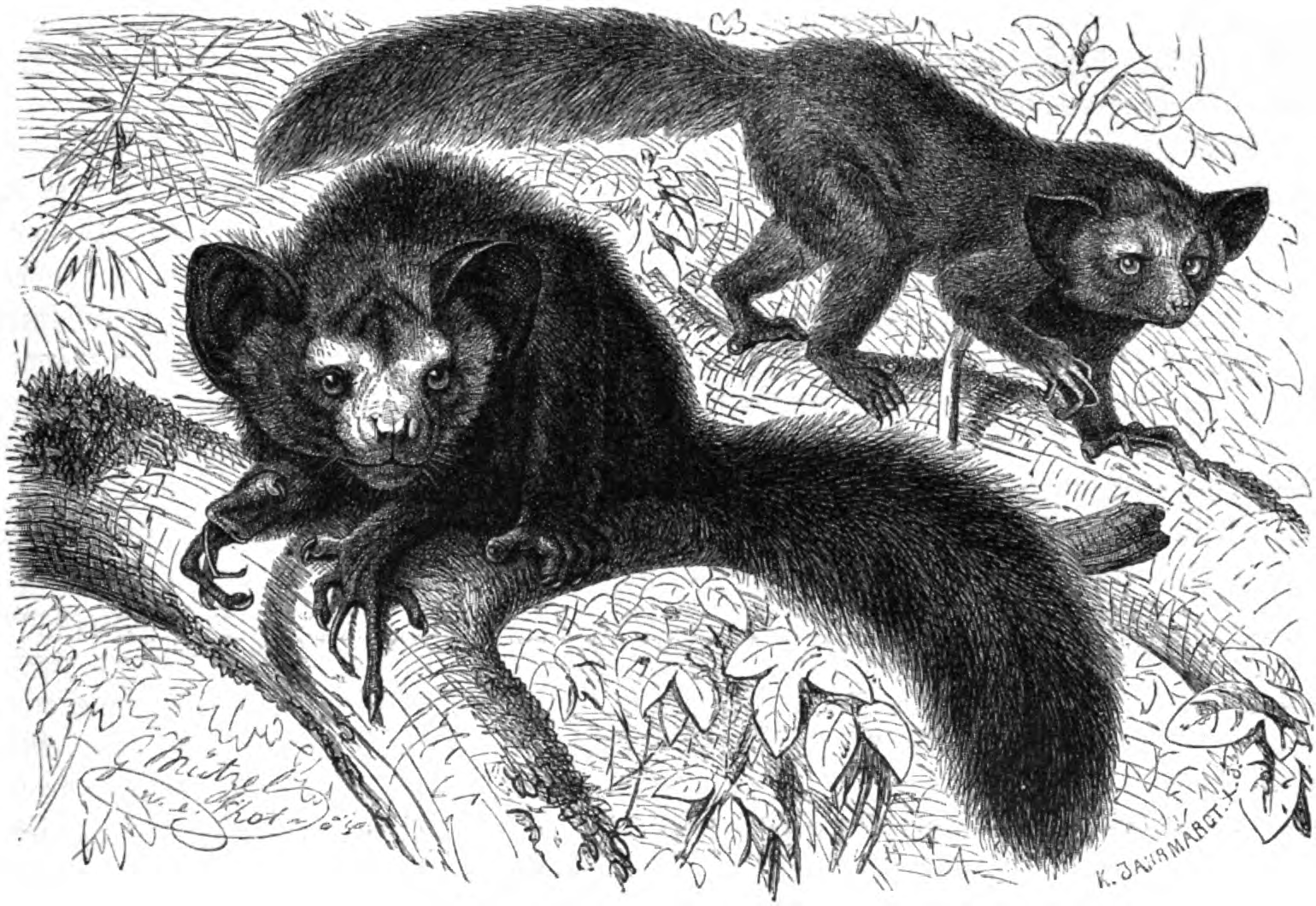
The aye-aye has traditionally been difficult to classify due to its unique physical traits.

Until Owen published a definitive anatomical study in 1866, early naturalists were uncertain whether the aye-aye (genus Daubentonia) was a primate, rodent, or marsupial. In the late 18th century, for example, the aye-aye was classified under the squirrel genus Sciurus. By emphasizing its primate features, such as its postorbital bar, stereoscopic vision, and opposable hallux, over its rodent-like teeth, Owen demonstrated its affinity with other primates. In 1996, Ankel-Simons demonstrated that the shape and arrangement of the aye-aye's diminutive deciduous incisors indicate that this genus has a shared ancestry with the toothcombed primates. However, the placement of the aye-aye within the primates remained problematic until very recently. The karyotype of the aye-aye is noticeably different from that of its closest relatives, the lorises and the rest of the lemurs, with a diploid chromosome count of 2n=30. Based on its anatomy, researchers have found support for classifying the genus Daubentonia as a specialized indriid, a sister group to all strepsirrhines, and an indeterminate taxon within the primates. In 1931, Schwarz labeled the aye-aye as an offshoot of Indriidae, claiming that all lemurs were monophyletic, whereas Reginald Innes Pocock had previously placed the aye-aye outside of the lemurs. In that same year, Anthony and Coupin classified the aye-aye under infraorder Chiromyiformes, a sister group to the other strepsirrhines. Colin Groves upheld this classification in 2005 because he was not entirely convinced the aye-aye formed a clade with the rest of the Malagasy lemurs, despite molecular tests that had shown Daubentoniidae was basal to all Lemuroidea.

Competing lemur phylogenies

- Lemur clade
  - Daubentoniidae
  - - - Indriidae
      - - Lepilemuridae
        - Cheirogaleidae
    - Lemuridae

- Lemur clade
  - Daubentoniidae
  - - Lepilemuridae
    - - Cheirogaleidae
      - - - Lemuridae
          - †Megaladapidae
        - - Indriidae
          - †Palaeopropithecidae
          - †Archaeolemuridae

There are two competing lemur phylogenies, one by Horvath et al. (top) and one by Orlando et al. (bottom). Note that Horvath et al. did not attempt to place the subfossil lemurs.

Another interpretation of the aye-aye's origins has once again called into question the single origins of the lemurs. The aye-aye and a fossil strepsirrhine primate from Africa, Plesiopithecus, share similarities in the shape of the skull and the morphology of the lower jaw, which suggest that the latter could be an early relative of the aye-aye. However, the placement of an aye-aye ancestor in Africa would require multiple colonizations of Madagascar by strepsirrhine primates. Molecular tests may offer support, since they show that the aye-aye was the first to diverge in the lemur clade and that the other lemur families did not diverge until much later.

Often classified with the galagos by early students, the cheirogaleids (dwarf and mouse lemurs) were placed with the other lemurs from Gregory's 1915 classification until the early 1970s, when several anthropologists proposed that they were more closely related to lorisoids, based on morphological data. However, relevant genetic studies unanimously place cheirogaleids within the lemuroid clade and Groves himself, who had promoted the cheirogaleid-lorisoid relationship in a 1974 paper, by 2001 regarded the idea as refuted.

Classifications in the first half of the 20th century divided lemurs into three families: Daubentoniidae, Indriidae, and Lemuridae, with the latter including the current Cheirogaleidae and Lepilemuridae. Because of concerns that Lemuridae might not be monophyletic, the family was later split; in 1982 Tattersall separated the Cheirogaleidae for the dwarf lemurs, mouse lemurs and relatives, and the Lepilemuridae for the sportive lemurs and bamboo lemurs (including the greater bamboo lemur). This classification is still used, except that the bamboo lemurs were moved back to Lemuridae.

From the 1970s to the 1990s, there have been suggestions that the ruffed lemurs might be related to indriids or a sister group to Lemuridae and Indriidae and that the bamboo lemurs are related to the sportive lemurs, but neither view is supported by molecular phylogeny. The sportive lemurs and the extinct koala lemurs (Megaladapidae) both lack upper incisors in the permanent dentition, and in 1981, Groves placed both together in the family Megaladapidae, which he renamed Lepilemuridae in 2005 because that older name takes precedence. Genetic research does not support a close relationship between the sportive and koala lemurs and instead places the koala lemurs as a sister group to Lemuridae; therefore, the two are now placed in separate families (Lepilemuridae for the sportive lemurs and Megaladapidae for the koala lemurs). The sloth lemurs (Palaeopropithecidae) and monkey lemurs (Archaeolemuridae) were classified as subfamilies within Indriidae as late as 1982, but are now recognized as separate families.

The relationships among the families of lemurs have been problematic and have yet to be definitively resolved. Two competing phylogenies exist based on genetic and molecular data. One approach (Horvath et al.) looks at a larger number of genes, but among fewer species. This results in Lemuridae being a sister group to Lepilemuridae, Cheirogaleidae, and Indriidae. The other approach (Orlando et al.) looks at fewer genes, but more lemur species. Using this analysis, Lepilemuridae becomes the sister group to Lemuridae, Cheirogaleidae, and Indriidae. Both phylogenies agree that the Malagasy primates are monophyletic and that Daubentoniidae (the aye-aye) is basal to the lemuroid clade, having split off significantly earlier than the other families. However, two problems create complications for both approaches. First, the four most closely related living lemur families diverged within a narrow window of approximately 10 million years, making it much harder to distinguish the splits with molecular evidence. In addition, these families diverged from their last common ancestor approximately 42 mya; such distant splits create a lot of noise for molecular techniques.

== Genus-level classification ==
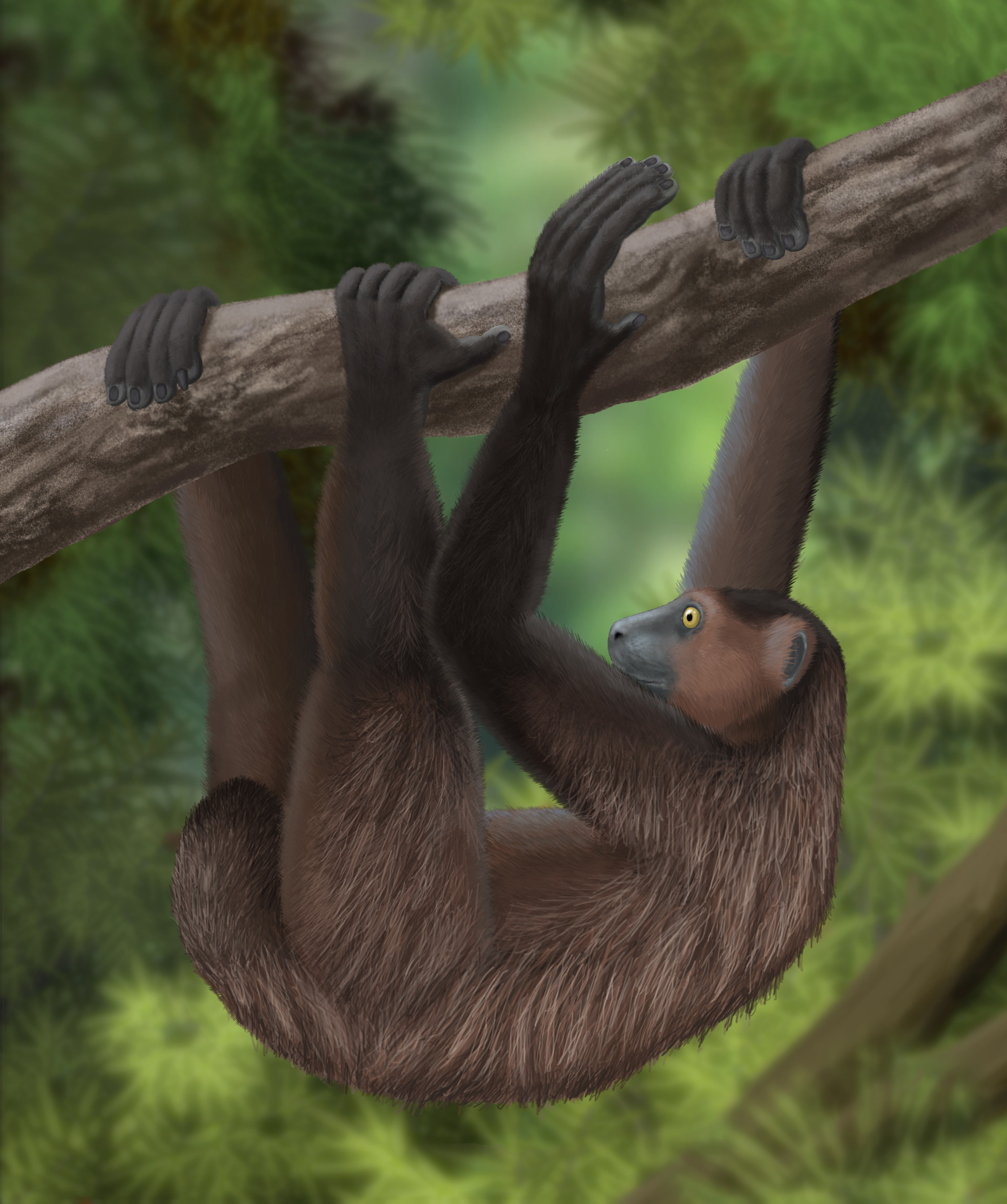
The naming of the extinct Babakotia radofilai in 1990 added another genus to the list of subfossil lemurs.

Early distribution of lemur species among genera differed in a number of ways from current taxonomy. For example, the fork-marked lemurs were initially placed in Lemur and then in Microcebus with the mouse lemurs before being placed in their own genus Phaner, and Charles Immanuel Forsyth Major split the Cheirogaleus medius species group of the dwarf lemurs into a separate genus Opolemur, but this was not accepted. Genus-level taxonomy was largely stabilized by Schwarz in 1931, but a number of later changes have become accepted:

- The ring-tailed lemur, ruffed lemurs, and brown lemurs were once grouped together in the genus Lemur due to a host of morphological similarities. For instance, the skeletons of the ring-tailed lemur and the brown lemurs are nearly indistinguishable. However, ruffed lemurs were reassigned to the genus Varecia in 1962, and due to similarities between the ring-tailed lemur and the bamboo lemurs, particularly in regards to molecular evidence and scent gland similarities, the brown lemurs were moved to the genus Eulemur in 1988. The genus Lemur is now monotypic, containing only the ring-tailed lemur.
- In 2001, Colin Groves concluded that despite similarities, the greater bamboo lemur was sufficiently distinct from the bamboo lemurs of the genus Hapalemur to merit its own monotypic genus, Prolemur, in contrast to Schwarz's 1931 disagreement with Pocock's decision to separate Prolemur from Hapalemur.
- Originally placed in the genus Microcebus (mouse lemurs), the giant mouse lemur was moved to its own genus, Mirza, in 1985 due to its larger size, morphological differences, dental characteristics, and behavior.
- The hairy-eared dwarf lemur was first placed in the genus Cheirogaleus (dwarf lemurs) in 1875 and was later found to have closer affinities with Microcebus. However, its dentition and cranium structure were held sufficiently distinct to merit elevation to its own genus, Allocebus.
- In 1948, paleontologist Charles Lamberton proposed a new sub-genus for the giant ruffed lemurs, Pachylemur, which had previously been placed in the genus Lemur. Since the 1960s, it has been considered its own separate genus, although the two extinct species of giant ruffed lemur have sometimes been grouped under Varecia with their closest relatives.
- A new genus of sloth lemur, Babakotia was named in 1990.

== Species-level classification ==
There is widespread disagreement on aspects of species-level lemur taxonomy, particularly concerning the recent increase in the number of recognized species. According to Russell Mittermeier, the former president of Conservation International (CI), and others, there are currently 112 recognized species or subspecies of extant lemur, divided into five families and 15 genera. Conversely, other experts in the field label this as a possible example of taxonomic inflation, and prefer instead an estimate of at least 50 species. All sides generally agree that the recently extinct subfossil lemurs should be classified in three families, eight genera, and 17 species.

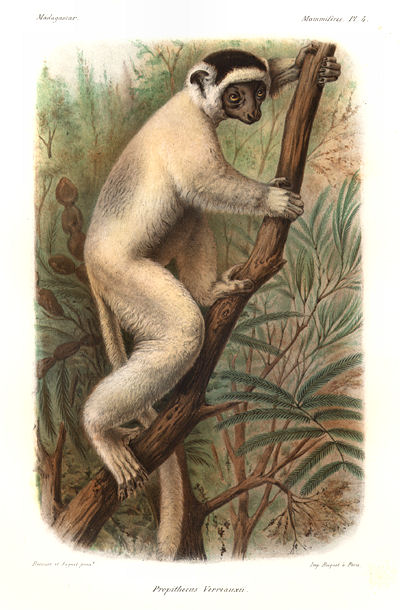
Many subspecies have been promoted to species status, yielding nine species for the genus Propithecus.

Over the past two decades, the number of recognized lemur species has more than tripled according to some experts. In 1994, 32 distinct species were named in the first edition of Conservation International's field guide, Lemurs of Madagascar, and 68 were described in the 2nd edition, published in 2006. In December 2008, Russell Mittermeier, Colin Groves, and other experts co-wrote an article in the International Journal of Primatology classifying 99 species and subspecies. In late 2010, the 3rd edition of Lemurs of Madagascar listed 101 taxa. More taxa were listed in subsequent editions; in 2023, the 5th edition listed 112 taxa.

This over threefold increase in the two decades following the first edition did not have universal support among taxonomists and lemur researchers. In many cases, classifications ultimately depends upon which species concept is used. Due to the critical condition that most Malagasy primate populations are in, taxonomists and conservationists sometimes favor splitting them into separate species to develop an effective strategy for the conservation of the full range of lemur diversity. Implicitly, this means that full species status will help grant genetically distinct populations added environmental protection.

The first large wave of new lemur species descriptions came in 2000, when Colin Groves split two species of dwarf lemur (Cheirogaleus) into seven species while Rodin Rasoloarison and colleagues recognized seven species of mouse lemur in western Madagascar. Then in 2001, Groves elevated the red ruffed lemur (Varecia rubra), five subspecies of brown lemur (Eulemur albifrons, E. albocollaris, E. collaris, E. rufus and E. sanfordi), and four subspecies of sifaka (Propithecus coquereli, P. deckenii, P. edwardsi, and P. perrieri) to full species status. Additional elevations of all remaining subspecies within the Eulemur and Propithecus genera were made in the years that followed. These and subsequent changes in taxonomy were largely due to a shift to the phylogenetic species concept, and are not universally endorsed.

By far the most explosive growth in species numbers (in absolute terms) has been in the genera Microcebus and Lepilemur. In 2006, 15 new species of Lepilemur were described, with three new species reported in February, one in June, and 11 in September. Since then, three additional species have been described, one of which turned out to be identical to a previously described species. Genetic and morphological differences seem to suggest that they are cryptic species, but there is still debate whether these merit full species status or should be regarded as subspecies of previously identified, "core" species.

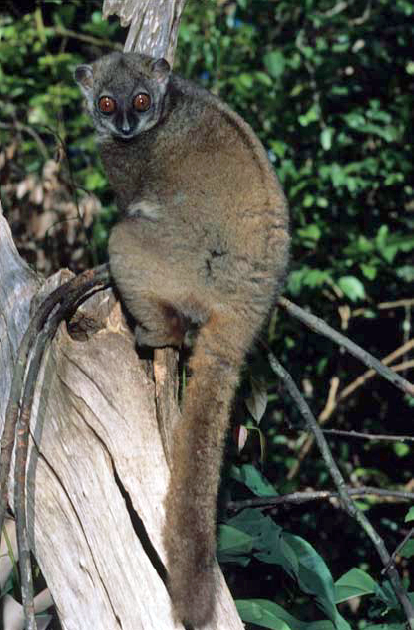
The Sahamalaza sportive lemur (Lepilemur sahamalazensis) was one of many new sportive lemur species identified in the 2000s.

Both brown lemurs and mouse lemurs were initially divided into a small number of species, either with no distinguishable subspecies (in the case of mouse lemurs) or with several distinguishable subspecies (in the case of brown lemurs). With molecular research suggesting a more distant split in both genera, these subspecies or undistinguished populations have been promoted to species status.

In the case of mouse lemurs, the rise in species numbers has been only slightly less sudden and dramatic. Classified as one species by Ernst Schwarz in 1931 (excluding one, Coquerel's giant mouse lemur, that is no longer classified in Microcebus), the genus was revised to contain two species, the gray mouse lemur (Microcebus murinus) and the brown mouse lemur (M. rufus), after an extensive field study in 1972 showed both living in sympatry in southeastern Madagascar. At the time, the gray mouse lemur was known in the drier parts of the north, west, and south, while the brown mouse lemur inhabited the humid rainforest regions of the east. However, the species diversity and distribution are now known to be significantly more complex. Revisions throughout the 1990s and 2000s identified numerous new species through genetic testing using mitochondrial DNA, demonstrating that the genus is represented by a multitude of cryptic species. Many, but not all of these defined species have been supported by nuclear DNA tests.

However, there are still concerns that species are being identified prematurely. Ian Tattersall, an anthropologist who recognized 42 species of lemur in 1982, has expressed concern that the geographically organized variety in lemur populations is being recognized with full species status while the number of subspecies in lemur genera has virtually disappeared. He has argued that taxonomists are confusing differentiation and speciation, two processes that are often unrelated, while denying the role of microevolution in evolutionary processes. Still other researchers who emphasize the framework of the "general lineage concept of species" contend that lineage divergence or differentiation demarcates the beginning of a new species.

New species have been identified due to differences in morphology, karyotypes, cytochrome b sequences, and other genetic tests, as well as several combinations of these. When nuclear DNA (nDNA) was tested in conjunction with mitochondrial DNA (mtDNA) in mouse lemurs, a few species, such as Claire's mouse lemur (Microcebus mamiratra) were demonstrated to be indistinguishable from other closely related species. In such cases, nDNA did not vary, but the mtDNA that had been used to define it as a species was still distinct. Differences in results between nDNA, which is inherited from both parents, and mtDNA, which is inherited from the mother, was attributed to female philopatry, where females remain within or close to the home range into which they were born while males disperse. Since the isolated population known as Claire's mouse lemur has distinct mtDNA, but not nDNA, it is likely to contain a population descended from a related group of females, but which still disperses and interbreeds with nearby populations.

Traditionally, karyology has been considered when determining species status. For example, in 2006, three new species of sportive lemur were named based partly on karyotypes. From the lemurs studied so far, the diploid number of chromosomes varies between 2n=20 and 2n=66. In the case of the brown lemurs, the diploid number ranges from 2n=44 to 2n=60 while the individual chromosome sizes vary considerably, despite strong similarities in morphology.

Sometimes distinctions are made due to very slight differences in pelage coloration. For instance, three distinctly colored types of mouse lemur were discovered in a multi-year study in Beza Mahafaly Reserve in southern Madagascar, but rather than being separate species, DNA tests revealed that they all belonged to a single species, the reddish-gray mouse lemur (Microcebus griseorufus). For this reason, further research is needed to confirm or deny the recent species splits. Only through detailed studies of morphology, ecology, behavior, and genetics can the true number of lemur species be determined.

Lemur species and subspecies count by year and genus
	1931 Schwarz		1982 Tattersall		1994 Mittermeier et al.		2005 Groves		2006 Mittermeier et al.		2010 Mittermeier et al.		2023 Mittermeier et al.	
genus	species	subspecies	species	subspecies	species	subspecies	species	subspecies	species	subspecies	species	subspecies	species	subspecies
Allocebus (Note: In 1931, Allocebus was not recognized as a separate genus, but was lumped under the genus Cheirogaleus.)	–	–	1	0	1	0	1	0	1	0	1	0	1	0
Avahi	1	2	1	2	2	0	3	0	4	0	9	0	9	0
Cheirogaleus	3	4	2	0	2	0	7	0	7	0	5	0	9	0
Daubentonia	1	0	1	0	1	0	1	0	1	0	1	0	1	0
Eulemur (Note: In 1931 and 1982, Eulemur was not recognized as a separate genus, but was lumped under the genus Lemur.)	–	–	–	–	5	8	11	2	10	2	12	0	12	0
Hapalemur (Note: The genus Prolemur was not distinguished until 2001. Prior to this, the greater bamboo lemur was placed in the genus Hapalemur.)	2	2	2	3	3	3	4	2	5	0	5	3	5	3
Indri	1	0	1	0	1	0	1	2	1	0	1	0	1	0
Lemur (Note: In 1931, Varecia was not recognized as a separate genus, but was lumped under the genus Lemur.)	6	7	4	7	1	0	1	0	1	0	1	0	1	0
Lepilemur	2	0	1	6	7	0	8	0	8	0	26	0	26	0
Microcebus (Note: In 1931, Mirza was not recognized as a separate genus, but was lumped under the genus Microcebus.)	2	2	2	0	3	0	8	0	12	0	18	0	25	0
Mirza	–	–	1	0	1	0	1	0	2	0	2	0	2	0
Phaner	1	0	1	0	1	4	4	0	4	0	4	0	4	0
Prolemur	–	–	–	–	–	–	1	0	1	0	1	0	1	0
Propithecus	2	9	2	9	3	8	7	4	9	0	9	0	9	0
Varecia	–	–	1	2	1	2	1	4	2	3	2	3	2	3
Totals (Note: The grand total of species and subspecies for each year will not equal the sum of the species total and the subspecies total since each subspecies group already counts as one species. For example, in 2010 three subspecies of Varecia variegata were recognized: V. v. variegata, V. v. editorum, and V. v. subcincta. Together, they count as one species, which is already included in the species total for that year. The same applies that year for Hapalemur. For this reason there were 101 species and subspecies (97 − 2 + 6 = 101) in 2010, not 103.)	21	26	20	29	32	25	59	14	68	5	97	6	108	6
Totals	38		42		50		67		71		101		112	
