= Vesperus conicicollis =

Scientific classification
- Domain: Eukaryota
- Kingdom: Animalia
- Phylum: Arthropoda
- Class: Insecta
- Order: Coleoptera
- Suborder: Polyphaga
- Infraorder: Cucujiformia
- Family: Vesperidae
- Genus: Vesperus
- Species: V. conicicollis

Binomial name
- Vesperus conicicollis Fairmaire & Coquerel, 1866

Species of beetle

Vesperus conicicollis is a species of brown coloured beetle in the family Vesperidae, found in Portugal, Spain, and on the island of Sardinia.
