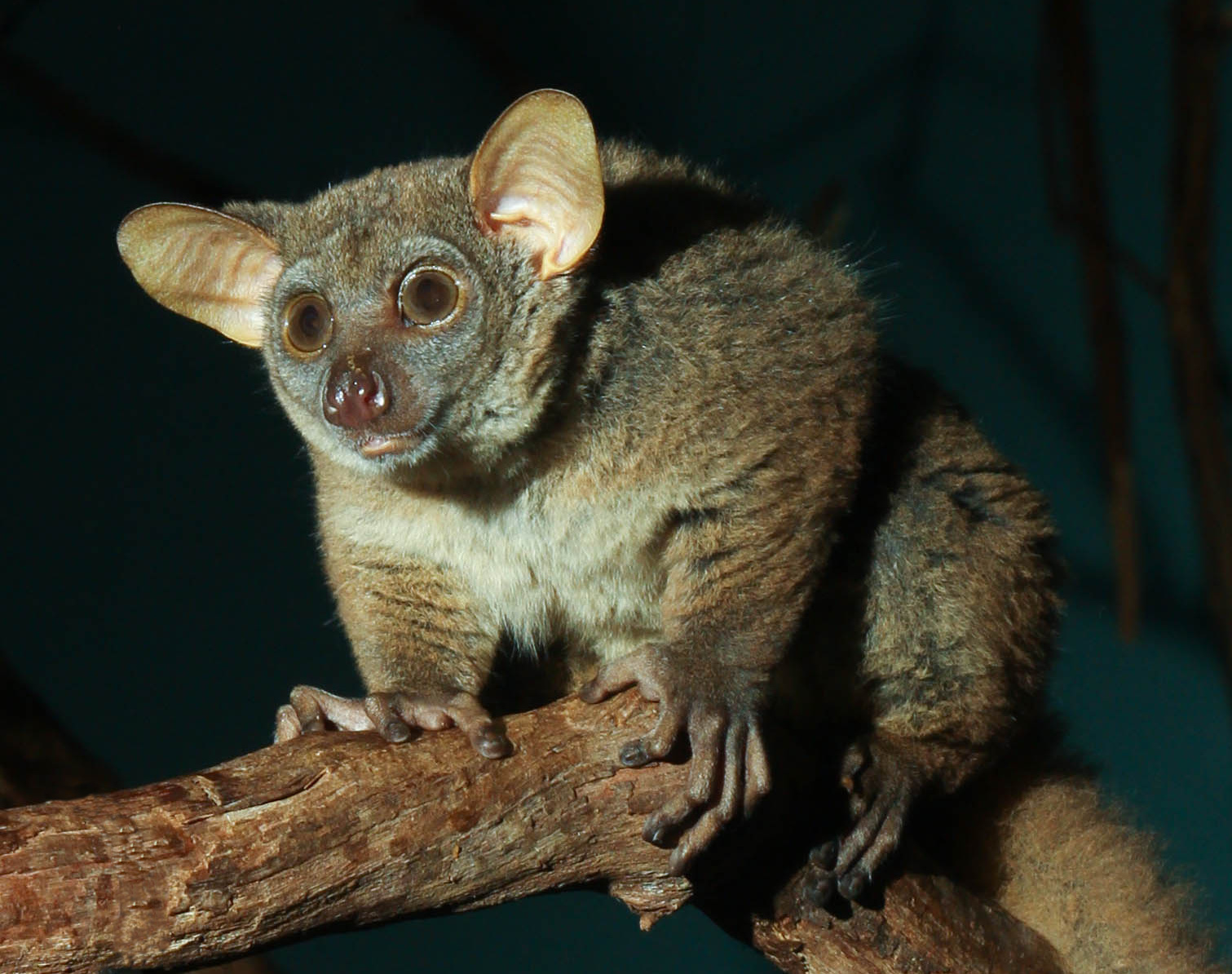

Conservation status
- Least Concern (IUCN 3.1)

Scientific classification
- Kingdom: Animalia
- Phylum: Chordata
- Class: Mammalia
- Infraclass: Placentalia
- Order: Primates
- Suborder: Strepsirrhini
- Family: Galagidae
- Genus: Otolemur
- Species: O. garnettii

Binomial name
- Otolemur garnettii (Ogilby, 1838)
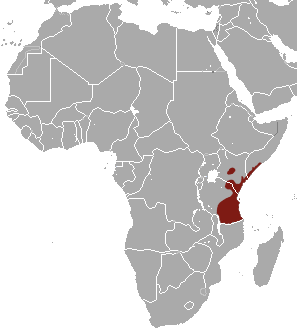
- Northern greater galago range

= Northern greater galago =

Species of primate

The northern greater galago (Otolemur garnettii), also known as Garnett's greater galago, Garnett's galago, or the small-eared greater galago, is a nocturnal, arboreal primate endemic to Africa.

== Subspecies ==
Four subspecies of Otolemur garnettii are recognized:

- Otolemur garnettii garnettii
- Otolemur garnettii lasiotis
- Otolemur garnettii kikuyuensis
- Otolemur garnettii panganiensis

== Physical characteristics ==
This species has a large body size relative to other galagos. The ears are small relative to the round head with short, wide snout. The eyes are large and binocular. The dentition formula is 2:1:3:3.

The coloration depends upon subspecies: O. g. garnetti exhibits green-tinged reddish brown dorsal pelage. The ventral side is yellow and the terminal half of the tail is black. O. g. lasiotis has lighter and more gray toned fur than O. g. garnetti. The ventral side is white and the tail's terminal end of the tail is only slightly darker than the rest with a white tip. O. g. kikuyuensis exhibits iron gray fur tinged with green on its back, flanks and limbs. The ventral side is yellow-white. The tail is usually light brown with the terminal quarter being black. O. g. panganiensis is reddish brown to gray lacking the greenish hints in other species, while the ventral surface varies from white to yellow. The terminal quarter of the tail is dark brown or black.

The northern greater galago has a head-and-body length of 23–34 cm (26 cm average), a tail length of 31–44 cm (average 36 cm) and body weight of 0.5–1 kg (mean 0.75 kg). This species exhibits significant degree of sexual size dimorphism with males larger than the females. This is due to bimaturism, where males have a longer period of growth and have an average 19% greater body mass than females. The average male is 794 g and the average adult female is 734 g.

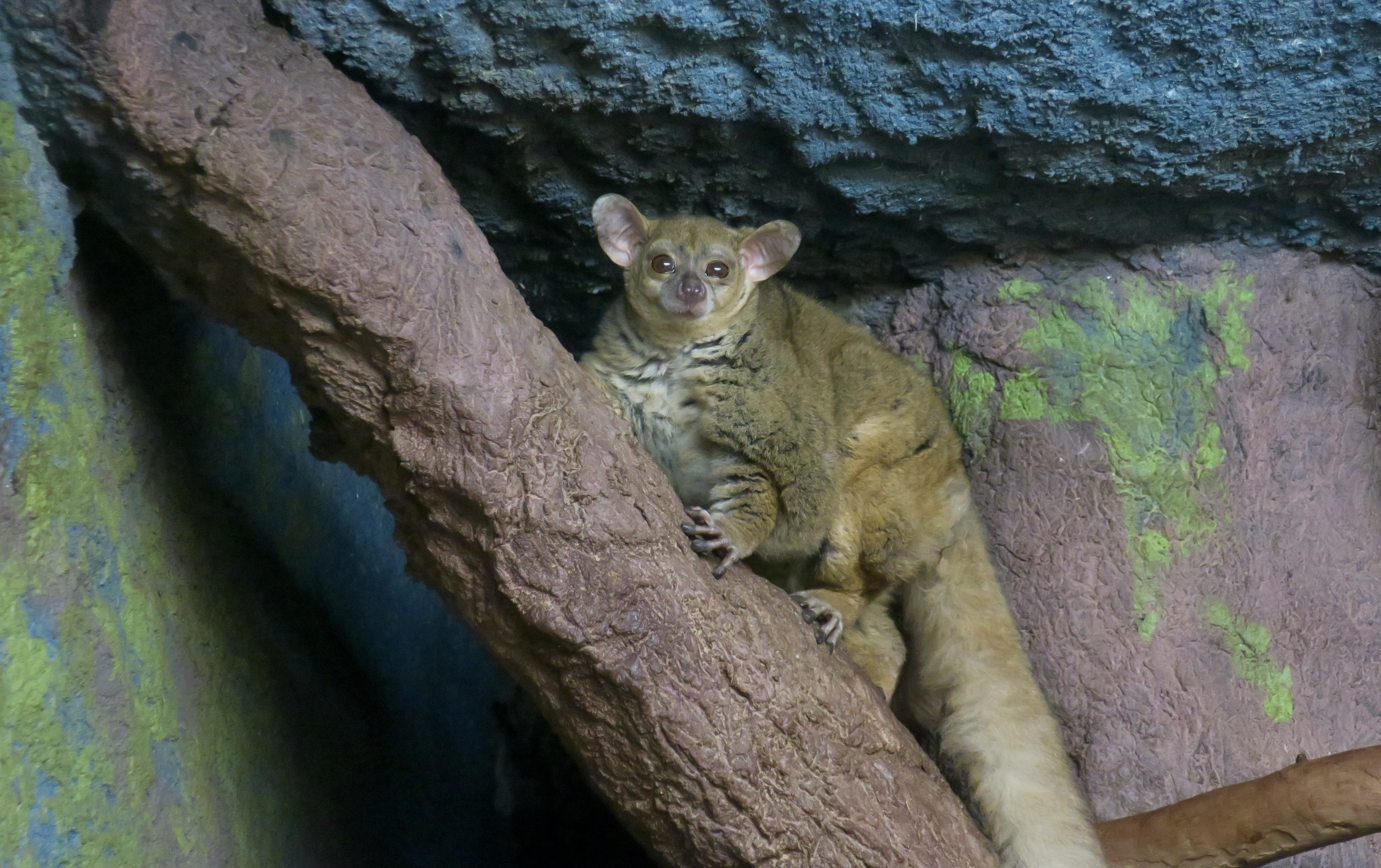
At Wildlife World Zoo.

== Distribution and habitat ==
The species is found in coastal regions of East Africa ranging from the Juba River in Somalia to the Ruvuma River in Tanzania. It also can be found inland throughout the Kenyan highlands and on the islands of Zanzibar and Pemba. The species is restricted to coastal and riverine forests or Kenyan highland forest. It does not inhabit woodland savannah. The actual geographic range of each subspecies is as follows: O. g. garnetti is restricted to Zanzibar and the Pemba Islands. O. g. lasiotis is found along the Kenyan coast as far north as the Juba River and south to Tanga Region, Tanzania. Its range extends inland to the Taita Hills and Kibwezi. O. g. kikuyuensis is found in the Kenyan Highlands. O. g. panganiensis is found throughout Tanzania from the border of Mozambique north to Tanga.

== Behavior and diet ==
The northern greater galago is a nocturnal predominantly arboreal primate. During the day, they sleep alone in trees and emerge at night. They tend to focus on a particular portion of their home range for several nights while foraging, then move on to concentrate on a new section after a short time. They are quadrupedal and are capable of hopping short distances from tree to tree. Unlike their larger relatives the brown greater galagos, northern greater galagos can land hind feet first when leaping. Their diet consists primarily of fruit and insects, approximately a 50/50 mix. They are capable of learned behaviors to fish and consume mollusks when available.

== Territory and social behavior ==
Greater northern galagos are solitary and live and forage in their home range marked by urine and scent gland on chest. Males and females disperse from their birth territory, with males doing so earlier and moving farther away. Males and females do not have ranges that overlap with same sex and same-aged individuals. Males have territories that overlap with several females. However, females tend to be dominant over males. Males tend to follow females around and females show more aggression to transient individuals passing through their home territory than do males. These species are less social compared to Otolemur crassicaudatus likely due to the fact they are frugivorous. It is more profitable to exclude non related individuals from areas where fruit is available. They still exhibit some social play. Social grooming is not present instead reciprocal licking performs function of grooming while minimizing social interaction.

== Reproduction morphology and behavior ==
Male galago species possess very distinctive penile morphology that can be used to classify species. The northern greater galago penis is on average 18 mm in length and width of shaft is even from body to bottom of tip. The baculum is clearly visible at the tip. The glans terminates with a characteristic set of curves which does not occur in any other species. The surface is spined with doubled headed or even tridentate penile spines pointing towards the body. They are less densely packed than in Otolemur crassicaudatus.

Northern greater galagos are promiscuous in their sexual behavior. The female comes into estrus once a year in the spring. The male is drawn to a female in heat and emits a sex call. If the female is receptive, she will allow copulation with the male licking her head following intercourse. This process may be repeated. The gestation period for this species is 130 days with females usually only having one offspring at any time. Twins are rare. Mothers carry their infants with their mouths to nests and leave them while they forage, returning to nurse their young. Infants are weaned by the 5th week and reach sexual maturity by 20 months of age.

== Miscellaneous ==
A low-coverage genomic sequence of the northern greater galago, was completed in 2006. As a 'primitive' primate, the sequence is particularly useful in bridging the sequences of higher primates (macaque, chimp, human) to close non-primates such as rodents. The current 2x coverage is not sufficient to create a full genome assembly, but will provide comparative data across most of the human assembly.
