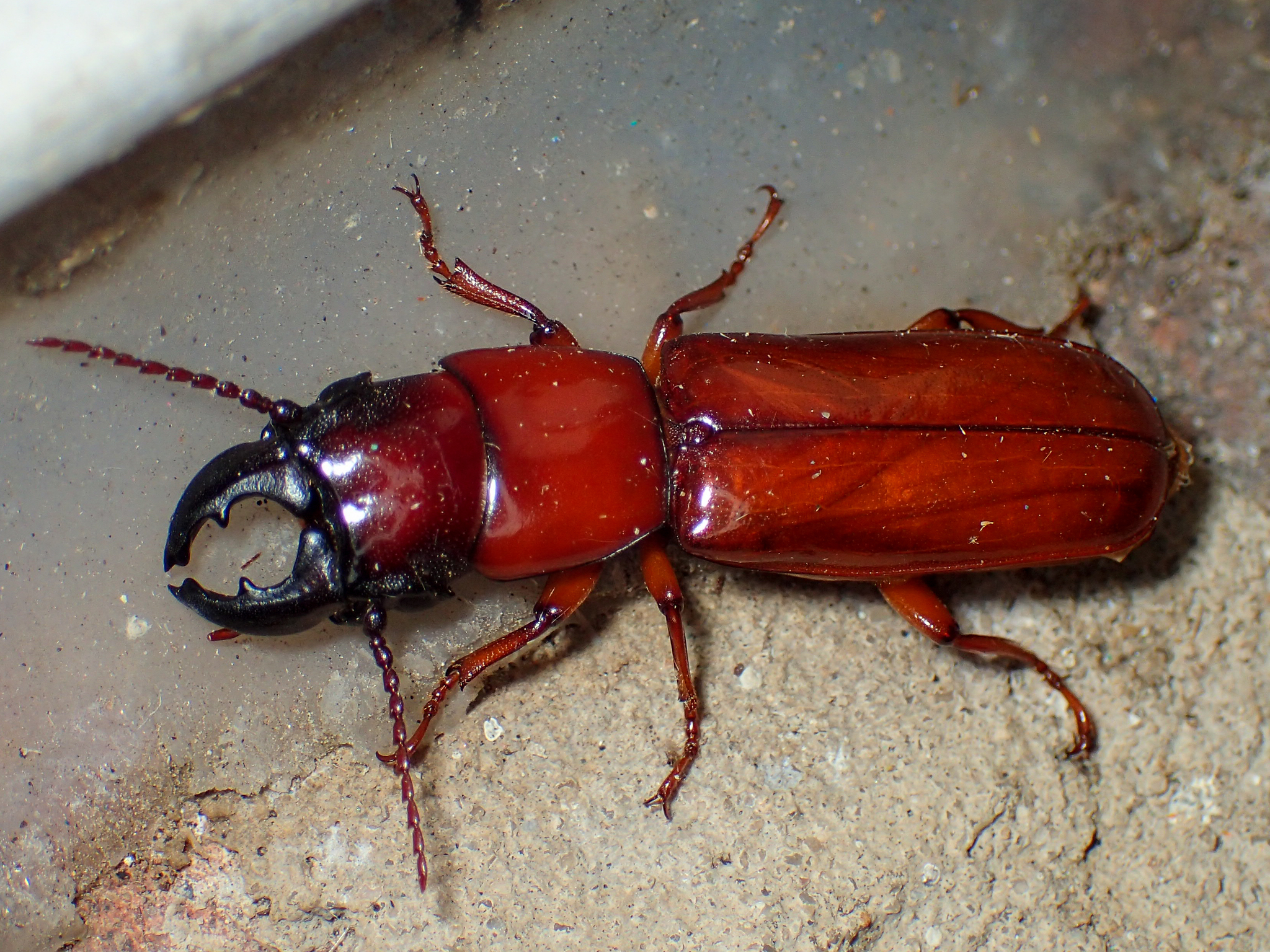
- Parandra polita, Alabama

Scientific classification
- Kingdom: Animalia
- Phylum: Arthropoda
- Class: Insecta
- Order: Coleoptera
- Suborder: Polyphaga
- Infraorder: Cucujiformia
- Superfamily: Chrysomeloidea
- Family: Cerambycidae
- Subfamily: Parandrinae
- Genus: Parandra
- Species: P. polita

Binomial name
- Parandra polita Say, 1835

Synonyms
- Hesperandra cylindrica (Thomson, 1861); Hesperandra polita Chemsak, 1996; Parandra cylindrica Thomson, 1867; Parandra polita Doane et al., 1936

= Parandra polita =

Species of beetle

Parandra polita is a species in the longhorn beetle family Cerambycidae. It is found in North, Central, and South America.
