= Vesperus nigellus =

Scientific classification
- Domain: Eukaryota
- Kingdom: Animalia
- Phylum: Arthropoda
- Class: Insecta
- Order: Coleoptera
- Suborder: Polyphaga
- Infraorder: Cucujiformia
- Family: Vesperidae
- Genus: Vesperus
- Species: V. nigellus

Binomial name
- Vesperus nigellus Compte Sarte, 1963

Species of beetle

Vesperus nigellus is a species of beetle in the Vesperidae family that is endemic to Balearic Islands.
