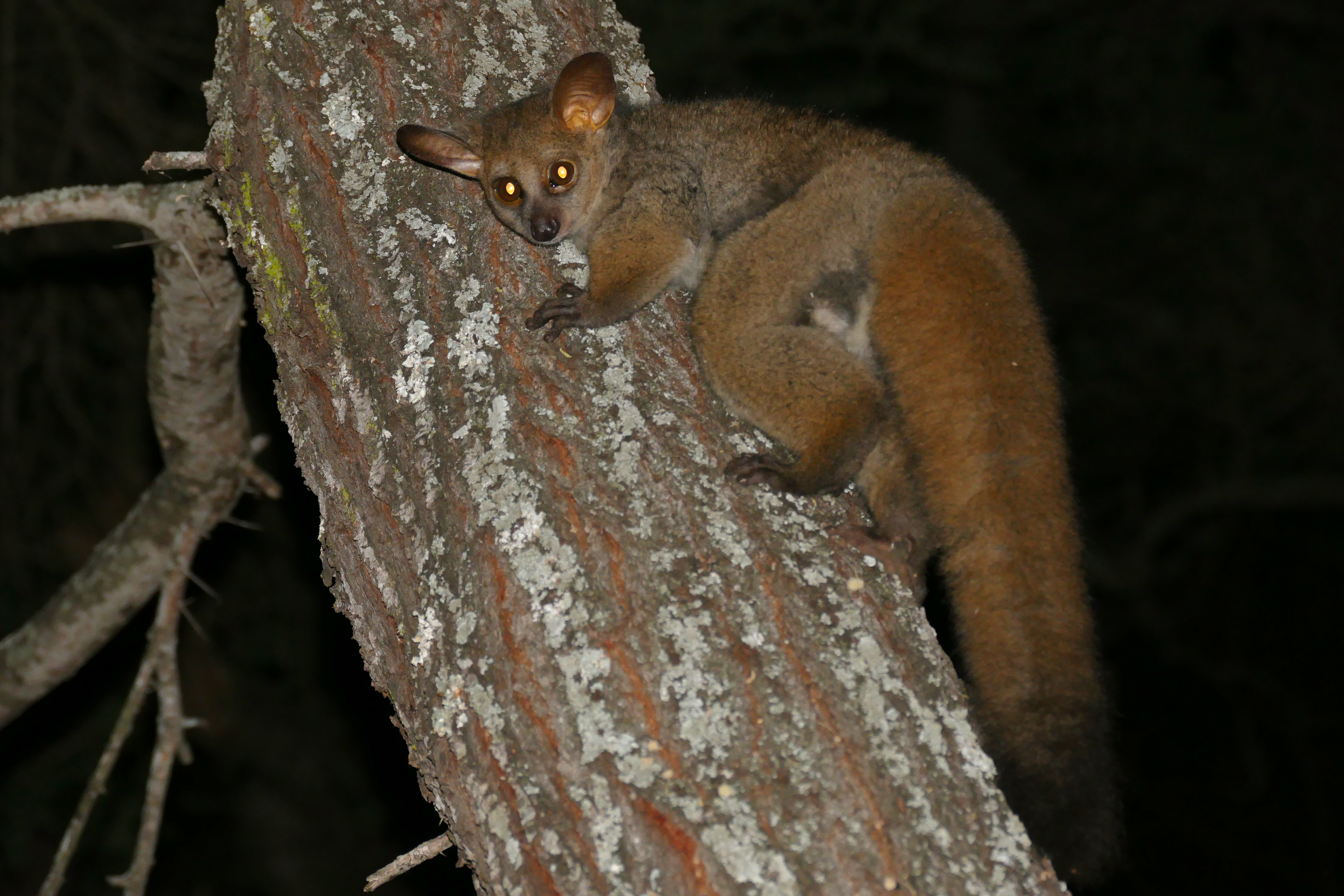

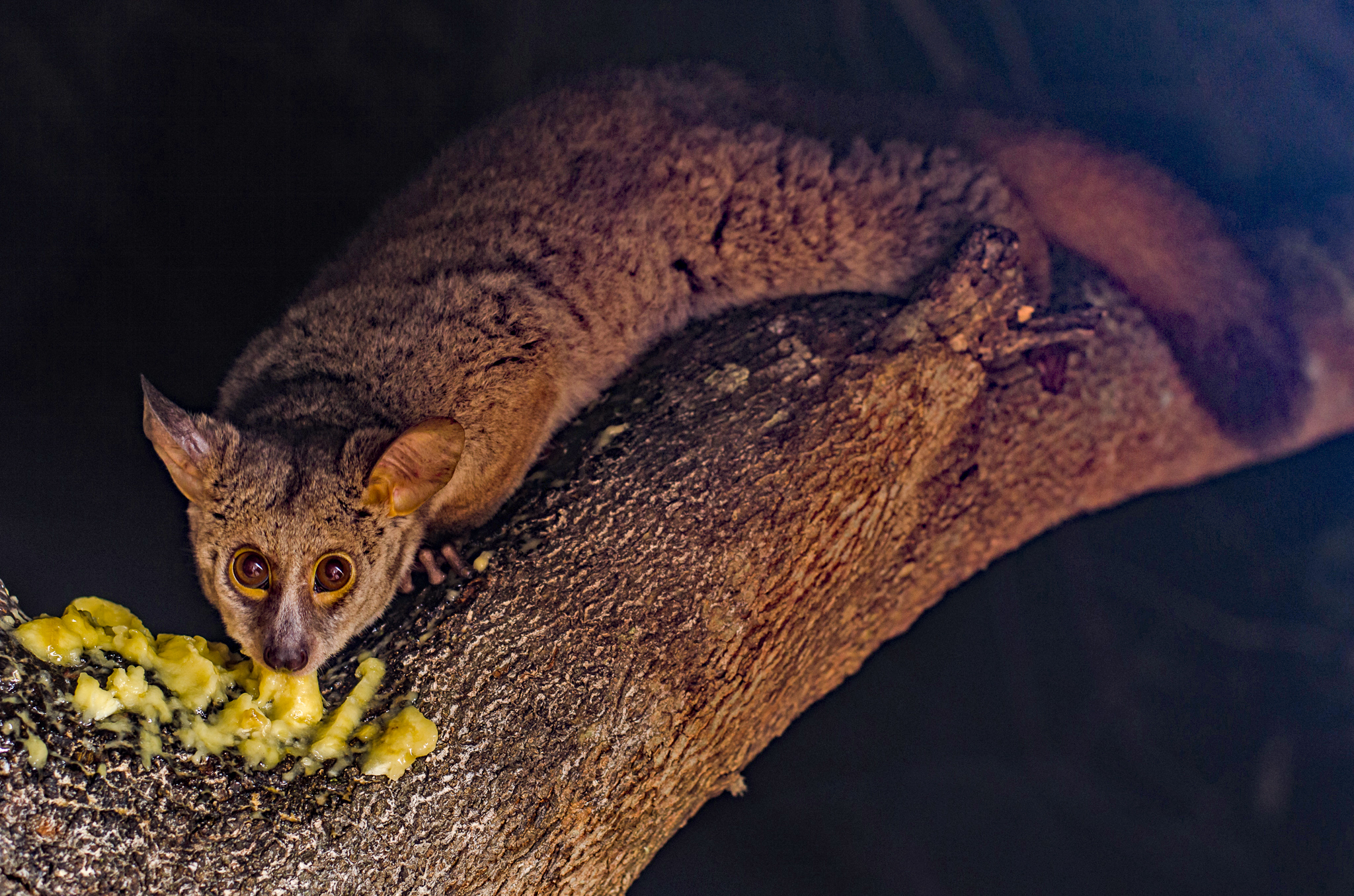

Conservation status
- Least Concern (IUCN 3.1)

Scientific classification
- Kingdom: Animalia
- Phylum: Chordata
- Class: Mammalia
- Infraclass: Placentalia
- Order: Primates
- Suborder: Strepsirrhini
- Family: Galagidae
- Genus: Otolemur
- Species: O. crassicaudatus

Binomial name
- Otolemur crassicaudatus É Geoffroy, 1812
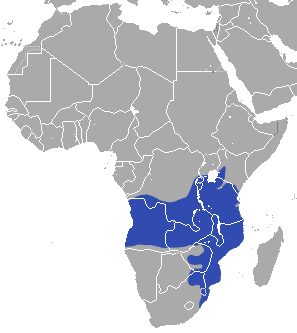
- Brown greater galago range

Synonyms
- List: Galago crassicaudatus (É. Geoffroy Saint-Hilaire, 1812); Otolicnus crassicaudatus (H. R. Schinz, 1821); Callotus monteiri (Bartlett in J. E. Gray, 1863); Otogale crassicaudata (J. E. Gray, 1863); Otogale crassicaudata var. kirkii (J. E. Gray, 1865); Otogale Monteiri (J. E. Gray, 1871); Galago crassicaudata (P. L. Sclater, 1872); Galago monteiri (P. L. Sclater, 1872); Otolienus crassicaudatus (von Heuglin, 1877); Otogale crassicaudatus (A. T. de Rochebrune, 1883); Otolycnus crassicaudatus (Noack, 1887); Otogale kirki (O. Thomas, 1894); Galago kirki (Matschie, 1895); Otolemur badius Matschie, 1906; Galago zuluensis (D. G. Elliot, 1907); Otolemur crassicaudatus A. Roberts, 1913; Otolemur crassicaudatus kirki A. Roberts, 1913; Galago badius (D. G. Elliot, 1913); Galago argentatus (Lönnberg, 1913); Galago crassicaudatus umbrosus (O. Thomas, 1917); Galago crassicaudatus lönnbergi (E. Schwarz, 1930); Otolemur crassicaudatus crassicaudatus Shortridge, 1934; Otolemur crassicaudatus monteiri Shortridge, 1934; Galago crassicaudatus lestradei (Schouteden, 1953); Galago (Otolemur) crassicaudatus monteiri (Hayman, 1963); Otolemur monteiri argentatus Grubb, Butynski, J. F. Oates, Bearder, Disotell, Groves, & Struhsaker, 2003; Otolemur crassicaudatus kirkii Grubb, Butynski, J. F. Oates, Bearder, Disotell, Groves, & Struhsaker, 2003; Otolemur monteiri Grubb, Butynski, J. F. Oates, Bearder, Disotell, Groves, & Struhsaker, 2003; Otolemur monteiri monteiri Grubb, Butynski, J. F. Oates, Bearder, Disotell, Groves, & Struhsaker, 2003; Otolemur crassicaudatus argentatus Mittermeier, Rylands, & D. E. Wilson, 2013

= Brown greater galago =

Species of primate

The brown greater galago (Otolemur crassicaudatus), also known as the large-eared greater galago or thick-tailed galago, is a nocturnal primate, the largest in the family of galagos. As opposed to smaller galago species it would climb, walk or run rather than leap.

== Taxonomy ==
Two subspecies of Otolemur crassicaudatus are recognised:

- O. c. crassicaudatus
- O. c. kirkii

The IUCN considers the silvery greater galago as a third subspecies, O. c. monteiri. Other sources treat it as a separate species, though with "misgivings". The IUCN Red List assesses all three forms individually as Least Concern.

== Physical characteristics ==
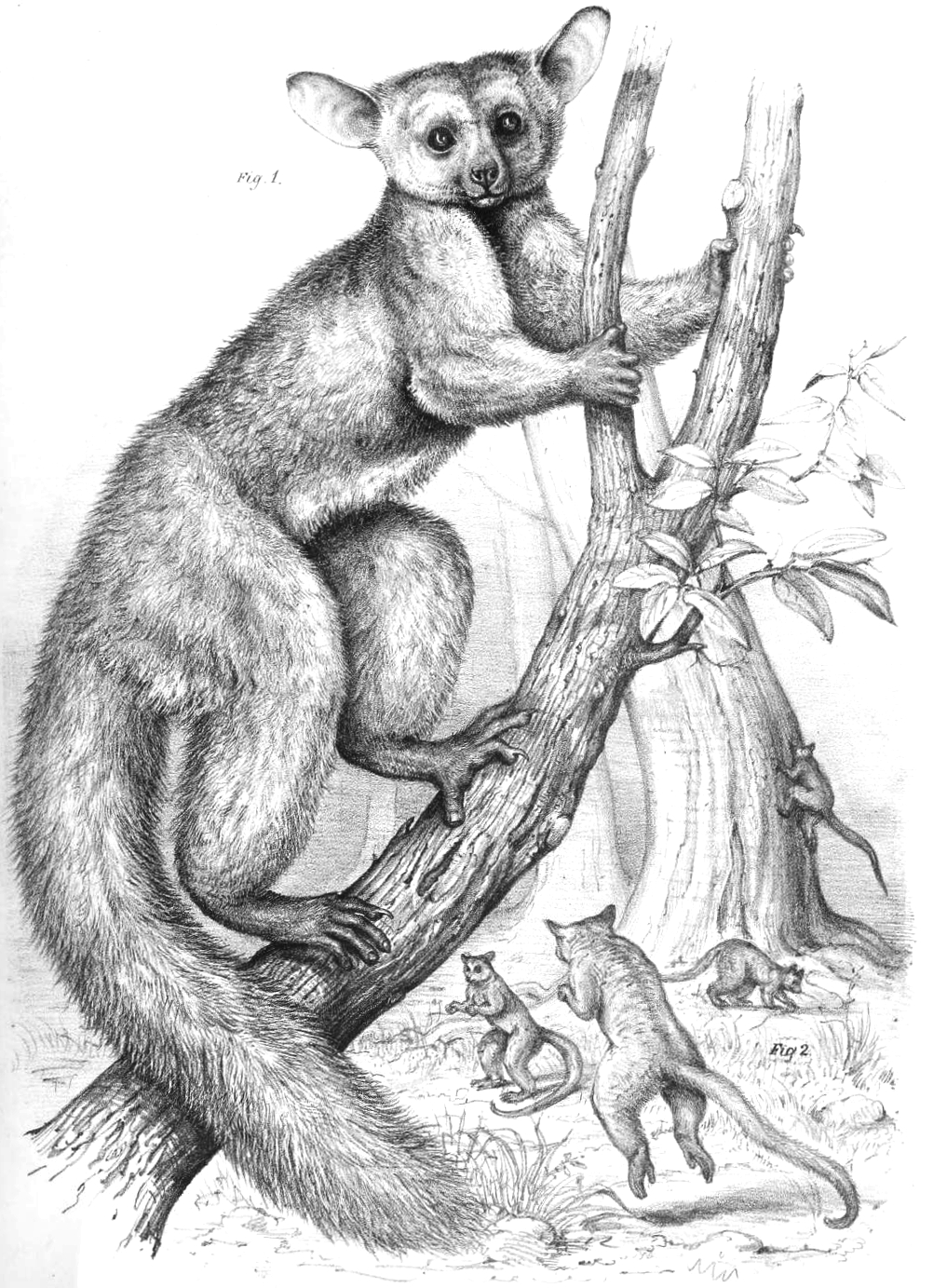
Illustration by Joseph Wolf

This species has a rounded head with a short, wide snout, very large ears that can be moved independently and relatively large forward binocular eyes. They possess flat thickened skin pads at the ends of their fingers and toes for grasping limbs. The fingers are long and toes are flattened with flattened nails. The dentition formula is I 2/2, C 1/1, P3 3/3, M3/3.

The thick fur is highly variable in color, depending on the subspecies: O. c. crassicaudatus exhibits dorsal pelage ranging from buff to gray extending to the face, flanks and limbs. The ventral fur is cream colored, and the tail has a darker tip. The hands and feet are darkened except on the digits. O. c. kirkii exhibits fur ranging from brown to grey on the dorsal surfaces. Ventrally, the fur is cream to yellow colored. The tail is usually light brown in this subspecies and the feet and hands lack darkening pattern.

The brown greater galago has a head-and-body length of 26 to 47 cm (32 cm on average), a tail length of 29 to 55 cm, and a weight of 0.5 to 2 kg. The brown greater galago exhibits sexual size dimorphism with males being larger than the females. This is due to bimaturism, a longer period of growth in the male, on average 84.5 more days. While males and females galagos grow at the same rate, this longer growth period results in males averaging 16% more body mass than females. On average females weigh 1.2 kg (2.6 lb), and males 1.5 kg (3.3 lb).

== Distribution and habitat ==
This species is common in Southern and East Africa. The largest populations are found in Angola, Tanzania, Rwanda, southern Kenya and the coast of Somalia. The brown greater galago lives in tropical and subtropical forest, preferring riverine and coastal forest, but it can also be found in the woodland savannah. The subspecies display different ranges: O. c. crassidautus is only found in the KwaZulu-Natal region. O. c. kirkii is found from Massangena north to Vila Coutinho, Mozambique and Malawi.

== Behaviour ==
The brown greater galago is a nocturnal, arboreal animal. During the day, it rests 5 to 12 meters (16 to 39 ft) above the ground in a dense tangle of creepers or in the hollow of a tree, rarely on an exposed branch. Female galagos will make nests, leafy platforms with foliage above to shelter their young. An individual galago may have several sleeping sites throughout its home range. At night, it emerges to forage for food. It moves quadrupedally through the trees or bush. This species is capable of short jumps from tree to tree when necessary. Its diet consists of fruit (like berries, figs), seeds, acacia gum, flowers, insects, slugs, and even reptiles and small birds. An individual galago on average spends 50% of its time each night traveling and only about 20% of its time foraging. It will often follow the same patrol pathway every night. Galago lifespan in captivity is 18 years or more. It is likely that life expectancy in the wild is lower.

=== Territory and social behavior ===
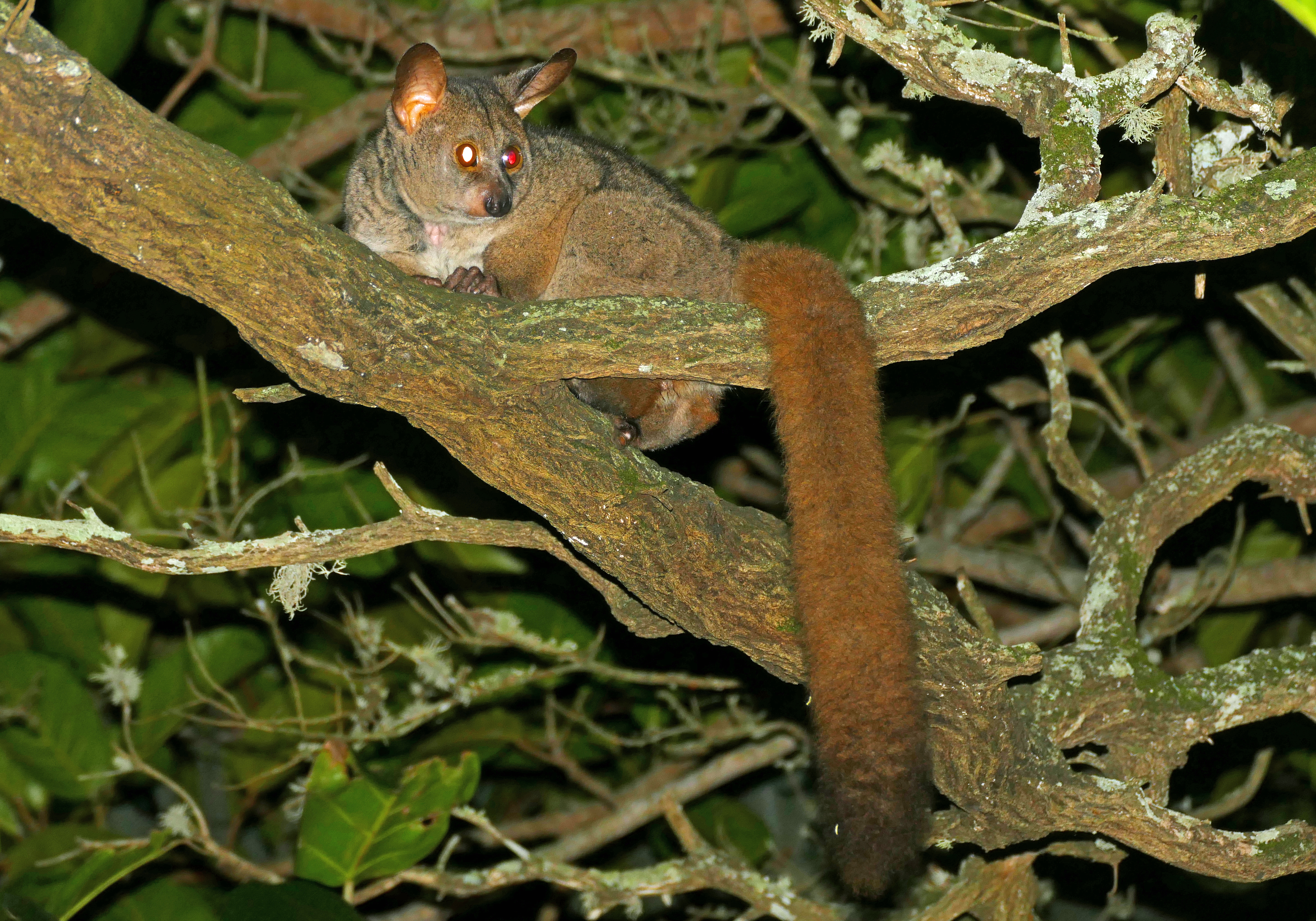
In Hluhluwe, South Africa

This species is solitary, living in a home range of a few hectares; however, there is some overlap with other individuals. Males have territories that overlap with a few females and females may have home ranges that overlap, but male territories generally do not overlap. Males tend to have a larger territory than females. The territory is marked by urine and a scent produced in a gland in the chest. Social interaction generally occurs at sites of range overlap, sites of large gum resources or prime sleeping trees. Social play is also exhibited by juveniles, sub adults and adult females with juveniles. Social grooming is absent in the greater galagos compared to other primate species. It is instead filled with a behavior known as reciprocal licking to clean each other's fur.

Vocal communication is very important in galago species with significant research systematically identifying types of calls including: raucous cry call, alarm call, contact rejection calls, distress call, infant call, mother call, advertising call.

=== Reproduction morphology and behaviour ===
Male galagos species possess very distinctive penile morphology that can be used to classify species. In O. crassicaudatus, the penis is on average 20 mm (0.79 in) in length and increases in width towards the distal tip. The baculum clearly protrudes from the end. The glans and shaft are covered in single keratinised penile spines that point towards the body.

During mating season which occurs in June, the female goes into estrus for approximately 2 weeks. She uses an advertising call to indicate her receptivity. Males approach and copulate repeatedly with the female and maintain intromission with the female for several hours. Mating patterns can be either monogamous or polygynous, often determined by the overlapping of host ranges and competing of males for best territories. Females typically give birth to 2 young, sometimes 1 or 3. The gestation period is on average 133 days. The female typically reaches sexual maturity by 2 years of age. Because of competition between males based upon size males usually reach reproductive age later than females. After birth, the mother leaves the young to forage and returns nourishing the young with nutrient rich milk. The juveniles typically remain with their mother until they reach close to sexual maturity.

== Conservation ==
The brown greater galago is listed as Least Concern by the International Union for Conservation of Nature (IUCN). The species is thought to be common in well managed protected areas. The only major threat to the species is hunting for bushmeat. Habitat fragmentation is increasing across their range, with sugar cane and forestry in South Africa being a main cause.
