= Vesperus serranoi =

Scientific classification
- Domain: Eukaryota
- Kingdom: Animalia
- Phylum: Arthropoda
- Class: Insecta
- Order: Coleoptera
- Suborder: Polyphaga
- Infraorder: Cucujiformia
- Family: Vesperidae
- Genus: Vesperus
- Species: V. serranoi

Binomial name
- Vesperus serranoi Zuzarte, 1985

Species of beetle

Vesperus serranoi is a species of beetle in the Vesperidae family that is endemic to the Iberian Peninsula.
