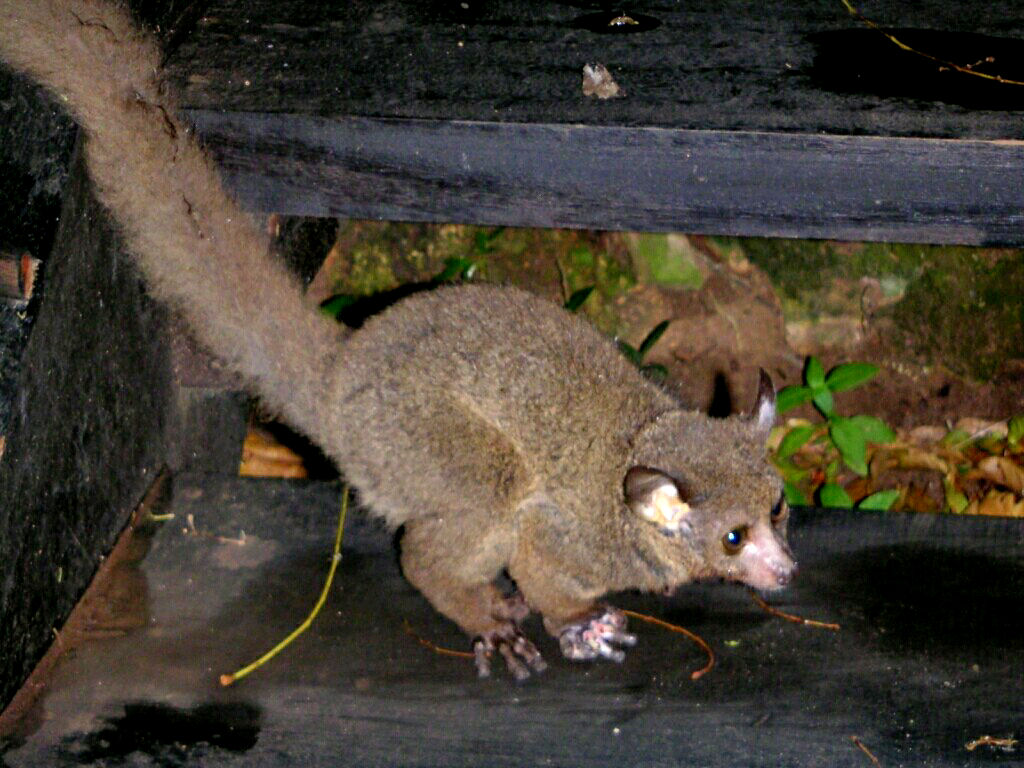
- Brown greater galago (O. crassicaudatus)

Scientific classification
- Kingdom: Animalia
- Phylum: Chordata
- Class: Mammalia
- Order: Primates
- Suborder: Strepsirrhini
- Family: Galagidae
- Genus: Otolemur; Coquerel, 1859

Type species
- Otolemur agyisymbanus Coquerel, 1859 ( = Otolicnus garnetti Ogilby, 1838)

Species
- Otolemur crassicaudatus Otolemur monteiri Otolemur garnettii

= Greater galago =

Otolemur

Genus of primates

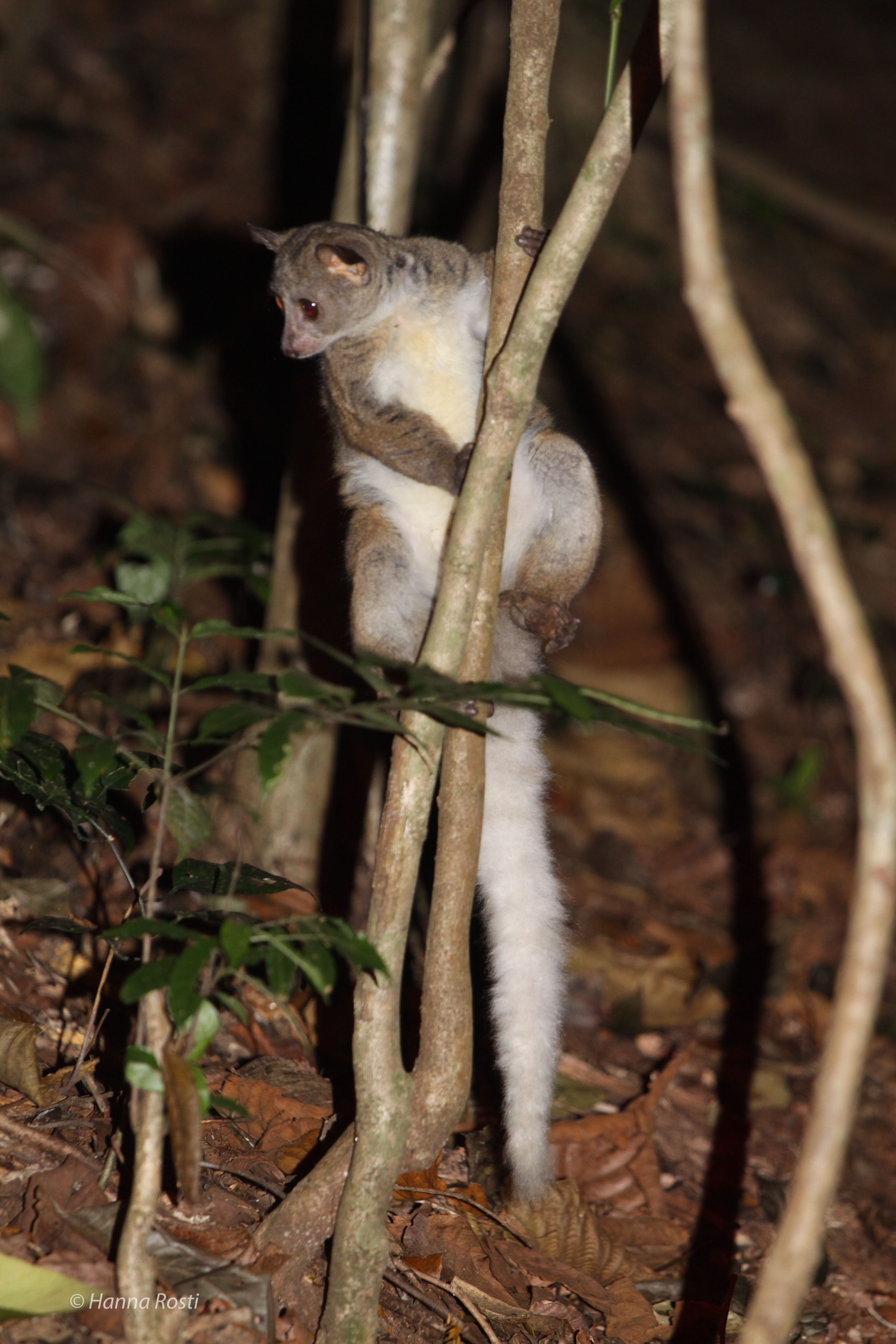
Northern greater galago (O. garnettii)

The greater galagos or thick-tailed bushbabies are three species of strepsirrhine primates. They are classified in the genus Otolemur in the family Galagidae.

== Historical classification and species discovery ==
The diversity of galago species has historically been grossly underestimated. In 1931, only 5 species were recognized, 4 in the genus Galago and 1 in Euoticus, and only one species that would later be placed in the genus Otolemur. In 1979, the genus Otolemur was separated from Galago. By 1986, eleven species were recognized with revamped systemic classification including Otolemur crassicaudatus and Otolemur garnettii. Additionally, O. crassidautus and O. monteiri were recognized as separate species instead of O. monteiri as a nested subspecies. By 2001, 23 species were recognized. Classification by vocalization has particularly become prevalent and helpful as a tool in understanding of these species. All Otolemur species exhibit trailing advertising calls.

== Distribution and habitat ==
The species is found in and around coastal regions of Southern and Southeastern Africa; north from the Juba River in Somalia, southwards through Kenya, Tanzania, Malawi, and Mozambique; west across Zimbabwe, Zambia, and Botswana; southwest to northern South Africa and as far west as Angola and Namibia. For the most part, they live in woodlands and forests, but also are found in sparsely wooded grasslands and even planted city parks and gardens.

== Taxonomy ==
Genus Otolemur – Coquerel, 1859 – two species
Common name	Scientific name and subspecies	Range	Size and ecology	IUCN status and estimated population
Brown greater galago	O. crassicaudatus (É. Geoffroy, 1812) Three subspecies: O. c. crassicaudatus (South African greater galago); O. c. kirkii (Tanganyika greater galago); O. c. monteiri (Silvery greater galago)	Southern Africa	Size: 29–38 cm (11–15 in) long, plus 41–48 cm (16–19 in) tail Habitat: Forest, savanna, and shrubland Diet: Gum and sap, as well as fruit and insects	LC Unknown
Northern greater galago	O. garnettii (Ogilby, 1838) Four subspecies: O. g. garnettii (Zanzibar greater galago); O. g. kikuyuensis (Kikuyu greater galago); O. g. lasiotis (White-tailed greater galago); O. g. panganiensis (Pangani greater galago)	Eastern Africa	Size: 23–34 cm (9–13 in) long, plus about 36 cm (14 in) tail Habitat: Forest Diet: Fruit and insects	LC Unknown
