= Vesperus xatarti =

Scientific classification
- Domain: Eukaryota
- Kingdom: Animalia
- Phylum: Arthropoda
- Class: Insecta
- Order: Coleoptera
- Suborder: Polyphaga
- Infraorder: Cucujiformia
- Family: Vesperidae
- Genus: Vesperus
- Species: V. xatarti

Binomial name
- Vesperus xatarti (Mulsant, 1839)

Species of beetle

Vesperus xatarti is a species of brown coloured beetle in the family Vesperidae, found in the Balearic Islands, France, and Spain.
