= Auxa armata =

Scientific classification
- Kingdom: Animalia
- Phylum: Arthropoda
- Clade: Pancrustacea
- Class: Insecta
- Order: Coleoptera
- Suborder: Polyphaga
- Infraorder: Cucujiformia
- Family: Cerambycidae
- Genus: Auxa
- Species: A. armata

Binomial name
- Auxa armata (Coquerel, 1851)

Species of beetle

Auxa armata is a species of longhorn beetle in the subfamily Lamiinae. It was described by Charles Coquerel in 1851.
