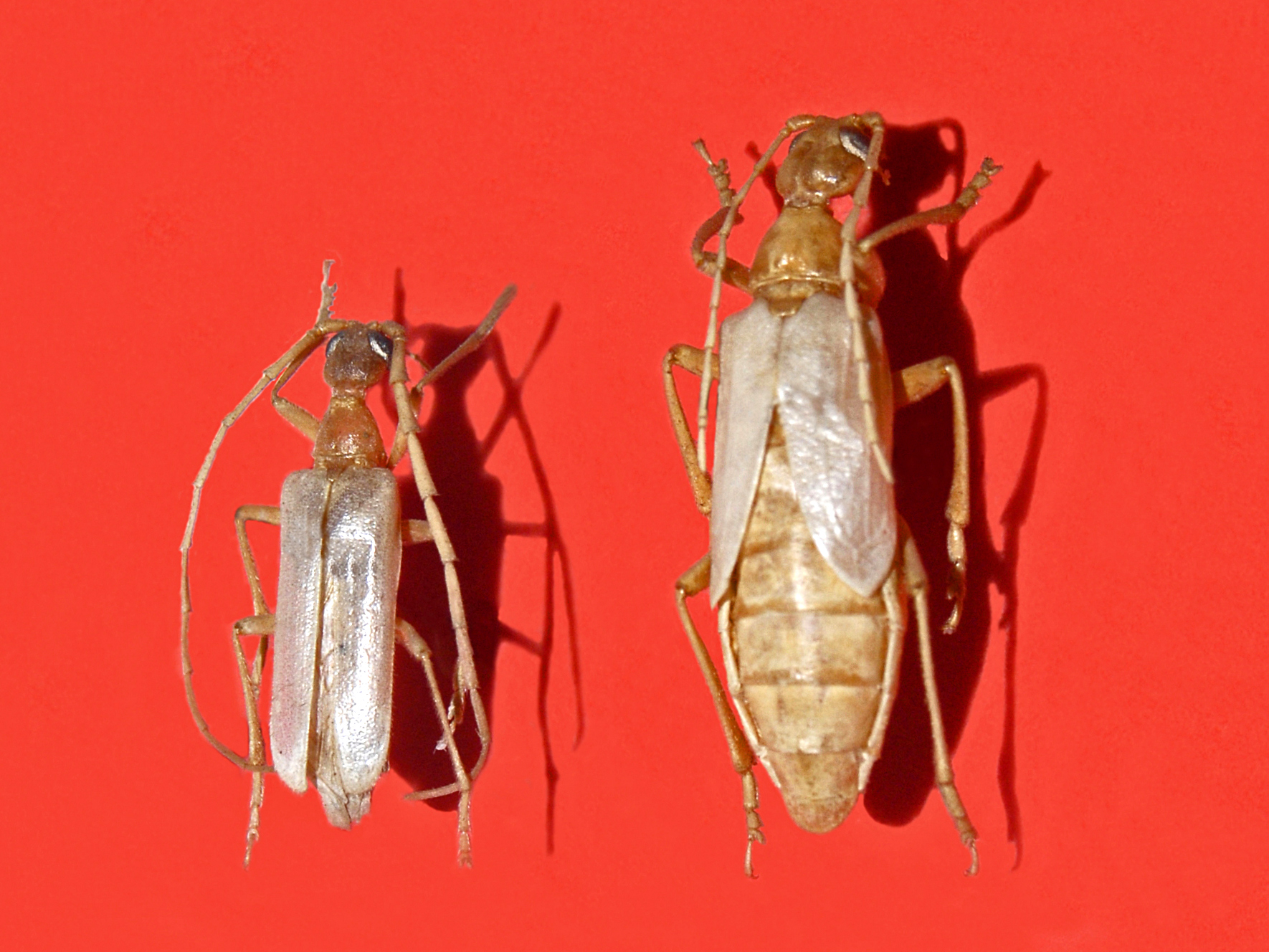
- Museum specimen of Vesperus luridus, male and female

Scientific classification
- Domain: Eukaryota
- Kingdom: Animalia
- Phylum: Arthropoda
- Class: Insecta
- Order: Coleoptera
- Suborder: Polyphaga
- Infraorder: Cucujiformia
- Family: Vesperidae
- Genus: Vesperus
- Species: V. luridus

Binomial name
- Vesperus luridus (Rossi, 1794)

Synonyms
- Calopus serraticornis Rossi, 1790 nec Linnaeus, 1758; Leptura solieri Guérin-Méneville, 1844; Stenocorus luridus Rossi, 1794; Vesperus solieri Germar, 1836; Vesperus strepens (Fabricius) Schonherr, 1817

= Vesperus luridus =

Species of beetle

Vesperus luridus is a species of beetle in the Vesperidae family

== Description ==
Vesperus luridus can reach a body length (from front to elytral apex) of about 12–18 millimetres (0.47–0.71 in) in males, while females reach a size of about 16–22 millimetres (0.63–0.87 in). Elytra are elongate and body is slender. Basic coloration is brownish or yellowish diaphanous. Both males and females are of the same colour,

This species shows an evident sexual dimorphism. The males are small, have wings and the elytra completely cover the abdomen. The antennas are much longer than in females. On the contrary the females are bigger, have very reduced wings (brachyptery) and are characterised by a swollen abdomen (physogastrism) holding enlarged ovaries. Elytra cover only partially the voluminous abdomen, letting visible the abdominal tergites.

Adults of this species are nocturnals and can be encountered from late summer to autumn. The flying males become active at dusk and are attracted by artificial light. Larvae of these beetles have evolved some adaptations to subterranean life. In particular, they are characterised by a peculiar larval hypermetamorphosis, with some polymorphic larval instars. Larvae are polyphagous, but mainly feed on Grape-vine (Vitis vinifera) and Common Olive (Olea europaea). They are considered harmful to the cultivation of the grapevines, as the larvae dig tunnels in the roots.

== Distribution ==
This species can be found in Croatia, France, Italy (including islands Sardinia and Sicily), Kosovo, Montenegro, Serbia, and Voivodina.
