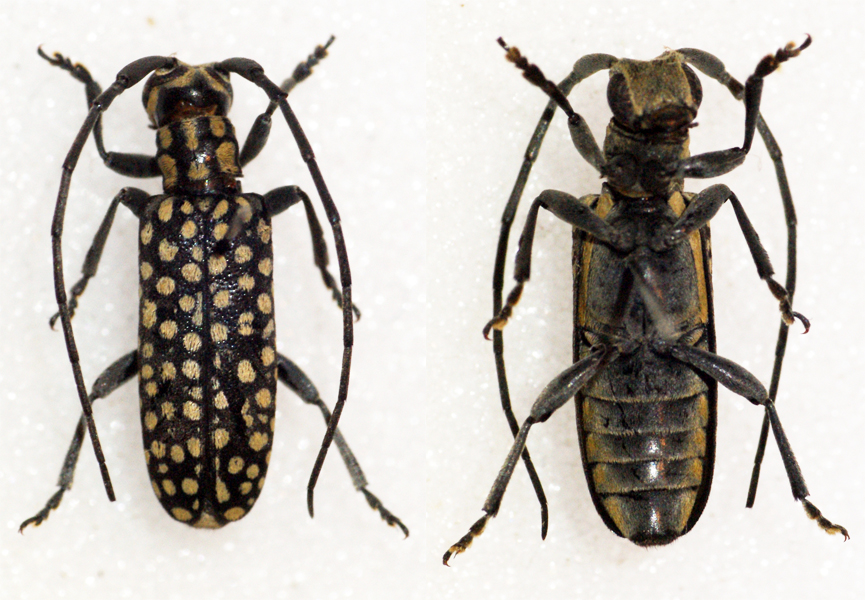

Scientific classification
- Kingdom: Animalia
- Phylum: Arthropoda
- Clade: Pancrustacea
- Class: Insecta
- Order: Coleoptera
- Suborder: Polyphaga
- Infraorder: Cucujiformia
- Family: Cerambycidae
- Genus: Eunidia
- Species: E. guttulata

Binomial name
- Eunidia guttulata (Coquerel, 1851)

Synonyms
- Eunidia alboguttata Aurivillius, 1914; Semiclinia denseguttata Fairmaire, 1898; Sphenura guttula Coquerel, 1852; Sphenura guttulata Coquerel, 1851

= Eunidia guttulata =

Species of beetle

Eunidia guttulata is a species of beetle in the family Cerambycidae. It was described by Charles Coquerel in 1851, originally under the genus Sphenura.
