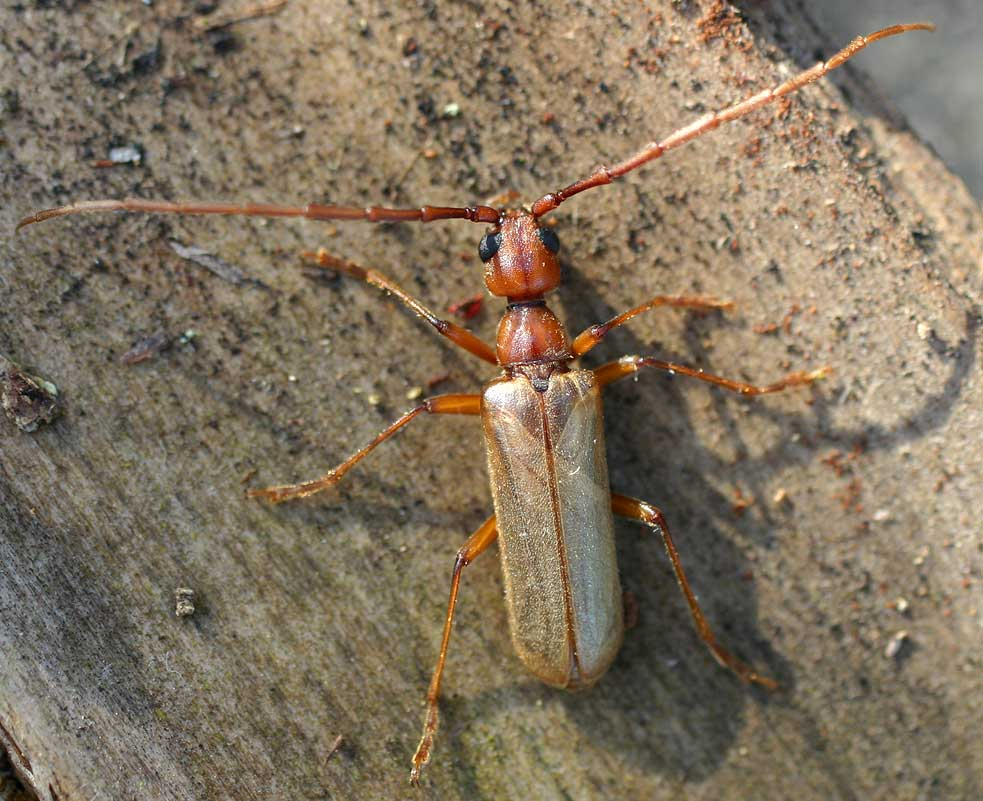

Scientific classification
- Domain: Eukaryota
- Kingdom: Animalia
- Phylum: Arthropoda
- Class: Insecta
- Order: Coleoptera
- Suborder: Polyphaga
- Infraorder: Cucujiformia
- Family: Vesperidae
- Genus: Vesperus
- Species: V. strepens

Binomial name
- Vesperus strepens (Fabricius, 1792)

Synonyms
- Stenocorus strepens Fabricius, 1792; Vesperus litigiosus Mulsant, 1862; Vesperus ligusticus Vitali, 2001

= Vesperus strepens =

Species of beetle

Vesperus strepens is a species of brown coloured beetle in the family Vesperidae, found in France and Italy.
