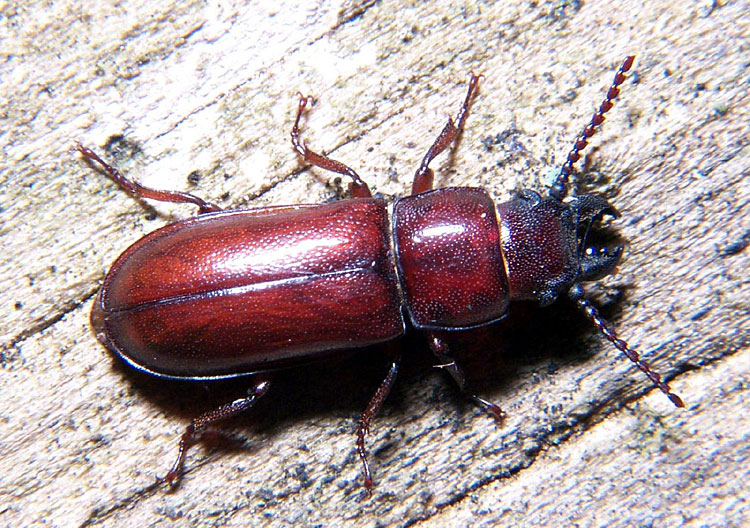
- Neandra brunnea

Scientific classification
- Kingdom: Animalia
- Phylum: Arthropoda
- Class: Insecta
- Order: Coleoptera
- Suborder: Polyphaga
- Infraorder: Cucujiformia
- Family: Cerambycidae
- Subfamily: Parandrinae; Blanchard 1845

= Parandrinae =

Subfamily of beetles

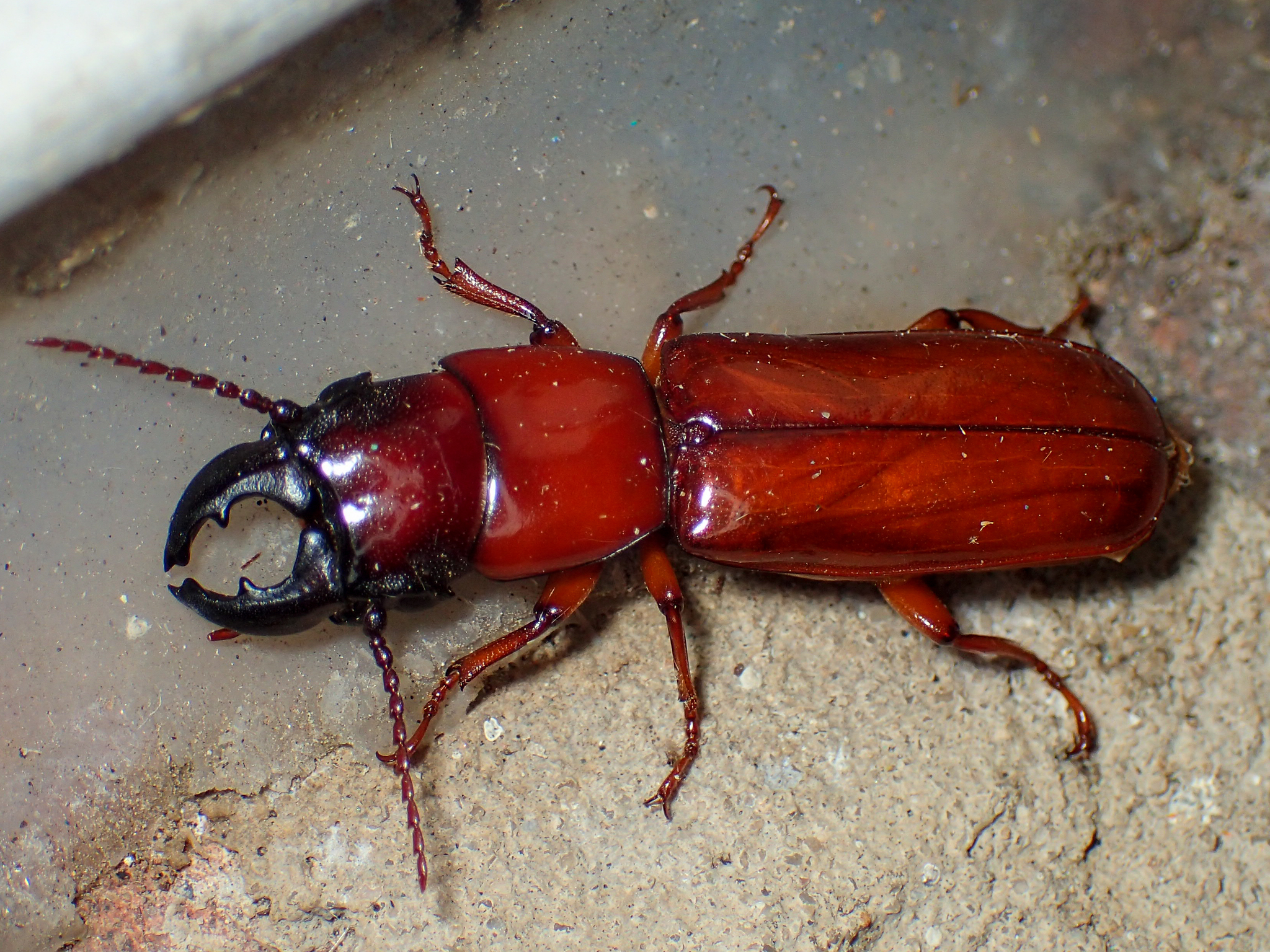
Parandra polita, Alabama

Parandrinae is a subfamily of Long-Horned Beetles in the beetle family Cerambycidae. There are about 14 genera and more than 120 described species in Parandrinae.

Atypical for cerambycids, the antennae are quite short species in Parandrinae, and the tarsi have 5 easily visible segments; they are thus rather similar in appearance to stag beetles.

== Genera ==
These 14 genera belong to the subfamily Parandrinae:

Tribe Erichsoniini

Erichsonia Westwood, 1849

Tribe Parandrini Blanchard 1845

Acutandra Santos-Silva, 2002
Adlbauerandra Bouyer, Drumont & Santos-Silva, 2012
Archandra Lameere, 1912
Birandra Santos-Silva, 2002
Caledonandra Santos-Silva, Heffern & Matsuda, 2010
Hawaiiandra Santos-Silva, Heffern & Matsuda, 2010
Komiyandra Santos-Silva, Heffern & Matsuda, 2010
Malukandra Santos-Silva, Heffern & Matsuda, 2010
Meridiandra Bouyer, Drumont & Santos-Silva, 2012
Neandra Lameere, 1912
Parandra Latreille, 1802
Stenandra Lameere, 1912
Storeyandra Santos-Silva, Heffern & Matsuda, 2010
