= Vesperus brevicollis =

Scientific classification
- Domain: Eukaryota
- Kingdom: Animalia
- Phylum: Arthropoda
- Class: Insecta
- Order: Coleoptera
- Suborder: Polyphaga
- Infraorder: Cucujiformia
- Family: Vesperidae
- Genus: Vesperus
- Species: V. brevicollis

Binomial name
- Vesperus brevicollis Graells, 1858

Species of beetle

Vesperus brevicollis is a species of brown coloured western European beetle in the family Vesperidae, found in Portugal and Spain.
