= Vesperus sanzi =

Scientific classification
- Kingdom: Animalia
- Phylum: Arthropoda
- Class: Insecta
- Order: Coleoptera
- Suborder: Polyphaga
- Infraorder: Cucujiformia
- Family: Vesperidae
- Genus: Vesperus
- Species: V. sanzi

Binomial name
- Vesperus sanzi Reitter, 1895

Synonyms
- Vesperus brevicollis var. sanzi Reitter, 1895

Species of beetle

Vesperus sanzi is a species of beetle in the Vesperidae family that can be found in Portugal and western Spain.
