= Vesperus fuentei =

Scientific classification
- Kingdom: Animalia
- Phylum: Arthropoda
- Class: Insecta
- Order: Coleoptera
- Suborder: Polyphaga
- Infraorder: Cucujiformia
- Family: Vesperidae
- Genus: Vesperus
- Species: V. fuentei

Binomial name
- Vesperus fuentei Pic, 1905

Species of beetle

Vesperus fuentei is a species of beetle in the Vesperidae family that is endemic to Spain.
