= Tropidema =

Scientific classification
- Kingdom: Animalia
- Phylum: Arthropoda
- Class: Insecta
- Order: Coleoptera
- Suborder: Polyphaga
- Infraorder: Cucujiformia
- Family: Cerambycidae
- Tribe: Desmiphorini
- Genus: Tropidema; Thomson, 1864
- Species: T. chrysocephala

Binomial name
- Tropidema chrysocephala (Coquerel, 1851)

Genus of beetles

Tropidema chrysocephala is a species of beetle in the family Cerambycidae, and the only species in the genus Tropidema. It was described by Charles Coquerel in 1851.
