= Vesperus joanivivesi =

Scientific classification
- Kingdom: Animalia
- Phylum: Arthropoda
- Class: Insecta
- Order: Coleoptera
- Suborder: Polyphaga
- Infraorder: Cucujiformia
- Family: Vesperidae
- Genus: Vesperus
- Species: V. joanivivesi

Binomial name
- Vesperus joanivivesi Vives, 1998

Species of beetle

Vesperus joanivivesi is a species of brown coloured beetle in the family Vesperidae that is endemic to Spain.
