= Vesperus barredai =

Scientific classification
- Domain: Eukaryota
- Kingdom: Animalia
- Phylum: Arthropoda
- Class: Insecta
- Order: Coleoptera
- Suborder: Polyphaga
- Infraorder: Cucujiformia
- Family: Vesperidae
- Genus: Vesperus
- Species: V. barredai

Binomial name
- Vesperus barredai Verdugo, 2009

Species of beetle

Vesperus barredai is a species of beetle in the Vesperidae family that can be found in Portugal and Spain. It is a rare, nocturnal beetle endemic to southern Iberia, with males active from August to October and females remaining hidden under debris. Its colour is black, and it has yellow legs and antennae.
