= Erichsonia =

Erichsonia dentifrons

Scientific classification
- Kingdom: Animalia
- Phylum: Arthropoda
- Class: Insecta
- Order: Coleoptera
- Suborder: Polyphaga
- Infraorder: Cucujiformia
- Family: Cerambycidae
- Subfamily: Parandrinae
- Genus: Erichsonia; Westwood, 1849
- Species: E. dentifrons

Binomial name
- Erichsonia dentifrons Westwood, 1849

Genus of beetles

Erichsonia dentifrons is a species of beetle in the family Cerambycidae, the only species in the genus Erichsonia.
