= Auxa gibbicollis =

Scientific classification
- Kingdom: Animalia
- Phylum: Arthropoda
- Clade: Pancrustacea
- Class: Insecta
- Order: Coleoptera
- Suborder: Polyphaga
- Infraorder: Cucujiformia
- Family: Cerambycidae
- Genus: Auxa
- Species: A. gibbicollis

Binomial name
- Auxa gibbicollis Fairmaire, 1897

Species of beetle

Auxa gibbicollis is a species of beetle in the family Cerambycidae. It was described by Fairmaire in 1897.
