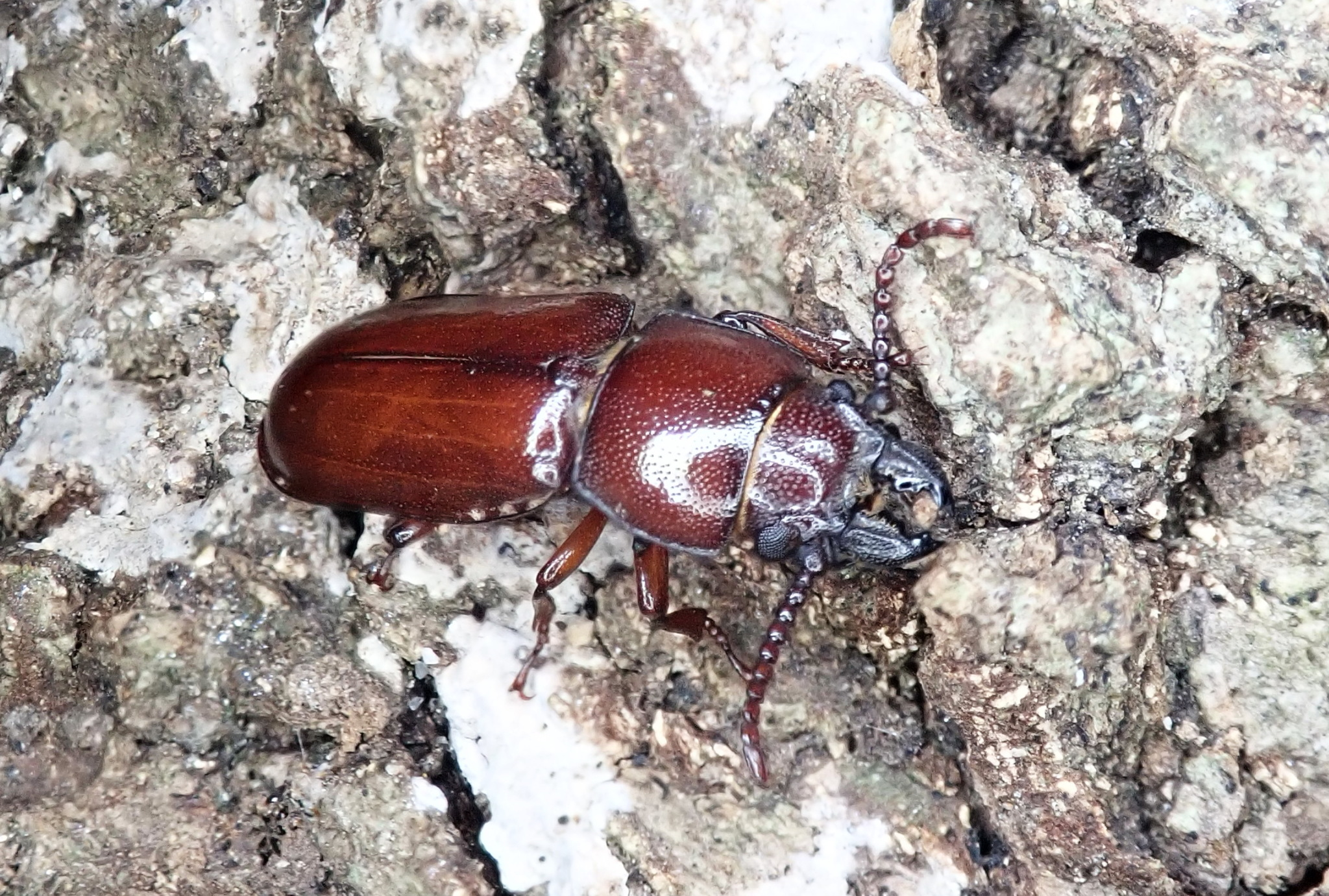
- Neandra brunnea, Virginia

Scientific classification
- Kingdom: Animalia
- Phylum: Arthropoda
- Class: Insecta
- Order: Coleoptera
- Suborder: Polyphaga
- Infraorder: Cucujiformia
- Family: Cerambycidae
- Subfamily: Parandrinae
- Genus: Neandra; Lameere, 1912

= Neandra =

Genus of longhorn beetles

Neandra is a genus of Long-Horned Beetles in the beetle family Cerambycidae. There are at least two described species in Neandra.

== Species ==
These two species belong to the genus Neandra:

- Neandra brunnea (Fabricius, 1798) (North America, South Africa, and Germany)
- Neandra marginicollis (Schaeffer, 1929) (United States)
