= Neandra marginicollis =

Scientific classification
- Domain: Eukaryota
- Kingdom: Animalia
- Phylum: Arthropoda
- Class: Insecta
- Order: Coleoptera
- Suborder: Polyphaga
- Infraorder: Cucujiformia
- Family: Cerambycidae
- Genus: Neandra
- Species: N. marginicollis

Binomial name
- Neandra marginicollis Schaeffer, 1929

Species of beetle

Neandra marginicollis is a species of long-horned beetle in the family Cerambycidae. It is found in North America.

== Subspecies ==
These two subspecies belong to the species Neandra marginicollis:

- Neandra marginicollis marginicollis Schaeffer, 1929
- Neandra marginicollis punctillata Schaeffer, 1929
