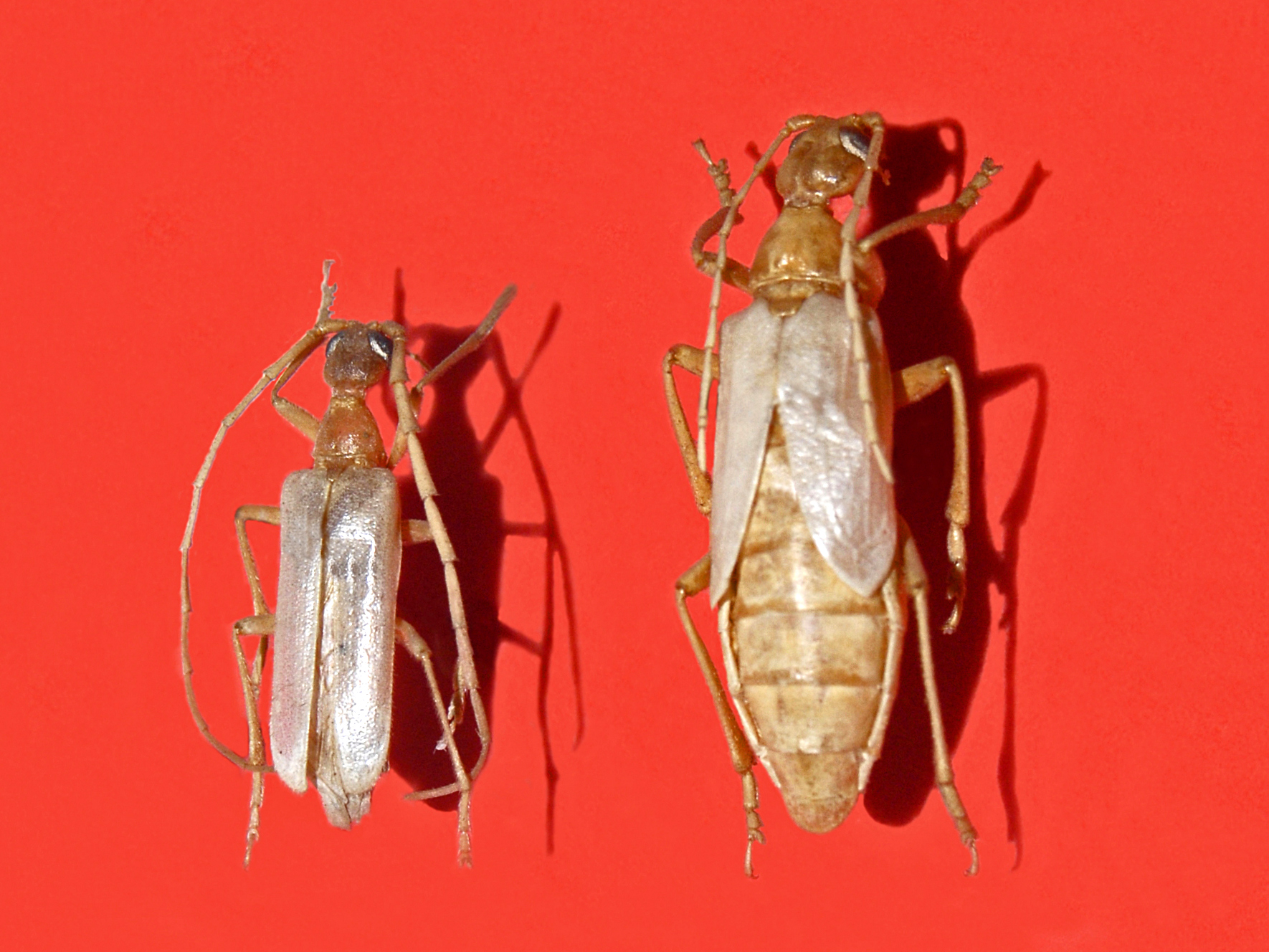
- Museum specimen of Vesperus luridus, male and female

Scientific classification
- Domain: Eukaryota
- Kingdom: Animalia
- Phylum: Arthropoda
- Class: Insecta
- Order: Coleoptera
- Suborder: Polyphaga
- Infraorder: Cucujiformia
- Family: Vesperidae
- Subfamily: Vesperinae
- Tribe: Vesperini; Mulsant, 1839
- Genus: Vesperus; Dejean, 1821

= Vesperus =

Genus of beetles

Vesperus is a genus of beetles in the family Vesperidae.

== Species ==
- Vesperus aragonicus Baraud, 1964
- Vesperus barredai Verdugo, 2009
- Vesperus bolivari Oliveira, 1893
- Vesperus brevicollis Graells, 1858
- Vesperus conicicollis Faimaire & Coquerel, 1866
- Vesperus creticus Ganglbauer, 1886
- Vesperus flaveolus Mulsant & Rey, 1863
- Vesperus fuentei Pic, 1905
- Vesperus gomezi Verdugo, 2004
- Vesperus jertensis Bercedo & Bahillo, 1999
- Vesperus joanivivesi Vives, 1998
- Vesperus ligusticus Vitali, 2001
- Vesperus luridus (Rossi, 1794)
- Vesperus macropterus Sama, 1999
- Vesperus nigellus Compte, 1963
- Vesperus ocularis Mulsant & Rey, 1863
- Vesperus sanzi Reitter, 1895
- Vesperus serranoi Zuzarte, 1985
- Vesperus strepens (Fabricius, 1793)
- Vesperus xatarti Dufour, 1839
