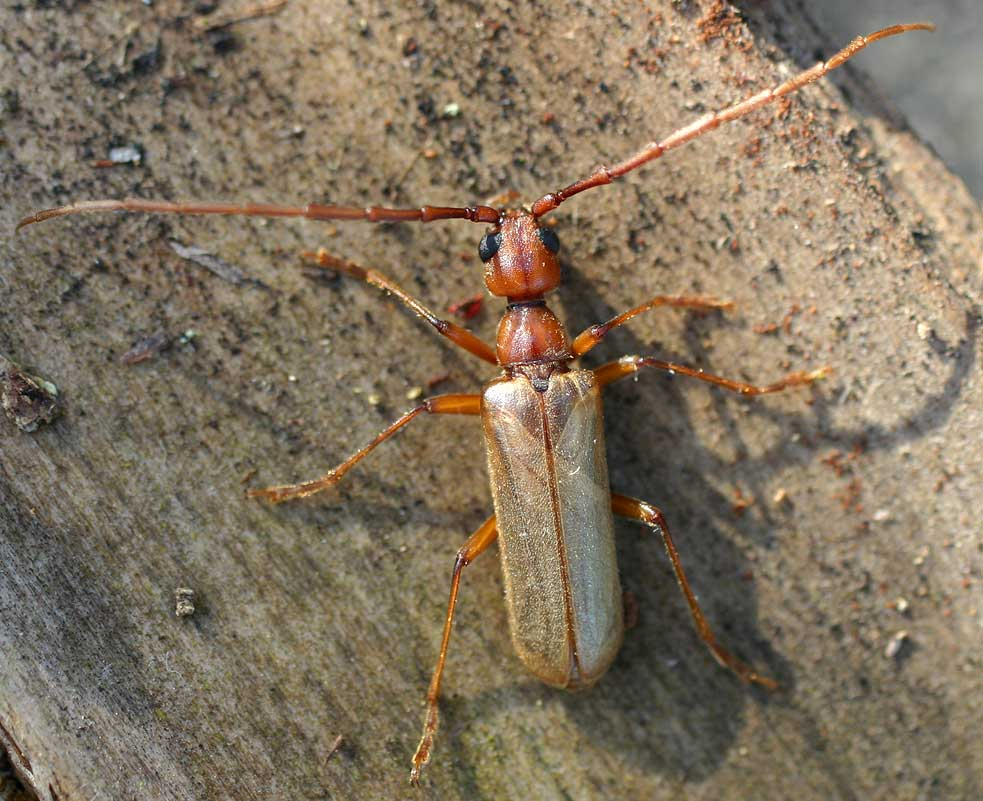
- Vesperus strepens

Scientific classification
- Domain: Eukaryota
- Kingdom: Animalia
- Phylum: Arthropoda
- Class: Insecta
- Order: Coleoptera
- Suborder: Polyphaga
- Infraorder: Cucujiformia
- Family: Vesperidae
- Subfamily: Vesperinae; Mulsant, 1839

Tribes
- Vesperini; Vesperoctenini

= Vesperinae =

Subfamily of beetles

Vesperinae is a subfamily of beetles in the family Vesperidae. It contains two monotypic tribes, Vesperini and Vesperoctenini.

== Tribes and genera ==
- Tribe Vesperini Mulsant, 1839
  - Genus Vesperus Dejean, 1821
- Tribe Vesperoctenini Vives, 2005
  - Genus Vesperoctenus Bates, 1891
