= Auxa basirufipennis =

Scientific classification
- Kingdom: Animalia
- Phylum: Arthropoda
- Class: Insecta
- Order: Coleoptera
- Suborder: Polyphaga
- Infraorder: Cucujiformia
- Family: Cerambycidae
- Genus: Auxa
- Species: A. basirufipennis

Binomial name
- Auxa basirufipennis Breuning, 1980

Species of beetle

Auxa basirufipennis is a species of longhorn beetle in the subfamily Lamiinae. It was described by Stephan von Breuning in 1980 and is endemic to Madagascar.
