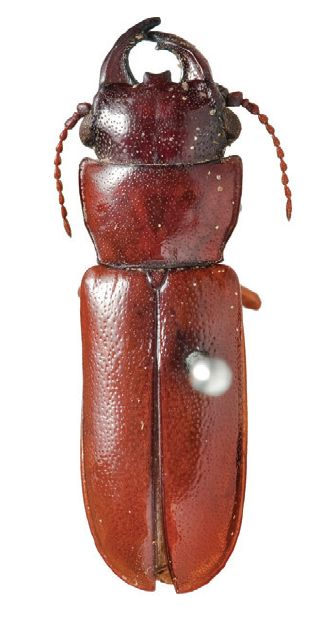
- Birandra latreillei

Scientific classification
- Kingdom: Animalia
- Phylum: Arthropoda
- Class: Insecta
- Order: Coleoptera
- Suborder: Polyphaga
- Infraorder: Cucujiformia
- Family: Cerambycidae
- Subfamily: Parandrinae
- Tribe: Parandrini
- Genus: Birandra; Santos-Silva, 2002

Synonyms
- Yvesandra Santos-Silva & Shute, 2009

= Birandra =

Genus of beetles

Birandra is a genus of Long-Horned Beetles in the beetle family Cerambycidae. There are about 14 described species in Birandra.

== Species ==
These 14 species belong to the genus Birandra:

- Birandra angulicollis (Bates, 1879) (Mexico and Central America)
- Birandra antioquensis (Cardona, Santos & Wolff, 2007) (Colombia)
- Birandra antonkozlovi Santos-Silva, Nascimento & Le Tirant, 2018 (Peru)
- Birandra boucheri Santos-Silva & Lezama, 2010 (Costa Rica and Panama)
- Birandra cribrata (Thomson, 1861) (Cuba)
- Birandra cubaecola (Chevrolat, 1862) (Cuba)
- Birandra lata (Bates, 1884) (Mexico)
- Birandra latreillei (Santos-Silva & Shute, 2009) (Cuba, Haiti, Jamaica, and the Dominican Republic)
- Birandra lucanoides (Thomson, 1861) (Colombia and Venezuela)
- Birandra mariahelenae (Santos-Silva, 2002) (Jamaica)
- Birandra pinchoni (Villiers, 1979) (the Dominican Republic, Guadeloupe, and Martinique)
- Birandra punctata (White, 1853) (Central and South America)
- Birandra silvaini (Tavakilian, 2000) (South America)
- Birandra tavakiliani Santos-Silva, 2002 (Puerto Rico)
