= Hawaiiandra =

Scientific classification
- Domain: Eukaryota
- Kingdom: Animalia
- Phylum: Arthropoda
- Class: Insecta
- Order: Coleoptera
- Suborder: Polyphaga
- Infraorder: Cucujiformia
- Family: Cerambycidae
- Subfamily: Parandrinae
- Tribe: Parandrini
- Genus: Hawaiiandra; Santos-Silva, Heffern & Matsuda, 2010
- Species: H. puncticeps

Binomial name
- Hawaiiandra puncticeps (Sharp, 1878)

Genus of beetles

Hawaiiandra is a monotypic genus of long-horned beetles in the family Cerambycidae containing the only species Hawaiiandra puncticeps.
