= Caledonandra =

Scientific classification
- Kingdom: Animalia
- Phylum: Arthropoda
- Class: Insecta
- Order: Coleoptera
- Suborder: Polyphaga
- Infraorder: Cucujiformia
- Family: Cerambycidae
- Subfamily: Parandrinae
- Genus: Caledonandra; Santos-Silva, Heffern & Matsuda, 2010

Genus of beetles

Caledonandra is a genus of long-horned beetles in the beetle family Cerambycidae. There are 2 described species in Caledonandra.

== Species ==
- Caledonandra austrocaledonica (Montrouzier, 1861)
- Caledonandra passandroides (Thomson, 1867)
