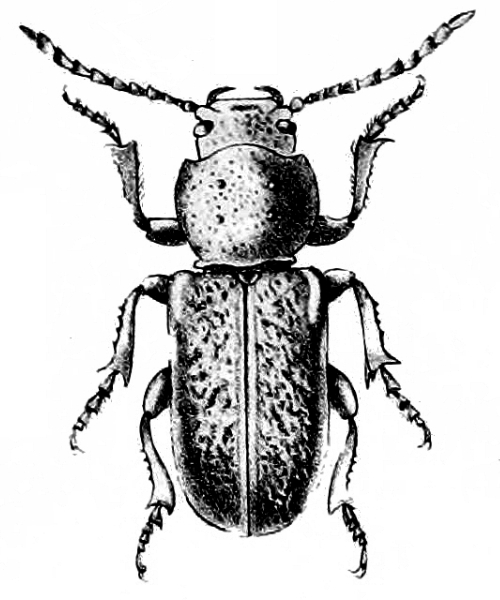
- Migdolus fryanus

Scientific classification
- Kingdom: Animalia
- Phylum: Arthropoda
- Clade: Pancrustacea
- Class: Insecta
- Order: Coleoptera
- Suborder: Polyphaga
- Infraorder: Cucujiformia
- Family: Vesperidae
- Subfamily: Anoplodermatinae; Guérin-Méneville, 1840

= Anoplodermatinae =

Subfamily of beetles

Anoplodermatinae is a subfamily of beetles in the family Cerambycidae. It was first described by Guérin-Méneville in 1840. There are currently 27 accepted species split between 3 genera.

== Genera and species ==
Tribe: Anoplodermatini

Anoplodermatini has 19 accepted species split between 6 genera.

- Acanthomigdolus
  - Acanthomigdolus quadricollis
- Anoploderma
  - Anoploderma bicolor
  - Anoploderma breueri
  - Anoploderma peruvianum
- Cherrocrius
  - Cherrocrius bruchi
- Migdolus
  - Migdolus brachypterus
  - Migdolus clypeatus
  - Migdolus cuyabanus
  - Migdolus exul
  - Migdolus fryanus
  - Migdolus goyanus
  - Migdolus morretesi
  - Migdolus punctatus
  - Migdolus spitzi
  - Migdolus thulanus
- Paramigdolus
  - Paramigdolus tetropioides
- Sypilus
  - Spilus atractomorphus
  - Spilus candezei
  - Spilus guyanensis
  - Spilus longicornis
  - Spilus mitarakaensis
  - Spilus nigriceps
  - Spilus nitidus
  - Spilus rourensis
  - Spilus rubidus
  - Spilus rubriceps
  - Spilus saulensis
  - Spilus serraticornis
  - Sypilus boeroi
  - Sypilus ferrugineus
  - Sypilus orbignyi

Tribe: Hypocephalini

The tribe Hypocephalini has one accepted species, which is in the genus Hypocephalus.

- Hypocephalus
  - Hypocephalus armatus

Tribe: Mysteriini'

The tribe Mysteriini has 7 accepted species split between 3 genera.

- Mysteria
  - Mysteria cylindripennis
  - Mysteria darwini
  - Mysteria lacordairei
  - Mysteria minuta
  - Mysteria seabrai
- Pathocerus
  - Pathocerus wagneri
- Pseudopathocerus
  - Pseudopathocerus humboldti
