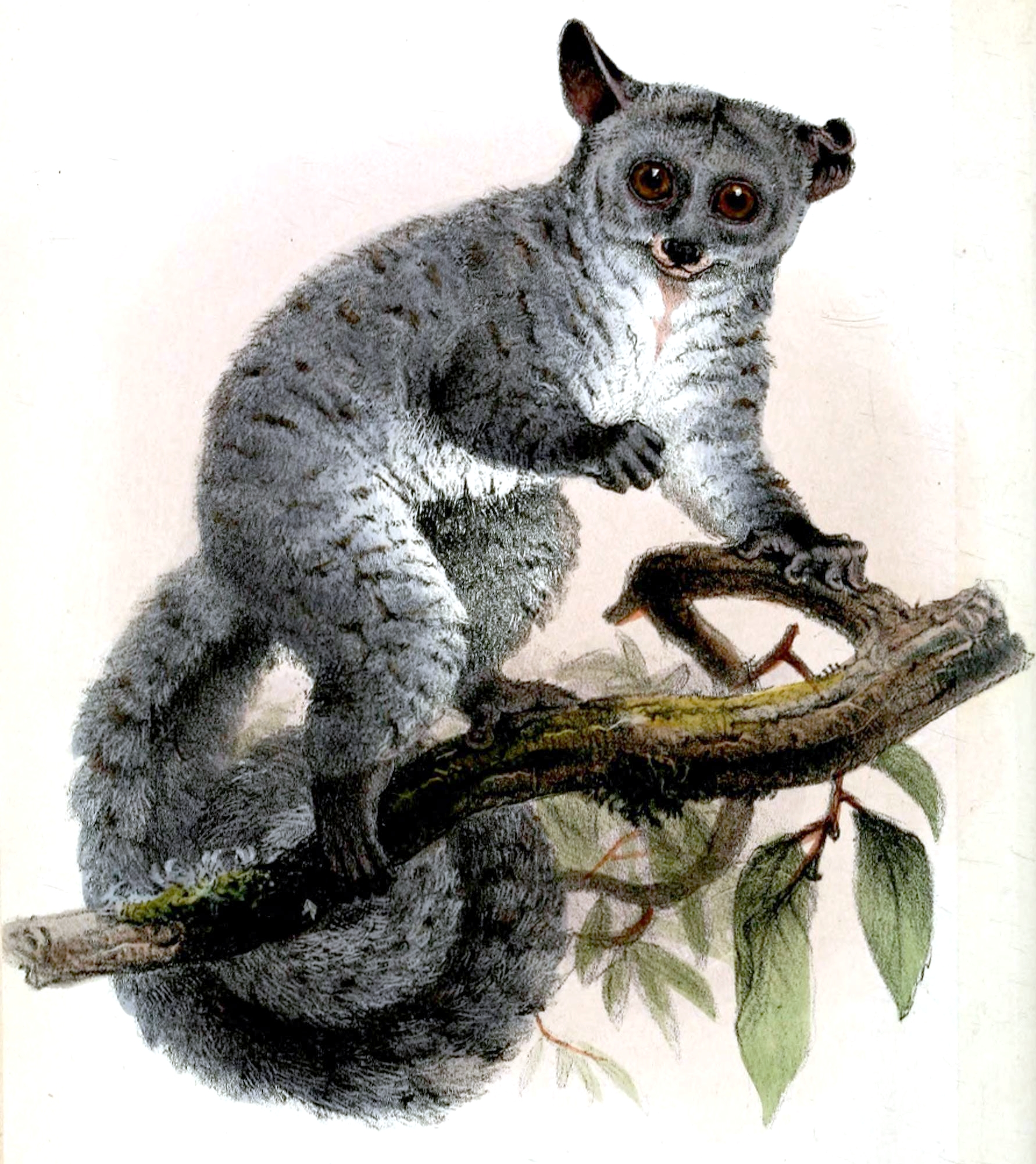

Conservation status
- Least Concern (IUCN 3.1)

Scientific classification
- Kingdom: Animalia
- Phylum: Chordata
- Class: Mammalia
- Infraclass: Placentalia
- Order: Primates
- Suborder: Strepsirrhini
- Family: Galagidae
- Genus: Otolemur
- Species: O. crassicaudatus
- Subspecies: O. c. monteiri

Trinomial name
- Otolemur crassicaudatus monteiri Bartlett, 1863

= Silvery greater galago =

Species of primate

The silvery greater galago (Otolemur crassicaudatus monteiri) is a nocturnal primate from the galago family. It is usually found in Brachystegia woodland, from Angola to Tanzania, western Kenya and Rwanda.

The species was separated from the brown greater galago by Colin Groves in 2001, including O. m. argentatus as a subspecies, but both the IUCN and the American Society of Mammalogists retain it as a subspecies.
