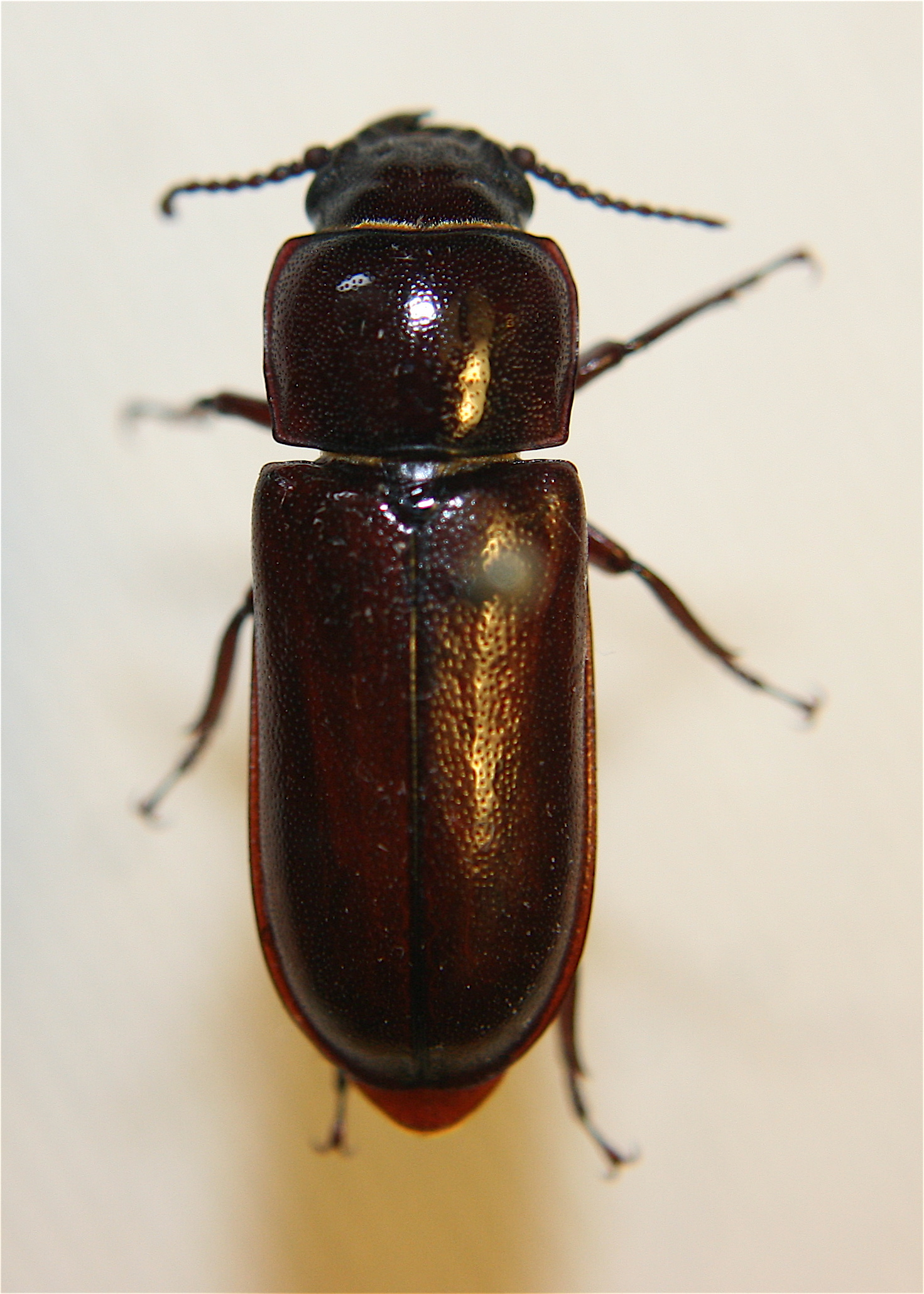
- Pinned specimen

Scientific classification
- Kingdom: Animalia
- Phylum: Arthropoda
- Clade: Pancrustacea
- Class: Insecta
- Order: Coleoptera
- Suborder: Polyphaga
- Infraorder: Cucujiformia
- Family: Cerambycidae
- Genus: Neandra
- Species: N. brunnea

Binomial name
- Neandra brunnea (Fabricius, 1798)

Synonyms
- Parandra brunnea (Fabricius, 1798); Tenebrio brunneus Fabricius, 1798

= Neandra brunnea =

Species of longhorn beetle

Neandra brunnea, the pole borer, is a species of the longhorn beetle family, subfamily Parandrinae. The longhorn beetle grows between 8 and 20 mm (0.79 in) and is yellowish-brown or reddish-brown in colour with relatively short, serrate antennae. Its range includes the entire eastern portion of North America. It can be seen between March and November.
