= Auxa =

Scientific classification
- Domain: Eukaryota
- Kingdom: Animalia
- Phylum: Arthropoda
- Class: Insecta
- Order: Coleoptera
- Suborder: Polyphaga
- Infraorder: Cucujiformia
- Family: Cerambycidae
- Tribe: Apomecynini
- Genus: Auxa; Pascoe, 1860

Genus of beetles

Auxa is a genus of beetles in the family Cerambycidae, containing the following species:

- Auxa armata (Coquerel, 1851)
- Auxa basirufipennis Breuning, 1980
- Auxa bimaculipennis Breuning, 1957
- Auxa divaricata (Coquerel, 1851)
- Auxa dorsata (Fairmaire, 1902)
- Auxa fuscolineata Breuning, 1957
- Auxa gibbicollis Fairmaire, 1902
- Auxa griveaudi Breuning, 1980
- Auxa lineolata Fairmaire, 1897
- Auxa longidens Breuning, 1957
- Auxa mediofasciata Breuning, 1940
- Auxa mimodivaricata Breuning, 1980
- Auxa nigritarsis Breuning, 1957
- Auxa obliquata Breuning, 1939
- Auxa paragibbicollis Breuning, 1975
- Auxa parvidens Fairmaire, 1897
- Auxa pauliani Breuning, 1957
- Auxa perroti Breuning, 1957
- Auxa pulchra Breuning, 1966
- Auxa rufoflava Breuning, 1970
- Auxa scriptidorsis Fairmaire, 1897
- Auxa sericea Breuning, 1957
- Auxa subdivaricata Breuning, 1957
- Auxa subobliquata Breuning, 1957
- Auxa subtruncata Breuning, 1966
- Auxa unicolor Breuning, 1940
- Auxa vadoni Breuning, 1957
