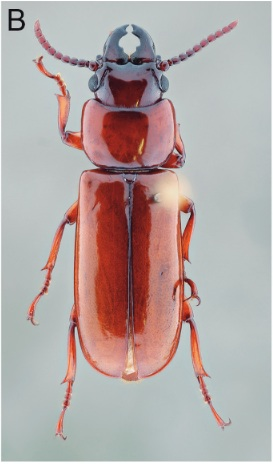

Scientific classification
- Kingdom: Animalia
- Phylum: Arthropoda
- Clade: Pancrustacea
- Class: Insecta
- Order: Coleoptera
- Suborder: Polyphaga
- Infraorder: Cucujiformia
- Family: Cerambycidae
- Genus: Parandra
- Species: P. glabra

Binomial name
- Parandra glabra (Degeer, 1774)

Synonyms
- Attelabus glaber De Geer, 1774; Scarites testaceus Fabricius, 1794; Parandra laevis Latreille, 1804; Parandra ferruginea Sturm, 1826; Parandra lineola Gory, 1831; Parandra mandibularis Perty, 1832; Parandra maxillosa Laporte, 1840; Parandra columbica Thomson, 1861; Parandra grandis Thomson, 1861; Parandra barbata Thomson, 1861; Parandra occipitalis Thomson, 1867; Parandra obsolescens Casey, 1912; Parandra (Archandra) glabra var. translucida Zikán, 1948; Parandra (Arachandra) lucida Zián, 1948

= Parandra glabra =

Species of beetle

Parandra glabra is a species of beetle of the family Cerambycidae. It is broadly distributed in the Neotropical region.
