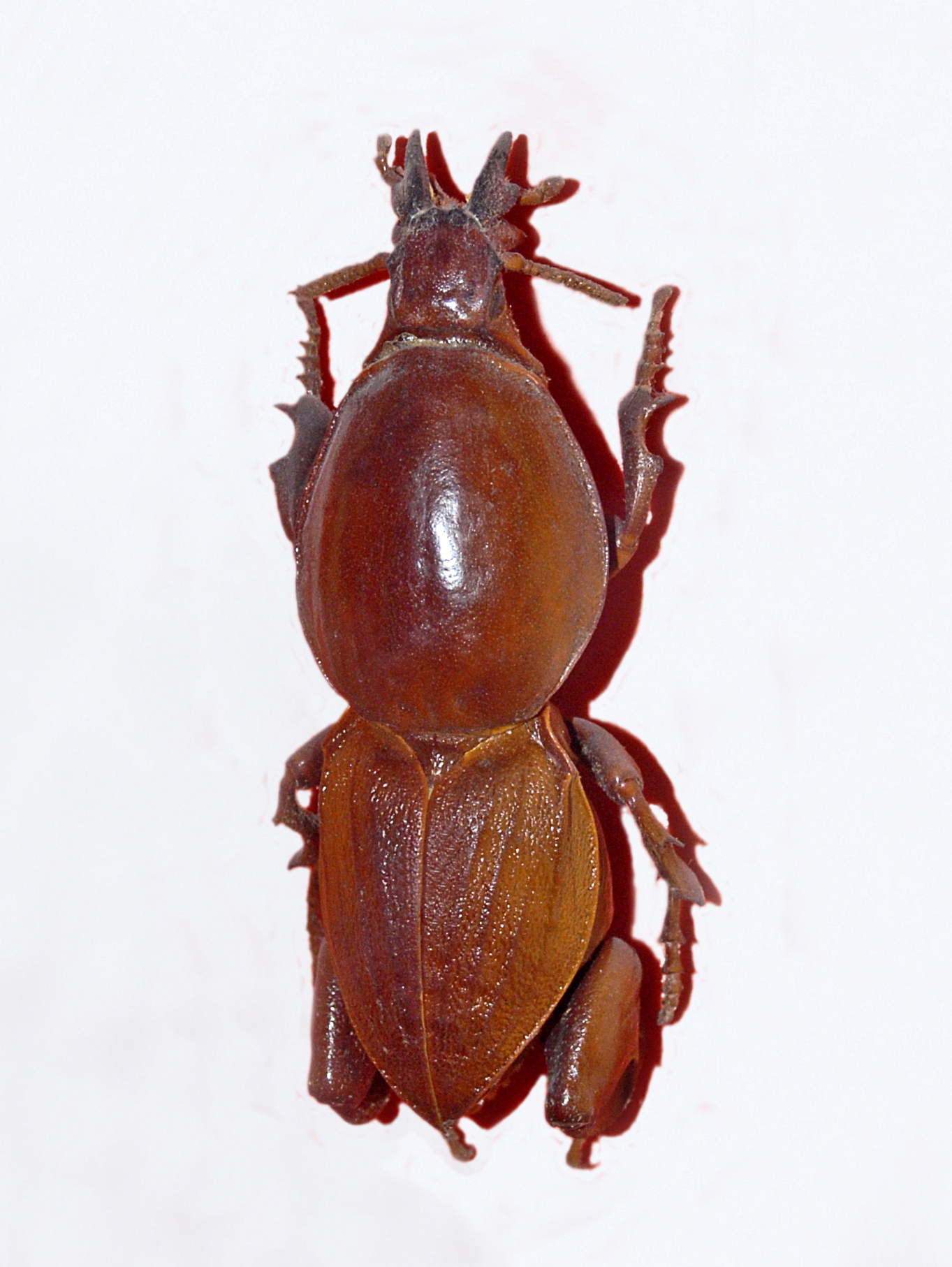
- Museum specimen of Hypocephalus armatus

Scientific classification
- Kingdom: Animalia
- Phylum: Arthropoda
- Clade: Pancrustacea
- Class: Insecta
- Order: Coleoptera
- Suborder: Polyphaga
- Infraorder: Cucujiformia
- Family: Vesperidae
- Subfamily: Anoplodermatinae
- Tribe: Hypocephalini
- Genus: Hypocephalus; Desmarest, 1832
- Species: H. armatus

Binomial name
- Hypocephalus armatus Desmarest, 1832

Synonyms
- Mesoclastus paradoxus Gistel, 1837

= Hypocephalus armatus =

Genus and species of beetle

Hypocephalus armatus, the mole beetle, is a species of beetle in the family Vesperidae. It is the only species in the genus Hypocephalus. Both the genus and species were first described by Anselme Gaëtan Desmarest in 1832. It is found in Brazil and is popular in museums and collections for its curiosity value and adaptations to digging in soil that make them appear outwardly similar to the mole crickets.

== Description ==
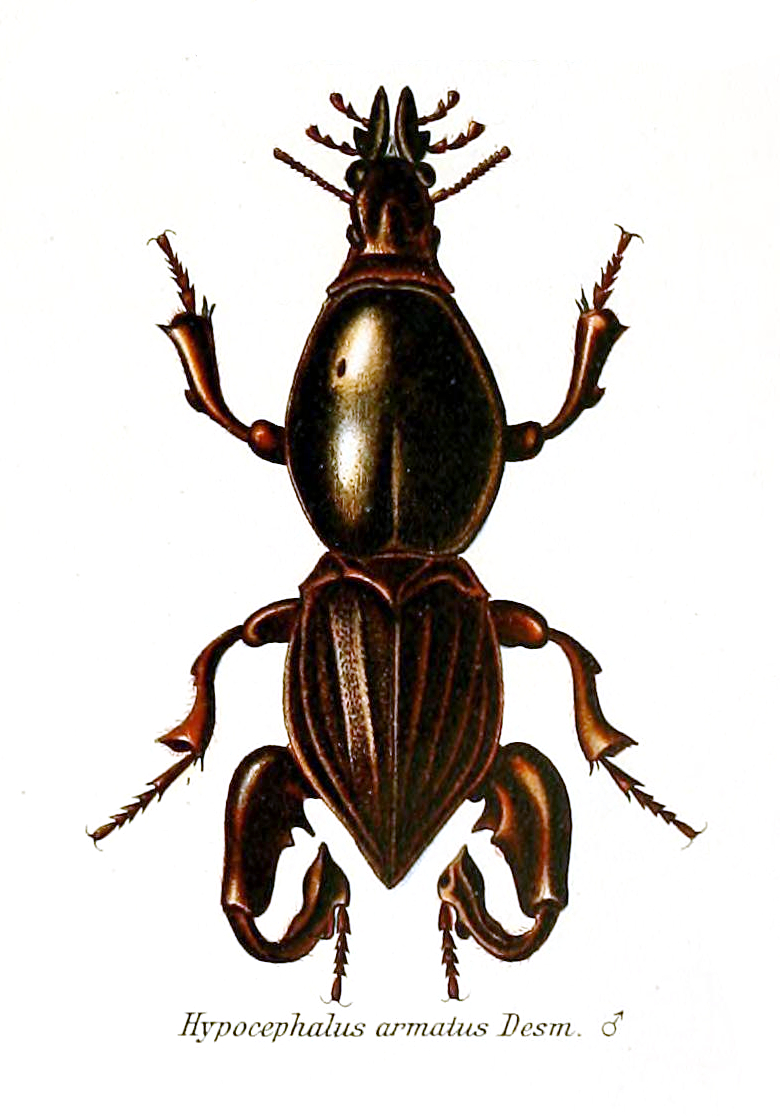

Hypocephalus armatus can reach a body length of about 45–58 millimetres (1.8–2.3 in). This rare species has an evident sexual dimorphism, as the very strong legs of the males are more developed than in females. It is similar in appearance to a mole cricket through convergent evolution. In both sexes the flight wings are absent, the prothorax is ovoid and shiny black, the dark brown elytra are fused together and the hind legs are much heavier than the others and adapted for digging. Adult males can be found from November to March, usually after the rains, when they dig into the soil.

The exceptional adaptations and taxonomic features have puzzled taxonomists since its description in 1832. It has been placed in the past in a family of its own, Hypocephalidae, followed by placement within the Cerambycidae. It is now placed within the family Vesperidae although molecular studies have not confirmed its placement.

== Distribution ==
This species is found in Brazil, in the north of Minas Gerais and southern Bahia. It has a fossorial habit and lives in underground galleries.
