= Acutandra =

Scientific classification
- Kingdom: Animalia
- Phylum: Arthropoda
- Class: Insecta
- Order: Coleoptera
- Suborder: Polyphaga
- Infraorder: Cucujiformia
- Family: Cerambycidae
- Subfamily: Parandrinae
- Tribe: Parandrini
- Genus: Acutandra; Santos-Silva, 2002

Type species
- Acutandra punctatissima (Thomson, 1861)

Genus of beetles

Acutandra is a genus of Long-Horned Beetles in the beetle family Cerambycidae. There are more than 20 described species in Acutandra. They are found in Africa and the Neotropics

== Species ==
These 28 species belong to the genus Acutandra:

- Acutandra amieti Bouyer, Drumont & Santos-Silva, 2012 (DR Congo)
- Acutandra araucana (Bosq, 1951) (Argentina and Chile)
- Acutandra barclayi Bouyer, Drumont & Santos-Silva, 2012 (São Tomé and Príncipe)
- Acutandra beninensis (Murray, 1862) (Nigeria)
- Acutandra camiadei Bouyer, Drumont & Santos-Silva, 2012 (Equatorial Guinea)
- Acutandra caterinoi Lingafelter & Tishechkin, 2017 (Ecuador)
- Acutandra comoriana (Fairmaire, 1895) (Comoros)
- Acutandra conradti (Kolbe, 1893) (Tanzania)
- Acutandra dasilvai Bouyer, Drumont & Santos-Silva, 2012 (São Tomé and Príncipe)
- Acutandra degeerii (Thomson, 1867) (Brazil)
- Acutandra delahayei Bouyer, Drumont & Santos-Silva, 2012 (São Tomé and Príncipe)
- Acutandra gabonica (Thomson, 1858) (Africa)
- Acutandra gaetani Bouyer, Drumont & Santos-Silva, 2012 (Burundi, Cameroon, and Equatorial Guinea)
- Acutandra garnieri Bouyer, Drumont & Santos-Silva, 2012 (Cameroon)
- Acutandra grobbelaarae Bouyer, Drumont & Santos-Silva, 2012 (Ivory Coast)
- Acutandra hugoi Bouyer, Drumont & Santos-Silva, 2012 (DR Congo)
- Acutandra jolyi Bouyer, Drumont & Santos-Silva, 2012 (Ivory Coast and Ghana)
- Acutandra leduci Bouyer, Drumont & Santos-Silva, 2012 (Tanzania)
- Acutandra leonardi Bouyer, Drumont & Santos-Silva, 2012 (Kenya)
- Acutandra lucasi Bouyer, Drumont & Santos-Silva, 2012 (DR Congo)
- Acutandra murrayi (Lameere, 1912) (Brazil)
- Acutandra noellae Bouyer, Drumont & Santos-Silva, 2012 (Gabon)
- Acutandra oremansi Bouyer, Drumont & Santos-Silva, 2012 (São Tomé and Príncipe)
- Acutandra plenevauxae Bouyer, Drumont & Santos-Silva, 2012 (Uganda, Central African Republic, DR Congo)
- Acutandra punctatissima (Thomson, 1861) (Brazil and French Guiana)
- Acutandra quentini Bouyer, Drumont & Santos-Silva, 2012 (Kenya)
- Acutandra ubitiara (Santos-Silva & Martins, 2000) (Colombia and Costa Rica)
- Acutandra vingerhoedti Bouyer, Drumont & Santos-Silva, 2012 (Burundi and Rwanda)
