= Auxa bimaculipennis =

Scientific classification
- Kingdom: Animalia
- Phylum: Arthropoda
- Clade: Pancrustacea
- Class: Insecta
- Order: Coleoptera
- Suborder: Polyphaga
- Infraorder: Cucujiformia
- Family: Cerambycidae
- Genus: Auxa
- Species: A. bimaculipennis

Binomial name
- Auxa bimaculipennis Breuning, 1957

Species of beetle

Auxa bimaculipennis is a species of longhorn beetle in the subfamily Lamiinae. It was described by Breuning in 1957 and is endemic to Madagascar.
