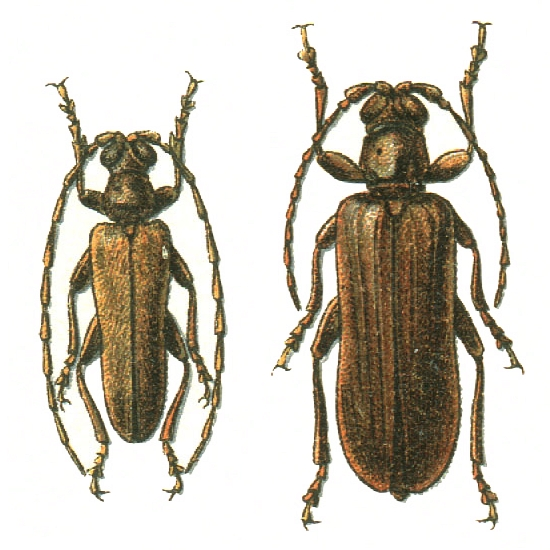
- Philus antennatus

Scientific classification
- Kingdom: Animalia
- Phylum: Arthropoda
- Clade: Pancrustacea
- Class: Insecta
- Order: Coleoptera
- Suborder: Polyphaga
- Infraorder: Cucujiformia
- Family: Cerambycidae
- Genus: Philinae; Thomson, 1860

= Philinae =

Subfamily of beetles

Philinae is a subfamily of beetles in the family Cerambycidae. It was first described by J.Thomson in 1860. It consists of 20 accepted species within one tribe, and 5 genera.

== Genera and species ==
Tribe: Philini

- Genus: Doesus
  - Doesus taprobanicus
  - Doesus telephoroides
- Genus: Heterophilus
  - Heterophilus dentitibialis
  - Heterophilus punctulatus
  - Heterphilus scabricollis
- Genus: Mantitheus
  - Mantitheus acuminatus
  - Mantitheus murzini
  - Mantitheus pekinensis
  - Mantitheus taiguensis
- Genus: Philus
  - Philus antennatus
  - Philus costatus
  - Philus curticollis
  - Philus globulicollis
  - Philus longipennis
  - Philus lumawigi
  - Philus ophthalmicus
  - Philus pallescens
  - Philus rufescens
- Genus: Spiniphilus
  - Spiniphilus spinicornis
  - Spiniphilus xiaodongi
