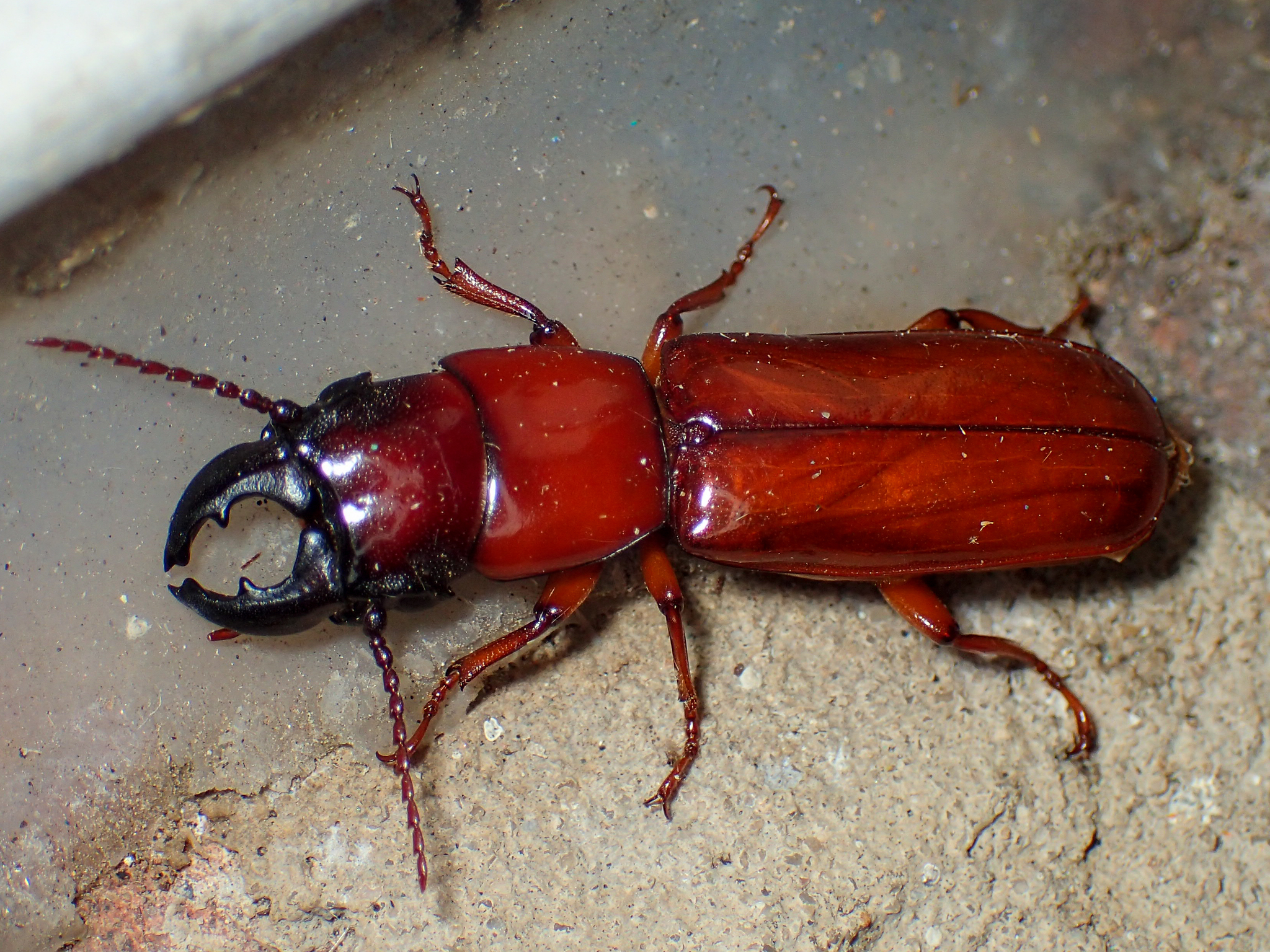
- Parandra polita, Alabama

Scientific classification
- Kingdom: Animalia
- Phylum: Arthropoda
- Class: Insecta
- Order: Coleoptera
- Suborder: Polyphaga
- Infraorder: Cucujiformia
- Family: Cerambycidae
- Subfamily: Parandrinae
- Genus: Parandra; Latreille, 1802

= Parandra =

Genus of beetles

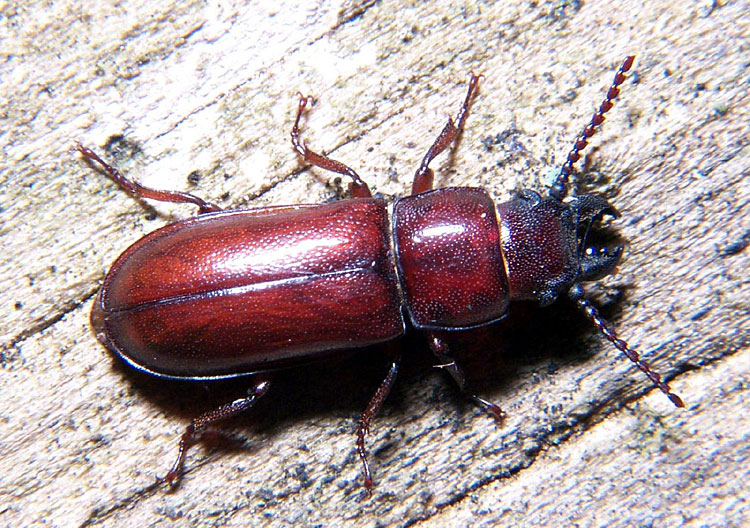
Parandra brunnea, Illinois

Parandra is a genus in the longhorn beetle family Cerambycidae. There are more than 20 described species in Parandra.

== Species ==
These 28 species belong to the genus Parandra:

- Parandra barclayi Santos-Silva, 2015 (Peru)
- Parandra brachyderes Lameere, 1902 (Mexico)
- Parandra brasilica Zikán, 1948 (Brazil)
- Parandra brevicollis Lameere, 1902 (Ecuador)
- Parandra colombica White, 1853 (Central and South America)
- Parandra conspicua Tippmann, 1960 (Bolivia and Ecuador)
- Parandra expectata Lameere, 1902 (Argentina, Brazil, Paraguay, and Uruguay)
- Parandra gilloglyi Santos-Silva & Lezama, 2010 (Ecuador and Panama)
- Parandra glaberrima Zikán, 1948 (Brazil)
- Parandra glabra (Degeer, 1774) (Central America, South America, India)
- Parandra guianensis (Tavakilian, 2000) (French Guiana)
- Parandra humboldti (Santos-Silva, 2003) (Colombia, Ecuador, and Peru)
- Parandra imitatrix (Santos-Silva, 2005) (Brazil)
- Parandra lalannecassouorum (Tavakilian, 2000) (French Guiana)
- Parandra letiranti Santos-Silva & Vigneault, 2022 (Peru)
- Parandra longicollis Thomson, 1861 (Mexico, Central America, South America)
- Parandra minuscula Zikán, 1948 (Brazil)
- Parandra monnei (Santos-Silva, 2001) (Brazil)
- Parandra polita Say, 1835 (North, Central, and South America)
- Parandra santossilvai Lingafelter & Tishechkin, 2017 (Bolivia)
- Parandra scaritoides Thomson, 1861 (Colombia)
- Parandra separanda Zikán, 1948 (Brazil and Paraguay)
- Parandra solangeae (Santos-Silva, 2003) (Colombia and Venezuela)
- Parandra solisi (Santos-Silva, 2007) (Costa Rica and Panama)
- Parandra thomasi (Santos-Silva, 2002) (Bolivia)
- Parandra tucumana Zikán, 1948 (Argentina and Uruguay)
- Parandra ubirajarai (Santos-Silva, 2001) (Brazil)
- Parandra villei Lameere, 1885 (South America)
