= Adlbauerandra =

Scientific classification
- Domain: Eukaryota
- Kingdom: Animalia
- Phylum: Arthropoda
- Class: Insecta
- Order: Coleoptera
- Suborder: Polyphaga
- Infraorder: Cucujiformia
- Family: Cerambycidae
- Tribe: Parandrini
- Genus: Adlbauerandra; Bouyer, Drumont & Santos-Silva, 2012
- Species: A. morettoi

Binomial name
- Adlbauerandra morettoi (Adlbauer, 2004)

Genus of beetles

Adlbauerandra is a genus of Long-Horned Beetles in the beetle family Cerambycidae. This genus has a single species, Adlbauerandra morettoi. It is found in Cameroon and the Central African Republic.
