= Archandra =

Scientific classification
- Domain: Eukaryota
- Kingdom: Animalia
- Phylum: Arthropoda
- Class: Insecta
- Order: Coleoptera
- Suborder: Polyphaga
- Infraorder: Cucujiformia
- Family: Cerambycidae
- Tribe: Parandrini
- Genus: Archandra; Lameere, 1912
- Species: A. caspia

Binomial name
- Archandra caspia (Ménétriés, 1832)

Genus of beetles

Archandra is a genus of Long-Horned Beetles in the beetle family Cerambycidae. This genus has a single species, Archandra caspia. It is found in western Asia, and has been recorded in Armenia, Azerbaijan, Russia, Iran, and Turkmenistan.
