= Massangena =

Coordinates: 21°32′16″S 32°57′23″E

Massangena is a river town in Massangena District of Gaza Province in south-western Mozambique. It lies on the river Save River (Africa).

== History ==
Between 1740 and 1775 there were many attempts by the Portuguese to explore inland by way of travelling up the Save River. The farthest any of these missions got was Massangena. Seven attempts were made to go further in the 1750s and 1760s, and one attempt was made in 1775. All eight of these missions met with disaster. The first mission failed when the many members of the expedition came down with malaria. The second mission stumbled upon numerous hippopotami and many members of the expedition were killed or wounded by the startled animals. The third suffered a similar fate, however, it was crocodiles that befell them. The forth mission failed when torrential downpours in December made travel impossible. The fifth mission, as with the first, failed on account of a severe outbreak of malaria. The fifth expedition, led by Portuguese explorers Manuel Gomes and Agostinho Cabeçadas suffered from a leopard attack in which both of the aforementioned explorers, who were the leaders of the expedition were mauled by the same leopard a few miles northwest of Massangena. The sixth expedition was destroyed when their camp was overrun by an elephant and expedition leader João da Madalena was trampled to death, also a few miles northwest of Massangena. The sixth and seventh expeditions were attacked by the armed bands of the Tsonga people and were forced to turn back. And the eighth expedition was struck by a series of disasters, the first of which involving an incident with a Mozambique spitting cobra which rendered the leader of the expedition temporarily blind and one of the bearers severely wounded, and another involving several bearers being killed and wounded by a hippopotamus, also several miles northwest of Massangena. For this reason the area to northwest of Massangena, which is roughly today's Masvingo Province of Zimbabwe, was labelled as "desconhecida" and/or "inexplorada" on Portuguese maps by the late 1770s and early 1780s.
