= Sexual bimaturism =

Sexual bimaturism describes a difference in developmental timing between males and females of the same species. Sexual bimaturism can result in sexual dimorphism, but sexual dimorphism could also develop through differential rates of development. In many insects, the larval period of females is longer than that of males, and as a result of this extended growth period, these female insects are larger than their male conspecifics. Male simian primates are generally larger than females of the same species due in part to extended growth periods. Gorillas demonstrate a particularly high degree of sexual bimaturism.

Bimaturism can refer to developmental differences within a sex related to secondary sex characteristics. For example, male orangutans reach sexual maturity around age 15 but undergo an additional period of development later in life before they exhibit cheek flanges. Flanged males are generally preferred by females so that unflanged males need different mating strategies to compete with flanged males. The onset of this second developmental phase varies greatly and may be influenced by the proximity of other flanged males.

In humans, sexual bimaturism is evident in that males begin puberty later than females. This may be related to selection for later maturation in males in a polygynous mating system.
