= Charles Coquerel =

French navy surgeon, algologist and entomologist

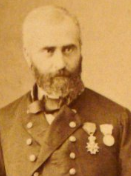
Charles Coquerel

Jean Charles Coquerel (2 December 1822 – 12 April 1867) was a French navy surgeon, algologist, and entomologist.

Coquerel collected insects in Madagascar and neighbouring islands. A number of these were described after his death by Léon Fairmaire in his Notes sur les Coléopteres recueillis par Charles Coquerel a Madagascar et sur les côtes d'Afrique (1869). During his lifetime Coquerel wrote a number of articles and books, including an appendix on insects in Auguste Vinson's Voyage à Madagascar au couronnement de Radama II (1865).

A number of animals are named after him, including the Coquerel's coua (Coua coquereli Grandidier, 1867), the Coquerel's sifaka (Propithecus coquereli Milne-Edwards, 1867), and the Coquerel's giant mouse lemur (Mirza coquereli Grandidier, 1867). Each of these species is endemic to Madagascar.

Coquerel's insect collection is in the Muséum national d'histoire naturelle in Paris.
