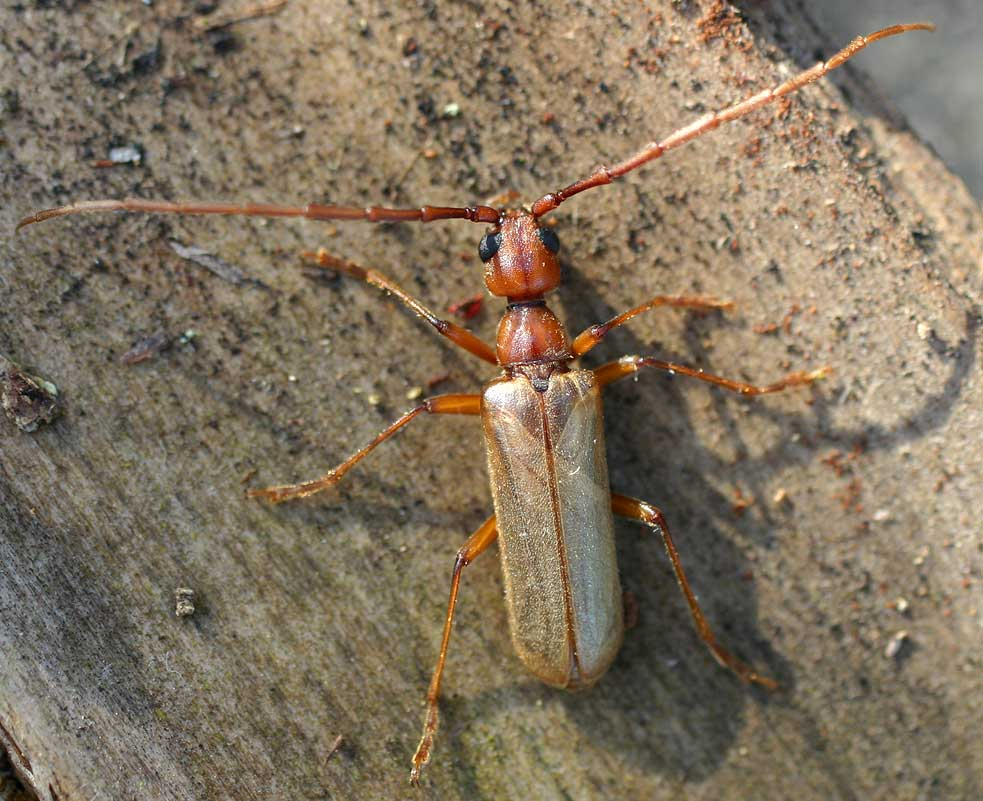
- Vesperus strepens

Scientific classification
- Kingdom: Animalia
- Phylum: Arthropoda
- Clade: Pancrustacea
- Class: Insecta
- Order: Coleoptera
- Suborder: Polyphaga
- Infraorder: Cucujiformia
- Superfamily: Chrysomeloidea
- Family: Vesperidae; Mulsant, 1839

Subfamilies
- Anoplodermatinae; Philinae; Vesperinae

= Vesperidae =

Family of beetles

The Vesperidae are a small family of beetles, normally classified within the family Cerambycidae, of heterogeneous aspect but all characterised by larval stages related to roots of herbaceous plants or trees

== Morphology ==
=== Adult ===
The nocturnal adults are characterised by earthy brown-testaceous colours, brachypterous wings or apterous (especially in females) and physogastry in females. Some tropical genera (Pathocerus) have comb-like antennae, some other (Hypocephalus) extremely reduced antennae. Some genera, such as the Brazilian Migdolus have well-developed mandibles, such as the males of the cerambycids Parandra and Spondylis, while others, such as the males of the genus Hypocephalus, have extremely modified mandibles.

=== Larva ===
The larvae have evolved some adaptations to subterranean life. In particular, the Mediterranean genus Vesperus have larvae characterised by a peculiar larval hypermetamorphosis. The larvae I have a normal worm-like aspect (though characterised by abnormally long setae), while those of following stadia have a C-shaped aspect, which makes them similar to the larvae of Melolonthinae.

== Systematics ==
The family includes 3 subfamilies:

- Anoplodermatinae Guérin-Méneville, 1840
- Philinae J.Thomson, 1860
- Vesperinae Mulsant, 1839

In the past, the Vesperini has been placed within Lepturinae, the Anoplodermatini within Prioninae and the Philini a mysterious group related to the Prioninae. Some peculiar larval characteristics of Vesperus has prompted some authorities to separate them as a subfamily and later as a distinct family.
In 1997 Švácha, Wang & Chen recognised the morphological similarities among these three groups in the larval stadia. More recently, analyses on chromosomes has also evidenced strong differences with respect to Cerambycidae.
