= List of lorisoids =

Species in mammal superfamily Lorisoidea

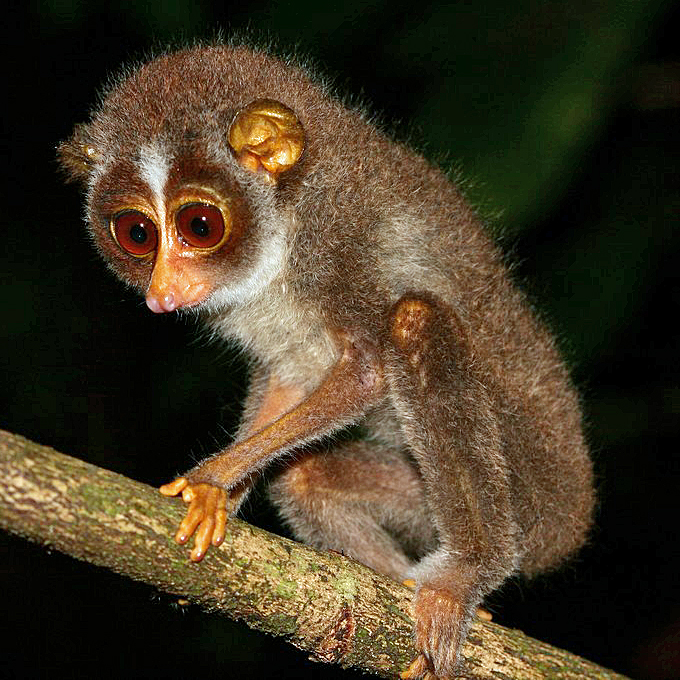
Red slender loris (Loris tardigradus)

Lorisoidea is a superfamily of nocturnal primates. Members of this superfamily are called lorisoids, and include lorises, angwantibos, pottos, galagos, and bushbabies. Lorisoidea is one of two superfamilies that form the suborder Strepsirrhini, itself one of two suborders in the order Primates. They are found in Asia and Africa, generally in forests, though some species can be found in shrublands and savannas. They range in size from the Prince Demidoff's bushbaby, at 10 cm (4 in) plus a 15 cm (6 in) tail, to the West African potto, at 39 cm (15 in) plus a 10 cm (4 in) tail. Lorisoids primarily eat fruit, insects, and tree gums and resins. Most lorisoids do not have population estimates, but the ones that do range from 40 mature individuals to 500,000. Six species are categorized as endangered: the Bengal, pygmy, Sumatran, and Sunda slow lorises, the red slender loris, and the Rondo dwarf galago. A further two species are categorized as critically endangered: the Bangka slow loris and the Javan slow loris.

The thirty-five extant species of Lorisoidea are divided into two families: Galagidae, containing nineteen bushbaby and galago species divided between six genera, and Lorisidae, containing sixteen species divided between the three genera in the loris subfamily Lorisinae and the two genera of the angwantibo and potto subfamily Perodicticinae. Several extinct prehistoric lorisoid species have been discovered, though due to ongoing research and discoveries the exact number and categorization is not fixed.

== Conventions ==
IUCN Red List categories
Conservation status
- EX: Extinct (0 species)
- EW: Extinct in the wild (0 species)
- CR: Critically endangered (2 species)
- EN: Endangered (6 species)
- VU: Vulnerable (4 species)
- NT: Near threatened (7 species)
- LC: Least concern (15 species)

Other categories
- DD: Data deficient (1 species)
- NE: Not evaluated (0 species)

The author citation for the species or genus is given after the scientific name; parentheses around the author citation indicate that this was not the original taxonomic placement. Conservation status codes listed follow the International Union for Conservation of Nature (IUCN) Red List of Threatened Species. Range maps are provided wherever possible; if a range map is not available, a description of the lorisoid's range is provided. Ranges are based on the IUCN Red List for that species unless otherwise noted. All extinct genera, species, or subspecies listed alongside extant species went extinct after 1500 CE, and are indicated by a dagger symbol "†".

== Classification ==
The superfamily Lorisoidea consists of two extant families: Galagidae and Lorisidae. Galagidae contains nineteen species in six genera, while Lorisidae is divided into two subfamilies: Lorisinae, containing eleven species divided between three genera, and Perodicticinae, containing five species divided between two genera.

Family Galagidae

- Genus Euoticus (needle-clawed bushbabies): two species
- Genus Galago (lesser bushbabies): four species
- Genus Galagoides (western dwarf galagos): three species
- Genus Otolemur (greater galagos): two species
- Genus Paragalago (eastern dwarf galagos): five species
- Genus Sciurocheirus (squirrel galagos): three species

Family Lorisidae

- Subfamily Lorisinae
  - Genus Loris (slender lorises): two species
  - Genus Nycticebus (slow lorises): eight species
  - Genus Xanthonycticebus (pygmy slow loris): one species
- Subfamily Perodicticinae
  - Genus Arctocebus (angwantibos): two species
  - Genus Perodicticus (pottos): three species

- Lorisoidea
  - Galagidae
    - Euoticus
    - - Galagoides
      - - - Galago
          - Paragalago
        - - Otolemur
          - Sciurocheirus
  - Lorisidae
    - Lorisinae
      - Loris
      - - Nycticebus
        - Xanthonycticebus
    - Perodicticinae
      - Arctocebus
      - Perodicticus

== Lorisoids ==
The following classification is based on the taxonomy described by the reference work Mammal Species of the World (2005), with augmentation by generally accepted proposals made since using molecular phylogenetic analysis, as supported by both the IUCN and the American Society of Mammalogists.

=== Family Galagidae ===
Genus Euoticus – Gray, 1863 – two species
Common name	Scientific name and subspecies	Range	Size and ecology	IUCN status and estimated population
Northern needle-clawed bushbaby	E. pallidus (Gray, 1863) Two subspecies: E. p. pallidus (Bioko needle-clawed bushbaby); E. p. talboti (Nigeria needle-clawed bushbaby)	Western equatorial Africa	Size: 18–33 cm (7–13 in) long, plus 28–31 cm (11–12 in) tail Habitat: Forest Diet: Tree gums and resins	NT Unknown
Southern needle-clawed bushbaby	E. elegantulus (Conte, 1857)	Western equatorial Africa	Size: 21–24 cm (8–9 in) long, plus 28–32 cm (11–13 in) tail Habitat: Forest Diet: Tree and liana gums and resins, as well as invertebrates	LC Unknown

Genus Galago – É Geoffroy, 1796 – four species
Common name	Scientific name and subspecies	Range	Size and ecology	IUCN status and estimated population
Dusky bushbaby	G. matschiei Liburnau, 1917	Central Africa	Size: 14–19 cm (6–7 in) long, plus 24–28 cm (9–11 in) tail Habitat: Forest Diet: Insects, fruit, flowers, and gum	LC Unknown
Mohol bushbaby	G. moholi Smith, 1836	Central and southern Africa	Size: 14–17 cm (6–7 in) long, plus 11–28 cm (4–11 in) tail Habitat: Savanna Diet: Arthropods, as well as tree gum and resin	LC Unknown
Senegal bushbaby	G. senegalensis É Geoffroy, 1796 Four subspecies: G. s. braccatus (Kenya lesser bushbaby); G. s. dunni (Ethiopia lesser bushbaby); G. s. senegalensis (Senegal lesser bushbaby); G. s. sotikae (Uganda lesser bushbaby)	Equatorial Africa (possible additional range in red)	Size: 13–21 cm (5–8 in) long, plus 19–30 cm (7–12 in) tail Habitat: Forest and savanna Diet: Insects, as well as small birds, eggs, fruits, seeds, flowers, and tree gum	LC Unknown
Somali bushbaby	G. gallarum Thomas, 1901	Eastern Africa	Size: 13–20 cm (5–8 in) long, plus 20–30 cm (8–12 in) tail Habitat: Savanna Diet: Gum and invertebrates	LC Unknown

Genus Galagoides – A. Smith, 1833 – three species
Common name	Scientific name and subspecies	Range	Size and ecology	IUCN status and estimated population
Angolan dwarf galago	G. kumbirensis Svensson et al., 2017	Angola in southwestern Africa	Size: 14–18 cm (6–7 in) long, plus 17–21 cm (7–8 in) tail Habitat: Forest and shrubland Diet: Unknown	NT Unknown
Prince Demidoff's bushbaby	G. demidoff Fischer von Waldheim, 1806	Western and central equatorial Africa	Size: 10–13 cm (4–5 in) long, plus 15–21 cm (6–8 in) tail Habitat: Forest Diet: Insects, as well as fruit and gum	LC Unknown
Thomas's bushbaby	G. thomasi Elliot, 1907	Western and central equatorial Africa	Size: 12–17 cm (5–7 in) long, plus 15–24 cm (6–9 in) tail Habitat: Forest Diet: Insects, as well as small vertebrates, fruit, and tree buds, leaves, and gum	LC Unknown

Genus Otolemur – Coquerel, 1859 – two species
Common name	Scientific name and subspecies	Range	Size and ecology	IUCN status and estimated population
Brown greater galago	O. crassicaudatus É Geoffroy, 1812 Three subspecies: O. c. crassicaudatus (South African greater galago); O. c. kirkii (Tanganyika greater galago); O. c. monteiri (Silvery greater galago)	Southern Africa	Size: 29–38 cm (11–15 in) long, plus 41–48 cm (16–19 in) tail Habitat: Forest, savanna, and shrubland Diet: Gum and sap, as well as fruit and insects	LC Unknown
Northern greater galago	O. garnettii (Ogilby, 1838) Four subspecies: O. g. garnettii (Zanzibar greater galago); O. g. kikuyuensis (Kikuyu greater galago); O. g. lasiotis (White-tailed greater galago); O. g. panganiensis (Pangani greater galago)	Eastern Africa	Size: 23–34 cm (9–13 in) long, plus about 36 cm (14 in) tail Habitat: Forest Diet: Fruit and insects	LC Unknown

Genus Paragalago – Masters, Génin, Couette, Groves, Nash, Delpero, Pozzi, 2017 – five species
Common name	Scientific name and subspecies	Range	Size and ecology	IUCN status and estimated population
Grant's bushbaby	P. granti (Thomas & Wroughton, 1907)	Southeastern Africa	Size: 14–19 cm (6–7 in) long, plus 20–27 cm (8–11 in) tail Habitat: Forest Diet: Invertebrates, fruit, gum, and flowers, as well as small birds	LC Unknown
Kenya coast galago	P. cocos Heller, 1912	Southeastern Africa	Size: 14–19 cm (6–7 in) long, plus 18–23 cm (7–9 in) tail Habitat: Forest Diet: Insects and fruit	LC Unknown
Rondo dwarf galago	P. rondoensis Honess, 1997	Scattered Tanzania in southeastern Africa	Size: 10–13 cm (4–5 in) long, plus 17–18 cm (7 in) tail Habitat: Forest Diet: Insects, as well as fruit and gum	EN Unknown
Uluguru bushbaby	P. orinus Lawrence & Washburn, 1936	Southeastern Africa	Size: 12–14 cm (5–6 in) long, plus 16–20 cm (6–8 in) tail Habitat: Forest Diet: Gum, nectar, invertebrates, and small vertebrates	VU Unknown
Zanzibar bushbaby	P. zanzibaricus (Matschie, 1893) Two subspecies: P. z. udzungwensis (Udzungwa bushbaby); P. z. zanzibaricus (Zanzibar bushbaby)	Scattered Tanzania	Size: 14–15 cm (6–6 in) long, plus 12–15 cm (5–6 in) tail Habitat: Forest Diet: Fruit, insects, and gum	NT Unknown

Genus Sciurocheirus – Waterhouse, 1838 – three species
Common name	Scientific name and subspecies	Range	Size and ecology	IUCN status and estimated population
Bioko Allen's bushbaby	S. alleni (Waterhouse, 1838) Two subspecies: S. a. alleni (Bioko Allen's bushbaby); S. a. cameronensis (Cross River bushbaby)	Western equatorial Africa	Size: 15–24 cm (6–9 in) long, plus 20–30 cm (8–12 in) tail Habitat: Forest Diet: Fruit, as well as insects and small mammals	NT Unknown
Gabon bushbaby	S. gabonensis Gray, 1863	Western equatorial Africa	Size: 18–21 cm (7–8 in) long, plus 23–28 cm (9–11 in) tail Habitat: Forest Diet: Arthropods, insects, fruit, and gum	LC Unknown
Makandé squirrel galago	S. makandensis Ambrose, 2013	Gabon in western equatorial Africa	Size: Unknown Habitat: Forest Diet: Unknown	DD Unknown

=== Family Lorisidae ===
==== Subfamily Lorisinae ====
Genus Loris – É Geoffroy, 1796 – two species
Common name	Scientific name and subspecies	Range	Size and ecology	IUCN status and estimated population
Gray slender loris	L. lydekkerianus A. Cabrera, 1908 Four subspecies: L. l. grandis (Highland slender loris); L. l. lydekkerianus (Mysore slender loris); L. l. malabaricus (Malabar slender loris); L. l. nordicus (Northern Ceylonese slender loris)	Southern India and Sri Lanka	Size: 18–22 cm (7–9 in) long, with no tail Habitat: Forest Diet: Insects	NT Unknown
Red slender loris	L. tardigradus (Linnaeus, 1758)	Sri Lanka	Size: 18–26 cm (7–10 in) long, with no tail Habitat: Forest Diet: Insects, as well as tree frogs, geckos, small birds, eggs, and fruit	EN 2000–2300

Genus Nycticebus – É Geoffroy, 1812 – eight species
Common name	Scientific name and subspecies	Range	Size and ecology	IUCN status and estimated population
Bangka slow loris	N. bancanus (Lyon, 1906)	Borneo and Bangka Islands in southeastern Asia	Size: About 26 cm (10 in) long, with no tail Habitat: Forest Diet: Insects, gum, nectar, and fruit	CR Unknown
Bengal slow loris	N. bengalensis (Lacépède, 1800)	Southeastern Asia	Size: 26–38 cm (10–15 in) long, with vestigial tail Habitat: Forest Diet: Resin and gum, as well as nectar, fruit, invertebrates, bark, and bird eggs	EN Unknown
Bornean slow loris	N. borneanus (Lyon, 1906)	Borneo	Size: About 26 cm (10 in) long, with no tail Habitat: Forest Diet: Insects, gum, nectar, and fruit	VU Unknown
Javan slow loris	N. javanicus É Geoffroy, 1812	Java in southeastern Asia	Size: 28–31 cm (11–12 in) long, with vestigial tail Habitat: Forest Diet: Nectar, gum, insects, fruit, lizards, and eggs	CR Unknown
Kayan River slow loris	N. kayan Munds, Nekaris, Ford, 2013	Borneo	Size: About 27 cm (11 in) long, with no tail Habitat: Forest Diet: Unknown	VU Unknown
Philippine slow loris	N. menagensis Lydekker, 1893	Borneo and nearby islands	Size: About 27 cm (11 in) long, with no tail Habitat: Forest Diet: Insects, nectar, gum, and fruit	VU Unknown
Sumatran slow loris	N. hilleri (Stone and Rehn, 1902)	Sumatra in southeastern Asia	Size: 26–30 cm (10–12 in) long, with no tail Habitat: Forest Diet: Insects, nectar, gum, and fruit	EN Unknown
Sunda slow loris	N. coucang (Boddaert, 1785)	Southeastern Asia	Size: 27–38 cm (11–15 in) long, with no tail Habitat: Forest Diet: Sap, gum, nectar, stems, and fruit, as well as arthropods and insects	EN Unknown

Genus Xanthonycticebus – Nekaris & Nijman, 2022 – one species
Common name	Scientific name and subspecies	Range	Size and ecology	IUCN status and estimated population
Pygmy slow loris	X. pygmaeus (Bonhote, 1907)	Southeastern Asia	Size: 15–25 cm (6–10 in) long, with no tail Habitat: Forest Diet: Insects, gum, resin, fruit, and bamboo	EN Unknown

==== Subfamily Perodicticinae ====
Genus Arctocebus – Gray, 1863 – two species
Common name	Scientific name and subspecies	Range	Size and ecology	IUCN status and estimated population
Calabar angwantibo	A. calabarensis (Smith, 1860)	Western equatorial Africa	Size: 22–31 cm (9–12 in) long, plus 4–10 cm (2–4 in) tail Habitat: Forest Diet: Insects, as well as fruit and gum	NT Unknown
Golden angwantibo	A. aureus de Winton, 1902	Western equatorial Africa	Size: 22–26 cm (9–10 in) long, plus vestigial tail Habitat: Forest Diet: Insects and fruit	LC Unknown

Genus Perodicticus – Bennett, 1831 – three species
Common name	Scientific name and subspecies	Range	Size and ecology	IUCN status and estimated population
Central African potto	P. edwarsi Bouvier, 1879	Central Africa	Size: 30–37 cm (12–15 in) long, plus 3–7 cm (1–3 in) tail Habitat: Forest Diet: Gum, insects, snails and fruit	LC Unknown
East African potto	P. ibeanus Thomas, 1910 Two subspecies: P. i. ibeanus (Eastern potto); P. i. stockleyi (Mount Kenya potto)	East central Africa	Size: 29–37 cm (11–15 in) long, plus 4–10 cm (2–4 in) tail Habitat: Forest Diet: Fruit, gum, nectar, and invertebrates, as well as moss, frogs, and eggs	LC Unknown
West African potto	P. potto (Müller, 1766)	Western equatorial Africa	Size: 30–39 cm (12–15 in) long, plus 3–10 cm (1–4 in) tail Habitat: Forest Diet: Fruit, arthropods, insects, and eggs, as well as small vertebrates	NT Unknown

== Sources ==
- Groves, Colin P. (2005). Wilson, Don E.; Reeder, DeeAnn M. (eds.). Mammal Species of the World. Vol. 1 (3rd ed.). Johns Hopkins University Press. ISBN 978-0-8018-8221-0.
- Kingdon, Jonathan (2020). The Kingdon Pocket Guide to African Mammals (2nd ed.). Bloomsbury Publishing. ISBN 978-1-4729-8320-6.
- Kingdon, Jonathan; Happold, David; Butynski, Thomas; Hoffmann, Michael; Happold, Meredith; Kalina, Jan, eds. (2013). Mammals of Africa. Vol. 2. Bloomsbury Publishing. ISBN 978-1-4081-8996-2.
- Menon, Vivek (2023). Indian Mammals: A Field Guide (4th ed.). Hachette India. ISBN 978-93-93701-90-9.
- Nekaris, K. A. I.; Bearder, S. K. (2007). Campbell, C.; Fuentes, C.A.; MacKinnon, K.; Panger, M.; Stumpf, R. (eds.). Primates in Perspective. Oxford University Press. ISBN 978-0-19-517133-4.
- Stuart, Chris; Stuart, Mathilde (2017). Stuarts' Field Guide to the Larger Mammals of Africa (4th ed.). Penguin Random House South Africa. ISBN 978-1-77584-276-7.
- Supriatna, Jatna (2022). Field Guide to the Primates of Indonesia. Springer Nature. ISBN 978-3-03-083206-3.
