= List of primates of Africa =

This is a list of African type primates, containing all recent species of primates found in Africa including Madagascar. According to the IUCN/SSC Primate Specialist Group there are currently 216 species (111 in the mainland while the 105 are found in Madagascar). In addition the list also includes the recently extinct giant lemurs and humans (Homo sapiens) on the list. Each species is listed, with its binomial name.

== Strepsirrhini (É. Geoffroy, 1812) ==
=== Lorisiformes (Gregory, 1915) ===
==== Lorisoidea (Gray, 1821) ====
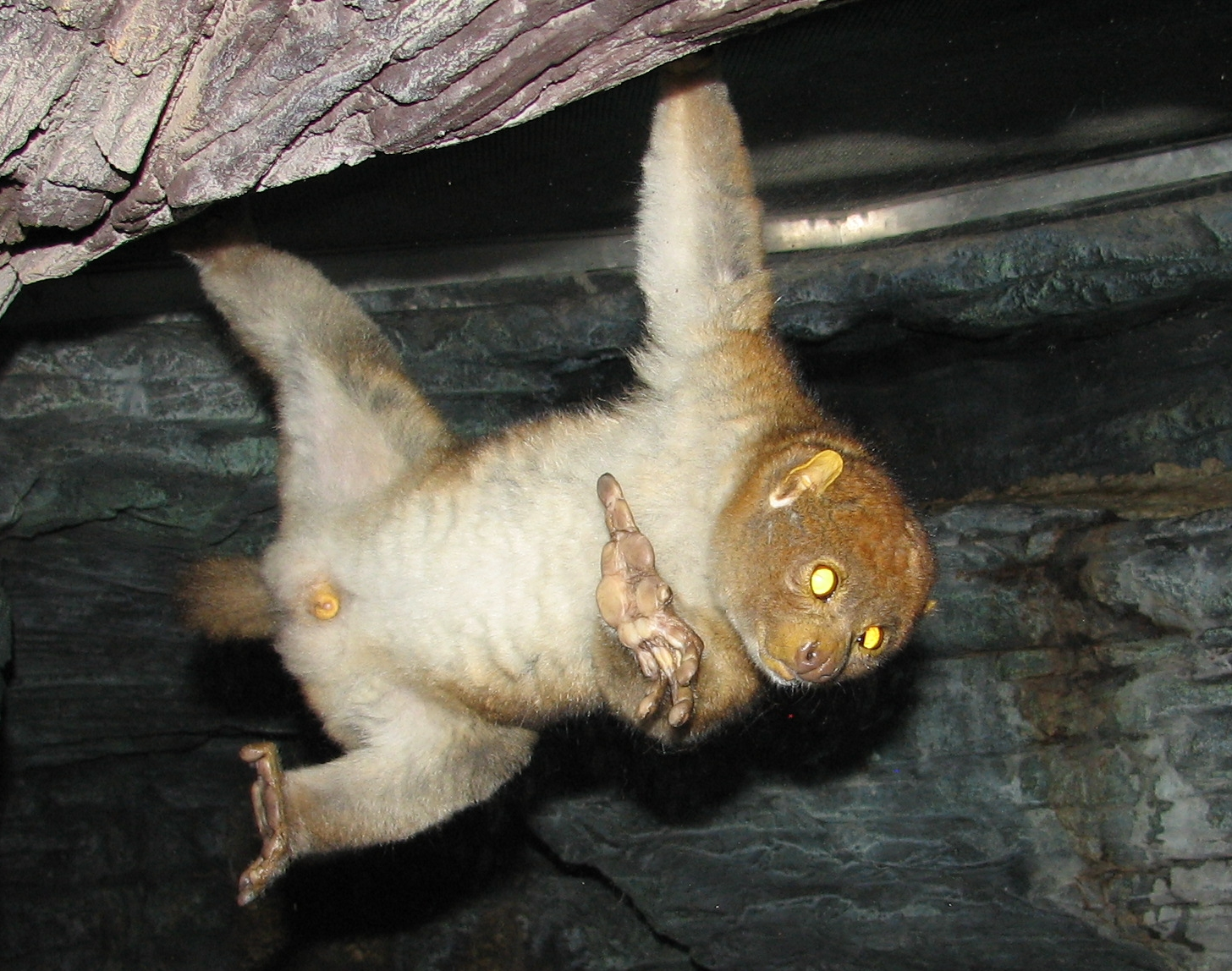
Potto (Perodicticus potto)

- Galagidae (Gray, 1825)
  - Euoticus (Gray, 1863) - needle-clawed galagos
    - Euoticus elegantulus (Le Conte, 1857) - southern needle-clawed galago
    - Euoticus pallidus (Gray, 1863) - northern needle-clawed galago
  - Galagoides (A. Smith, 1833) - dwarf galagos
    - Galagoides thomasi (Elliot, 1907) - Thomas's galago
    - Galagoides orinus (Lawrence & Washburn, 1936) - Uluguru galago
    - Galagoides rondoensis (Honess, 1997) - Rondo galago
    - Galagoides demidovii (G. Fischer, 1806) - Prince Demidoff's galago
  - Sciurocheirus (Gray, 1872) - squirrel galagos
    - Sciurocheirus gabonensis (Gray, 1863) - Gabon galago
    - Sciurocheirus cameronensis (Peters, 1876) - Cross River galago
    - Sciurocheirus alleni (Waterhouse, 1838) - Bioko Allen's galago
  - Otolemur (Coquerel, 1859) - greater bushbabies
    - Otolemur garnettii (Ogilby, 1838) - northern greater galago
    - Otolemur monteiri (Bartlett, 1863) - silvery greater galago
    - Otolemur crassicaudatus (É Geoffroy, 1812) - brown greater galago
  - Galago (É. Geoffroy, 1796) - lesser galagos
    - Galago zanzibaricus (Matschie, 1893) - Zanzibar galago
    - Galago granti (Thomas & Wroughton, 1907) - Grant's galago
    - Galago matschiei (Lorenz, 1917) - dusky galago
    - Galago senegalensis (É. Geoffroy, 1796) - senegal galago
    - Galago nyasae (Elliot, 1907) - Malawi galago
    - Galago moholi (A. Smith, 1836) - Mohol galago
    - Galago gallarum (Thomas, 1901) - Somali galago
- Lorisidae (Gray, 1821)
  - Perodicticinae (Gray, 1870)
    - Arctocebus (Gray, 1863) - angwantibos
      - Arctocebus calabarensis (Smith, 1860) - Calabar angwantibo
      - Arctocebus aureusde (Winton, 1902) - golden angwantibo
    - Pseudopotto (Schwartz, 1996)
      - Pseudopotto martini (Schwartz, 1996) - false potto
    - Perodicticus (Bennett, 1830)
      - Perodicticus potto (Statius Müller, 1766) - potto

=== Lemuriformes (Gray, 1821) ===
==== Daubentonioidea (Gray, 1863) ====
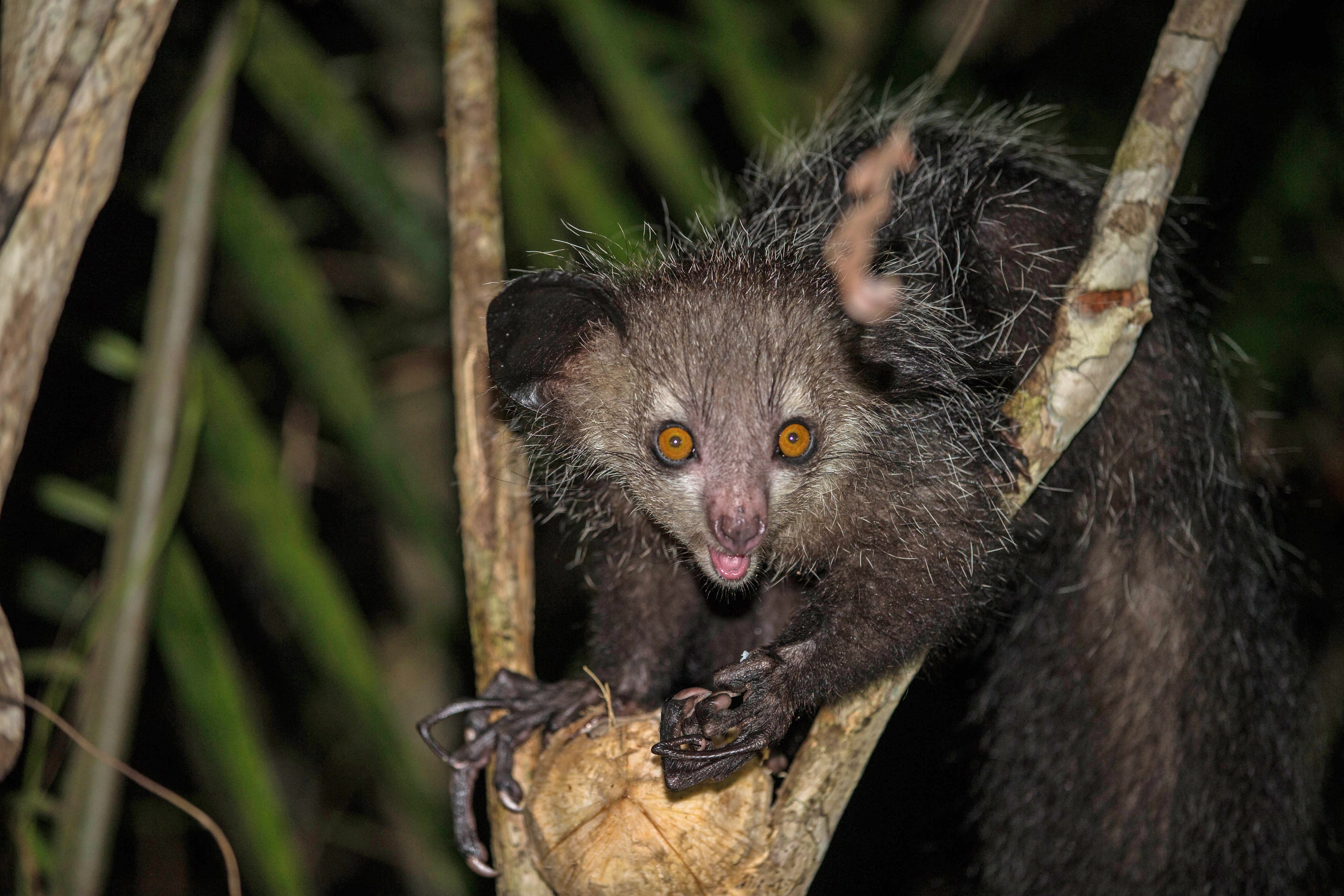
Aye-aye (Daubentonia madagascariensis)

- Daubentoniidae (Gray, 1863)
  - Daubentonia (É. Geoffroy, 1795)
    - †Daubentonia robusta (Lamberton, 1935) - giant aye-aye
    - Daubentonia madagascariensis (Gmelin, 1788) - aye-aye

==== Cheirogaleoidea (Gray, 1872) ====
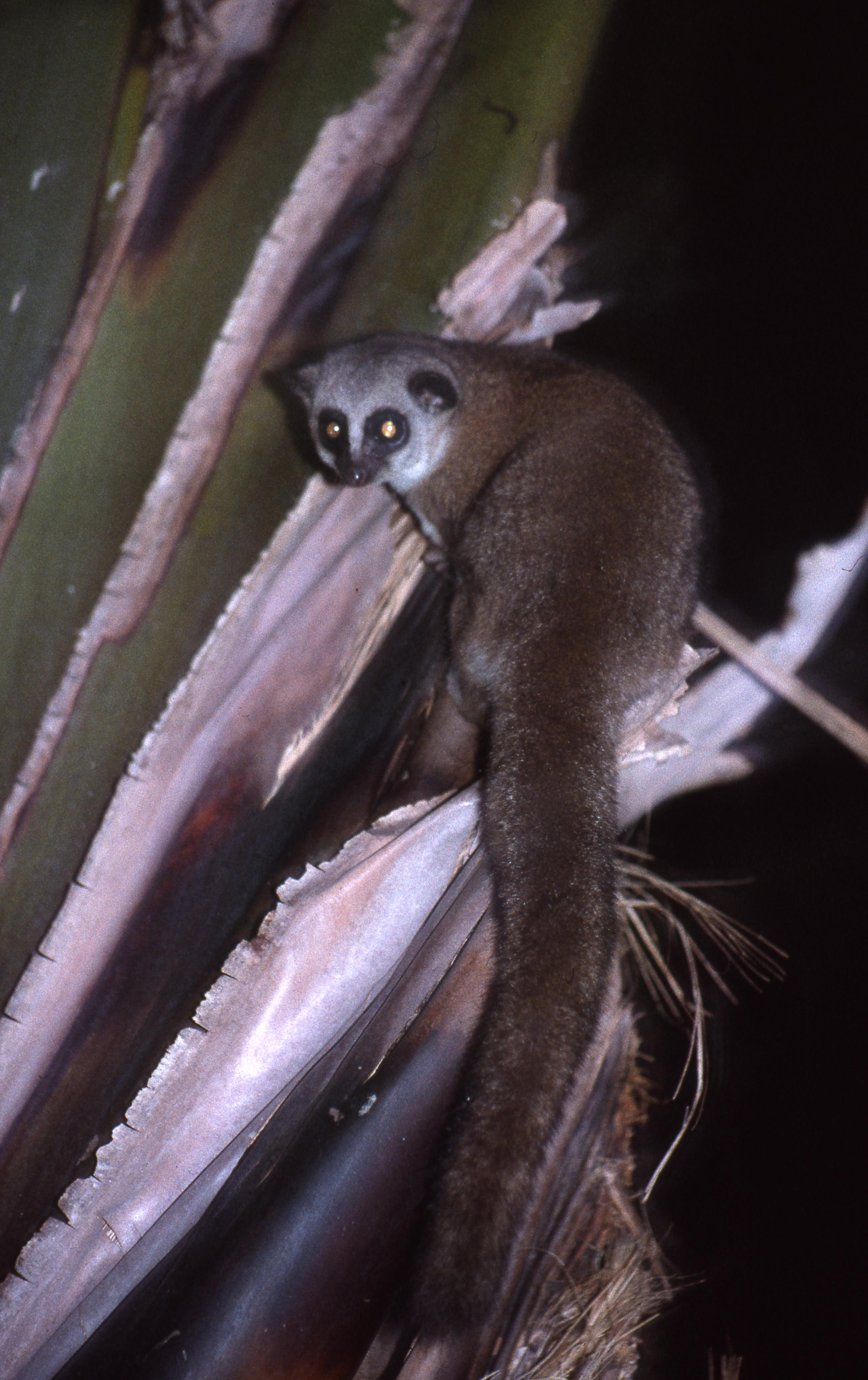
Geoffroy's dwarf lemur (Cheirogaleus major)

- Lepilemuridae (Gray, 1870)
  - Lepilemur (I. Geoffroy, 1851) - sportive lemurs
    - Lepilemur hubbardorum (Louis, Jr, 2006) - Hubbard's sportive lemur
    - Lepilemur wrightae (Louis, Jr, 2006) - Wright's sportive lemur
    - Lepilemur hollandorum (Ramaromilanto & Lei, 2008) - Holland's sportive lemur
    - Lepilemur scottorum (Lei et al., 2008) - Scott's sportive lemur
    - Lepilemur seali (Louis, Jr, 2006) - Seal's sportive lemur
    - Lepilemur fleuretae (Louis, Jr, 2006) - Fleurete's sportive lemur
    - Lepilemur jamesorum (Louis, Jr, 2006) - James' sportive lemur
    - Lepilemur betsileo (Louis, Jr, 2006) - betsileo sportive lemur
    - Lepilemur mustelinus (I. Geoffroy, 1851) - weasel sportive lemur
    - Lepilemur aeeclis (Andriaholinirina, N. et al., 2006) - Antafia sportive lemur
    - Lepilemur randrianasoloi (Andriaholinirina, N. et al., 2006) - Randrianasolo's sportive lemur
    - Lepilemur leucopus (Major, 1894) - white-footed sportive lemur
    - Lepilemur petteri (Louis, Jr, 2006) - Petter's sportive lemur
    - Lepilemur microdon (Forsyth Major, 1894) - small-toothed sportive lemur
    - Lepilemur otto (Craul et al., 2007) - Otto's sportive lemur
    - Lepilemur mittermeieri (Rabarivola et al., 2006) - Mittermeier's sportive lemur
    - Lepilemur grewcockorum (Louis, Jr, 2006) - Grewcock's sportive lemur
    - Lepilemur edwardsi (Forsyth Major, 1894) - Milne-Edwards' sportive lemur
    - Lepilemur ruficaudatus (Grandidier, 1867) - red-tailed sportive lemur
    - Lepilemur septentrionalis (Rumpler & Albignac, 1975) - northern sportive lemur
    - Lepilemur dorsalis (Gray, 1870) - gray-backed sportive lemur
    - Lepilemur sahamalazensis (Andriaholinirina, N. et al., 2006) - Sahamalaza sportive lemur
    - Lepilemur ahmansonorum (Louis, Jr, 2006) - Ahmanson's sportive lemur
    - Lepilemur tymerlachsonorum (Louis, Jr. et al., 2006) - Hawks' sportive lemur
    - Lepilemur milanoii (Louis, Jr, 2006) - Daraina sportive lemur
    - Lepilemur ankaranensis (Rumpler & Albignac, 1975) - Ankarana sportive lemur
- Phaneridae (Rumpler, 1974)
  - Phaner (Gray, 1870) - fork-crowned lemurs
    - Phaner furcifer (Blainville, 1839) - Masoala fork-crowned lemur
    - Phaner parienti (Groves & Tattersall, 1991) - Pariente's fork-crowned lemur
    - Phaner pallescens (Groves and Tattersall, 1991) - pale fork-crowned lemur
    - Phaner electromontis (Groves and Tattersall, 1991) - Amber Mountain fork-marked lemur
- Cheirogaleidae (Gray, 1873)
  - Allocebus (Petter-Rousseaux and Petter, 1967)
    - Allocebus trichotis (Günther, 1875) - hairy-eared dwarf lemur
  - Mirza (Gray, 1870) - giant mouse lemurs
    - Mirza zaza (Kappeler & Roos, 2005) - northern giant mouse lemur
    - Mirza coquereli (A. Grandidier, 1867) - southern giant mouse lemur
  - Microcebus (É. Geoffroy, 1834) - lesser mouse lemurs
    - Microcebus lehilahytsara (Roos & Kappeler, 2005) - Goodman's mouse lemur
    - Microcebus berthae (Rasoloarison et al., 2000) - Madame Berthe's mouse lemur
    - Microcebus ganzhorni (Hotaling et al., 2016) - Ganzhorn's mouse lemur
    - Microcebus tanosi (Rasoloarison et al., 2013) - Anosy mouse lemur
    - Microcebus myoxinus (Peters, 1852) - pygmy mouse lemur
    - Microcebus griseorufus (Kollman, 1910) - reddish-gray mouse lemur
    - Microcebus murinus (Miller, 1777) - gray mouse lemur
    - Microcebus bongolavensis (Olivieri et al., 2007) - Bongolava mouse lemur
    - Microcebus mamiratra (Andriantompohavana et al., 2006) - Claire's mouse lemur
    - Microcebus danfossi (Olivieri et al., 2006) - Danfoss' mouse lemur
    - Microcebus ravelobensis (Zimmerman et al., 1998) - golden-brown mouse lemur
    - Microcebus macarthurii (Radespiel et al., 2008) - MacArthur's mouse lemur
    - Microcebus tavaratra (Rasoloarison et al., 2000) - northern rufous mouse lemur
    - Microcebus gerpi (Radespiel et al., 2012) - Gerp's mouse lemur
    - Microcebus jollyae (Louis et al., 2006) - Jolly's mouse lemur
    - Microcebus simmonsi (Louis et al., 2006) - Simmons' mouse lemur
    - Microcebus mittermeieri (Louis et al., 2006) - Mittermeier's mouse lemur
    - Microcebus marohita (Rasoloarison et al., 2013) - Marohita mouse lemur
    - Microcebus rufus (É. Geoffroy, 1834) - brown mouse lemur
    - Microcebus sambiranensis (Rasoloarison et al., 2000) - Sambirano mouse lemur
    - Microcebus arnholdi (E. Louis, Jr., et al. 2008) - Arnhold's mouse lemur
    - Microcebus margotmarshae (Andriantompohavana et al., 2006) - Margot Marsh's mouse lemur
  - Cheirogaleus (É. Geoffroy, 1812) - greater dwarf lemurs
    - Cheirogaleus minusculus (Groves, 2000) - lesser iron-gray dwarf lemur
    - Cheirogaleus medius (É. Geoffroy, 1812) - fat-tailed dwarf lemur
    - Cheirogaleus sibreei (Forsyth Major, 1896) - Sibree's dwarf lemur
    - Cheirogaleus major (É. Geoffroy, 1812) - Geoffroy's dwarf lemur
    - Cheirogaleus crossleyi (A. Grandidier, 1870) - furry-eared dwarf lemur
    - Cheirogaleus lavasoensis (Thiele et al., 2013) - Lavasoa dwarf lemur

==== Indrioidea (Burnett, 1828) ====
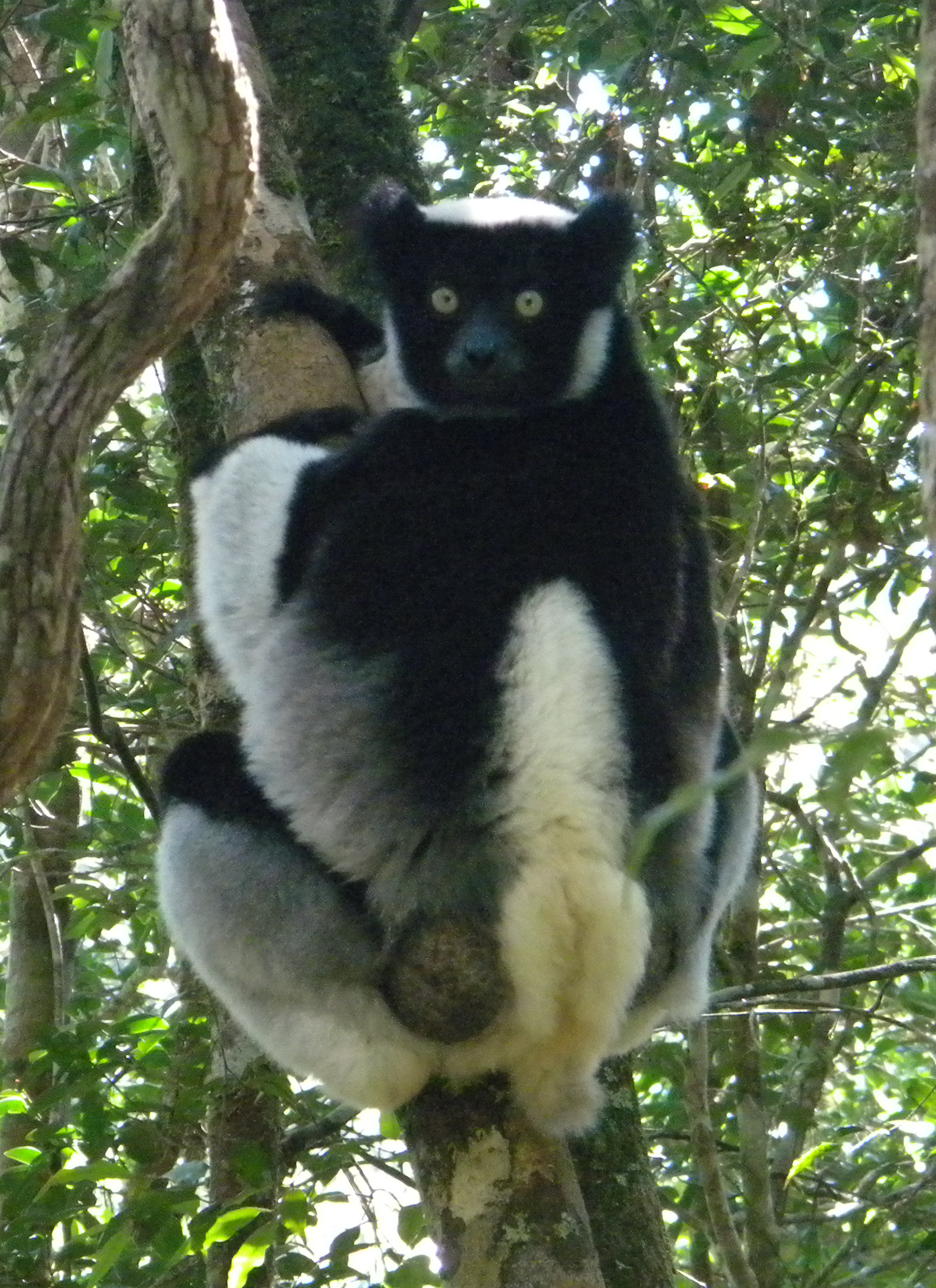
Indri (Indri indri)

- †Archaeolemuridae (Forsyth Major, 1896)
  - †Hadropithecus (Lorenz von Liburnau, 1899)
    - †Hadropithecus stenognathus (Lorenz von Liburnau, 1899) - kidoky
  - †Archaeolemur (Filhol, 1895) - baboon lemurs
    - †Archaeolemur majori (Filhol, 1895) - Major's baboon lemur
    - †Archaeolemur edwardsi (Filhol, 1895) - Milne-Edward's baboon lemur
- Indriidae (Burnett, 1828)
  - Avahi (Jourdan, 1834) - woolly lemurs
    - Avahi mooreorum (Lei, 2008) - Moore's woolly lemur
    - Avahi occidentalis (Lorenz-Liburnau, 1898) - western woolly lemur
    - Avahi cleesei (Thalmann & Geissmann, 2005) - Bemaraha woolly lemur
    - Avahi unicolor (Thalmann & Geissmann, 2000) - Sambirano woolly lemur
    - Avahi laniger (Gmelin, 1788) - eastern woolly lemur
    - Avahi betsileo (Adriantompohavana et al., 2007) - Betsileo woolly lemur
    - Avahi peyrierasi (Zaramody et al., 2006) - Peyrieras's woolly lemur
    - Avahi meridionalis (Zaramody et al., 2006) - southern woolly lemur
    - Avahi ramanantsoavani (Zaramody et al., 2006) - Ramanantsoavana's woolly lemur
  - Propithecus (Bennett, 1832) - sifakas
    - Propithecus coronatus (Milne-Edwards, 1871) - crowned sifaka
    - Propithecus tattersalli (Simons, 1988) - golden-crowned sifaka
    - Propithecus coquereli (A. Grandidier, 1867) - Coquerel's sifaka
    - Propithecus deckenii (Peters, 1870) - Von der Decken's sifaka
    - Propithecus verreauxi (A. Grandidier, 1867) - Verreaux's sifaka
    - Propithecus candidus (A. Grandidier, 1871) - silky sifaka
    - Propithecus perrieri (Lavauden, 1931) - Perrier's sifaka
    - Propithecus edwardsi (A. Grandidier, 1871) - Milne-Edwards's sifaka
    - Propithecus diadema (Bennett, 1832) - diademed sifaka
  - Indri (É. Geoffroy & G. Cuvier, 1796)
    - Indri indri (Gmelin, 1788) - indri
- †Palaeopropithecidae (Tattersall, 1973)
  - †Mesopropithecus (Standing, 1905) - gibbon lemurs
    - †Mesopropithecus globiceps (Standing, 1905) - southern gibbon lemur
    - †Mesopropithecus pithecoides (Standing, 1905) - central gibbon lemur
    - †Mesopropithecus dolichobrachion (Standing, 1905) - northern gibbon lemur
  - †Babakotia (Godfrey et al., 1990)
    - †Babakotia radofilai (Godfrey et al., 1990) - babakoto
  - †Archaeoindris (Standing, 1909)
    - †Archaeoindris fontoynontii (Standing, 1909) - ground sloth lemur
  - †Palaeopropithecus (G. Grandidier, 1899) - tree sloth lemurs
    - †Palaeopropithecus maximus (Standing, 1903) - central sloth lemur
    - †Palaeopropithecus ingens (G. Grandider, 1899) - tratratraztra
    - †Palaeopropithecus kelyus (Gommery & al., 2009) - Kel's sloth lemur

==== Lemuroidea (Gray 1821) ====
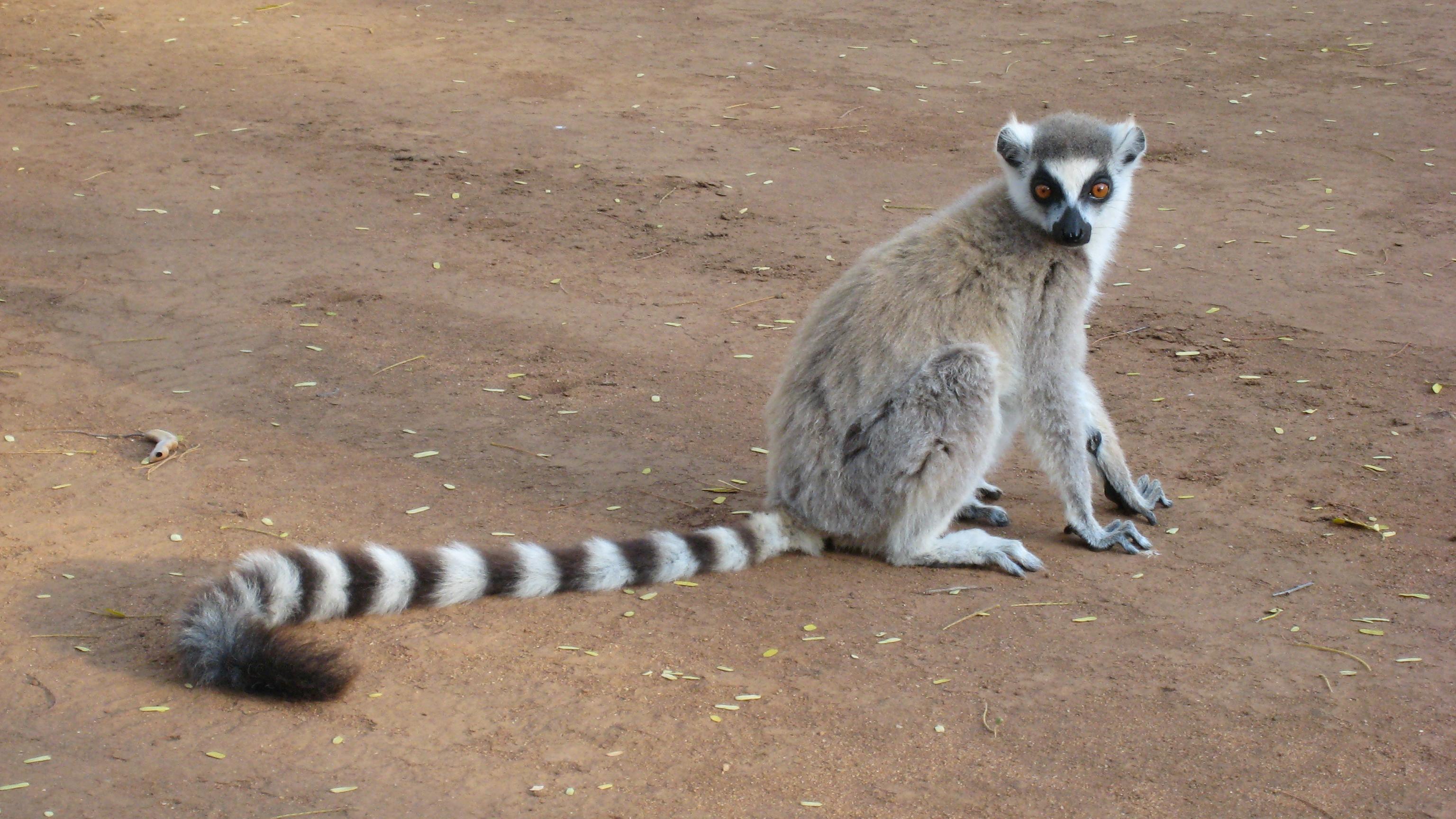
Ring-tailed lemur (Lemur catta)

- †Megaladapidae (Forsyth Major, 1894)
  - †Megaladapis (Forsyth Major, 1894) - koala lemurs
    - †Megaladapis edwardsi (Grandidier, 1899) - Milne-Edward's koala lemur
    - †Megaladapis grandidieri (Standing, 1905) - Grandidier's koala lemur
    - †Megaladapis madagascariensis (Forsyth Major, 1894) - tokandia
- Lemuridae (Gray, 1821)
  - †Pachylemur (Lamberton, 1948) - giant ruffed lemurs
    - †Pachylemur insignis (Filhol, 1895) - central giant ruffed lemur
    - †Pachylemur jullyi (G. Grandidier, 1899) - central giant ruffed lemur
  - Varecia (Gray, 1863) - ruffed lemurs
    - Varecia rubra (É. Geoffroy, 1812) - red ruffed lemur
    - Varecia variegata (Kerr, 1792) - black-and-white ruffed lemur
  - Eulemur (Simons & Rumpler, 1988) - brown lemurs
    - Eulemur coronatus (Gray, 1842) - crowned lemur
    - Eulemur rubriventer (I. Geoffroy, 1850) - red-bellied lemur
    - Eulemur mongoz (Linnaeus, 1766) - mongoose lemur
    - Eulemur flavifrons (Gray, 1867) - blue-eyed black lemur
    - Eulemur macaco (Linnaeus, 1766) - black lemur
    - Eulemur cinereiceps (Grandidier & Milne-Edwards, 1890) - gray-headed lemur
    - Eulemur rufifrons (Bennett, 1833) - red-fronted lemur
    - Eulemur sanfordi (Archbold, 1932) - Sanford's brown lemur
    - Eulemur collaris (É. Geoffroy, 1817) - collared brown lemur
    - Eulemur albifrons (É. Geoffroy, 1796) - white-headed lemur
    - Eulemur fulvus (É. Geoffroy, 1796) - common brown lemur
    - Eulemur rufus (Audebert, 1799) - red lemur
  - Prolemur (Gray, 1871)
    - Prolemur simus (Gray, 1871) - greater bamboo lemur
  - Hapalemur (I. Geoffrey, 1851) - bamboo lemurs
    - Hapalemur aureus (Meier, Albignac et al., 1987) - golden bamboo lemur
    - Hapalemur occidentalis (Rumpler, 1975) - western bamboo lemur
    - Hapalemur alaotrensis (Rumpler, 1975) - Lac Alaotra bamboo lemur
    - Hapalemur meridionalis (Warter, et al., 1987) - southern bamboo lemur
    - Hapalemur griseus (Link, 1795) - eastern bamboo lemur
  - Lemur (Linnaeus, 1758)
    - Lemur catta (Linnaeus, 1758) - ring-tailed lemur

== Haplorhini (Pocock, 1918) ==
=== Simiiformes (Haeckel, 1866) ===
==== Cercopithecoidea (Gray, 1821) ====
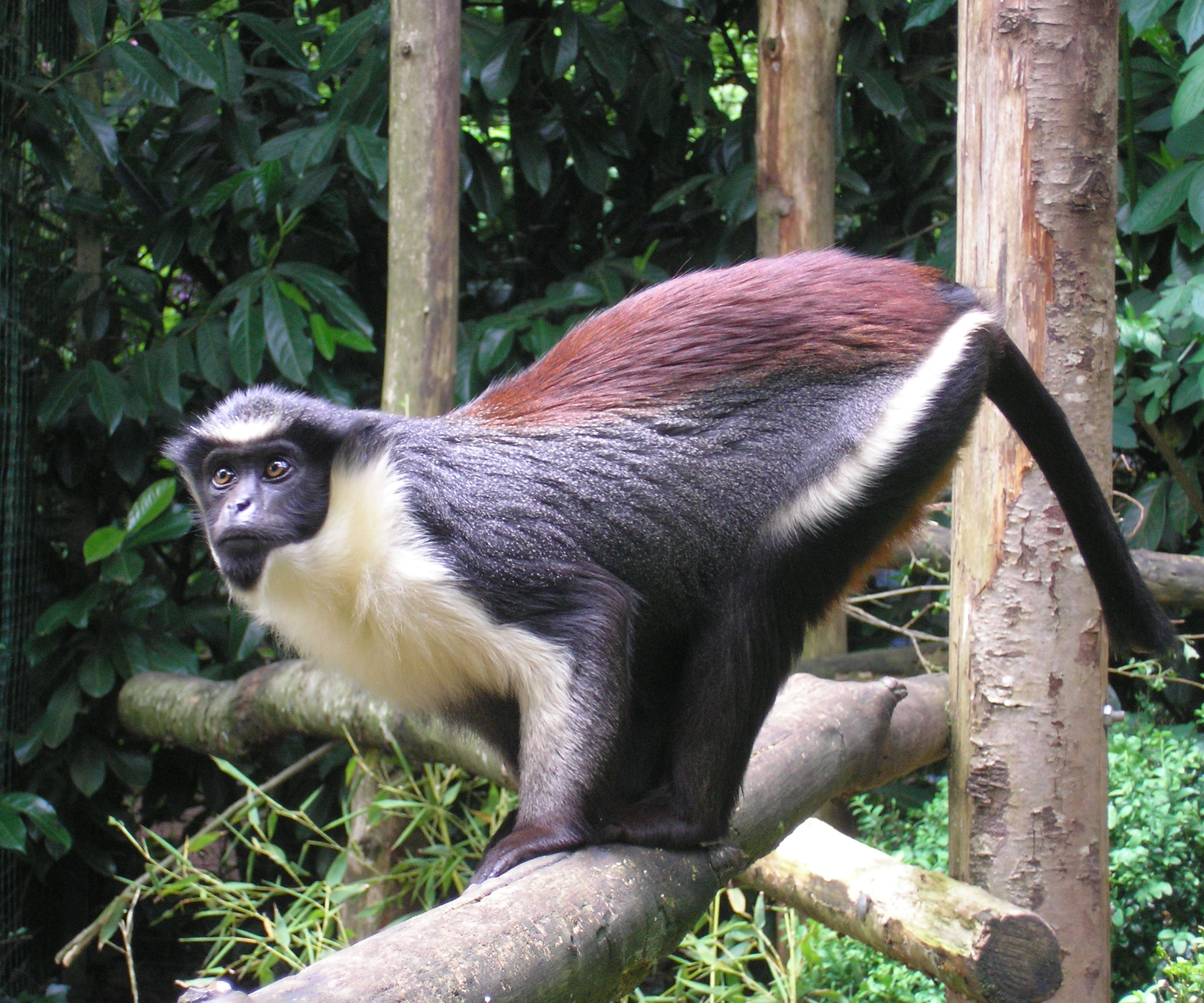
Diana Guenon (Cercopithecus diana)

- Colobidae (Jerdon, 1867)
  - Procolobus (Rochebrune, 1877)
    - Procolobus verus (van Beneden, 1838) - olive colobus
  - Piliocolobus (Rochebrune, 1877) - red colossuses
    - Piliocolobus rufomitratus (Peters, 1879) - Tana River red colobus
    - Piliocolobus preussi (Matschie, 1900) - Preuss's red colobus
    - Piliocolobus epieni (Grubb & Powell, 1999) - Niger Delta red colobus
    - Piliocolobus badius (Kerr, 1792) - western red colobus
    - Piliocolobus pennantii (Waterhouse, 1838) - Pennant's colobus
    - Piliocolobus tephrosceles (Elliot, 1907) - Ugandan red colobus
    - Piliocolobus kirkii (Gray, 1868) - Zanzibar red colobus
    - Piliocolobus gordonorum (Matschie, 1900) - Udzungwa red colobus
    - Piliocolobus foai (de Pousargues, 1899) - Central African red colobus
    - Piliocolobus tholloni (Milne-Edwards, 1886) - Thollon's red colobus
  - Colobus (Illiger, 1811) - black-and-white colossuses
    - Colobus satanas (Waterhouse, 1838) - black colobus
    - Colobus angolensis (P. Sclater, 1860) - Angola colobus
    - Colobus guereza (Rüppell, 1835) - mantled guereza
    - Colobus vellerosus (I. Geoffroy, 1834) - white-thighed colobus
    - Colobus polykomos (Zimmermann, 1780) - king colobus
- Cercopithecidae (Gray, 1821)
  - Papioninae (Groves, 1989)
    - Macaca (Lacépède, 1799) - macaques
      - Macaca sylvanus (Linnaeus, 1758) - Barbary macaque
    - Lophocebus (Palmer, 1903) - crested mangabeys
      - Lophocebus johnstoni (Lydekker, 1900) - Johnston's mangabey
      - Lophocebus osmani (Groves, 1978) - Osman Hill's mangabey
      - Lophocebus aterrimus (Oudemans, 1890) - black crested mangabey
      - Lophocebus ugandae (Matschie, 1912) - Uganda mangabey
      - Lophocebus albigena (Gray, 1850) - grey-cheeked mangabey
      - Lophocebus opdenboschi (Scouteden, 1944) - Opdenbosch's mangabey
    - Theropithecus (I. Geoffroy, 1843)
      - Theropithecus gelada (Rüppell, 1835) - gelada
    - Mandrillus (Ritgen, 1824) - forest baboons
      - Mandrillus leucophaeus (F. Cuvier, 1807) - drill
      - Mandrillus sphinx (Linnaeus, 1758) - mandrill
    - Cercocebus (É. Geoffroy, 1812) - white-eyelid mangabeys
      - Cercocebus sanjei (Mittermeier, 1986) - Sanje mangabey
      - Cercocebus galeritus (Peters, 1879) - Tana River mangabey
      - Cercocebus chrysogaster (Lydekker, 1900) - golden-bellied mangabey
      - Cercocebus agilis (Milne-Edwards, 1886) - agile mangabey
      - Cercocebus atys (Audebert, 1797) - sooty mangabey
      - Cercocebus torquatus (Kerr, 1792) - collared mangabey
    - Rungwecebus (Davenport, 2006)
      - Rungwecebus kipunji (Jones et al., 2005) - kipunji
    - Papio (Erxleben, 1777) - savannah baboons
      - Papio papio (Desmarest, 1820) - guinea baboon
      - Papio ursinus (Kerr, 1792) - chacma baboon
      - Papio cynocephalus (Linnaeus, 1766) - yellow baboon
      - Papio hamadryas (Linnaeus, 1758) - hamadryas baboon
      - Papio anubis (Lesson, 1827) - olive baboon
  - Cercopithecinae (Gray, 1821)
    - Allenopithecus (Lang, 1923)
      - Allenopithecus nigroviridis (Pocock, 1907) - Allen's swamp monkey
    - Miopithecus (I. Geoffroy, 1842) - talapoins
      - Miopithecus ogouensis (Kingdon, 1997) - Gabon talapoin
      - Miopithecus talapoin (Schreber, 1774) - Angolan talapoin
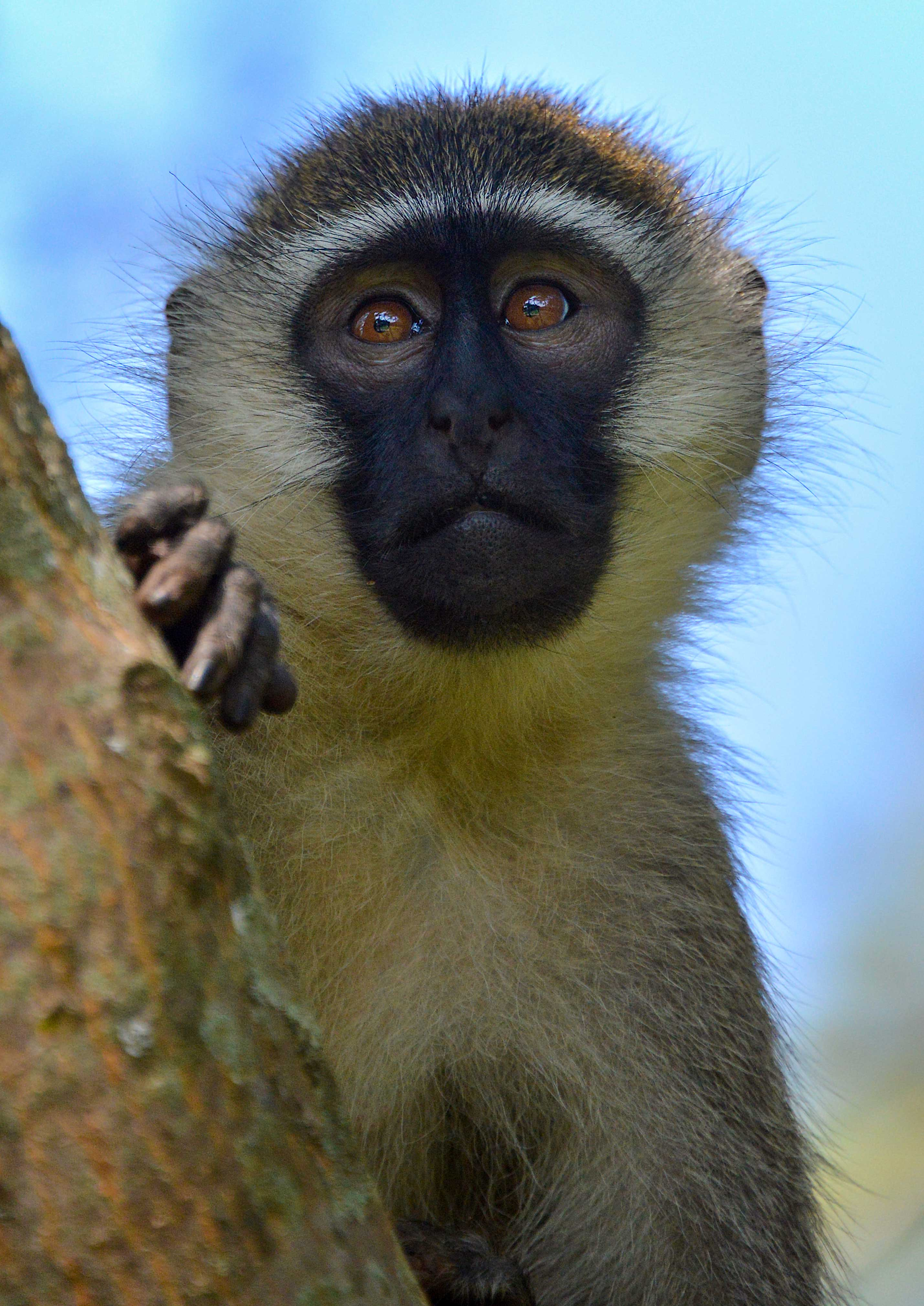
        Vervet Monkey in Uganda
    - Chlorocebus (Gray, 1870) - savanna guenons
      - Chlorocebus tantalus (Ogilby, 1841) - tantalus guenon
      - Chlorocebus cynosuros (Scopoli, 1786) - Malbrouck guenon
      - Chlorocebus djamdjamensis (Neumann, 1902) - Bale Mountains guenon
      - Chlorocebus aethiops (Linnaeus, 1758) - Grivet
      - Chlorocebus pygerythrus (F. Cuvier, 1821) - vervet monkey
      - Chlorocebus sabaeus (Linnaeus, 1758) - green monkey
    - Erythrocebus (Trouessart, 1897)
      - Erythrocebus patas (Schreber, 1775) - patas monkey
    - Cercopithecus (Linnaeus, 1758) - forest guenons
      - Cercopithecus solatus (M. J. S. Harrison, 1988) - sun-tailed guenon
      - Cercopithecus preussi (Matschie, 1898) - Preuss's monkey
      - Cercopithecus lhoesti (P. Sclater, 1899) - L'Hoest's monkey
      - Cercopithecus hamlyni (Pocock, 1907) - Hamlyn's monkey
      - Cercopithecus lomamiensis (Hart et al., 2012) - lesula
      - Cercopithecus neglectus (Schlegel, 1876) - De Brazza's monkey
      - Cercopithecus pogonias (Bennett, 1833) - crested mona monkey
      - Cercopithecus denti (Thomas, 1907) - Dent's mona monkey
      - Cercopithecus wolfi (Meyer, 1891) - Wolf's mona monkey
      - Cercopithecus mona (Schreber, 1774) - mona monkey
      - Cercopithecus lowei (Thomas, 1923) - Lowe's mona monkey
      - Cercopithecus campbelli (Waterhouse, 1838) - Campbell's mona monkey
      - Cercopithecus dryas (Schwarz, 1932) - Dryas monkey
      - Cercopithecus roloway (Schreber, 1774) - roloway monkey
      - Cercopithecus diana (Linnaeus, 1758) - Diana monkey
      - Cercopithecus nictitans (Linnaeus, 1766) - greater spot-nosed monkey
      - Cercopithecus albogularis (Sykes, 1831) - Sykes' monkey
      - Cercopithecus mitis (Wolf, 1822) - blue monkey
      - Cercopithecus doggetti (Pocock, 1907) - silver monkey
      - Cercopithecus kandti (Matschie, 1905) - golden monkey
      - Cercopithecus petaurista (Schreber, 1774) - lesser spot-nosed guenon
      - Cercopithecus erythrotis (Waterhouse, 1838) - red-eared guenon
      - Cercopithecus cephus (Linnaeus, 1758) - moustached guenon
      - Cercopithecus ascanius (Audebert, 1799) - red-tailed guenon
      - Cercopithecus sclateri (Pocock, 1904) - Sclater's guenon
      - Cercopithecus erythrogaster (Gray, 1866) - white-throated guenon

==== Hominoidea (Gray, 1825) ====
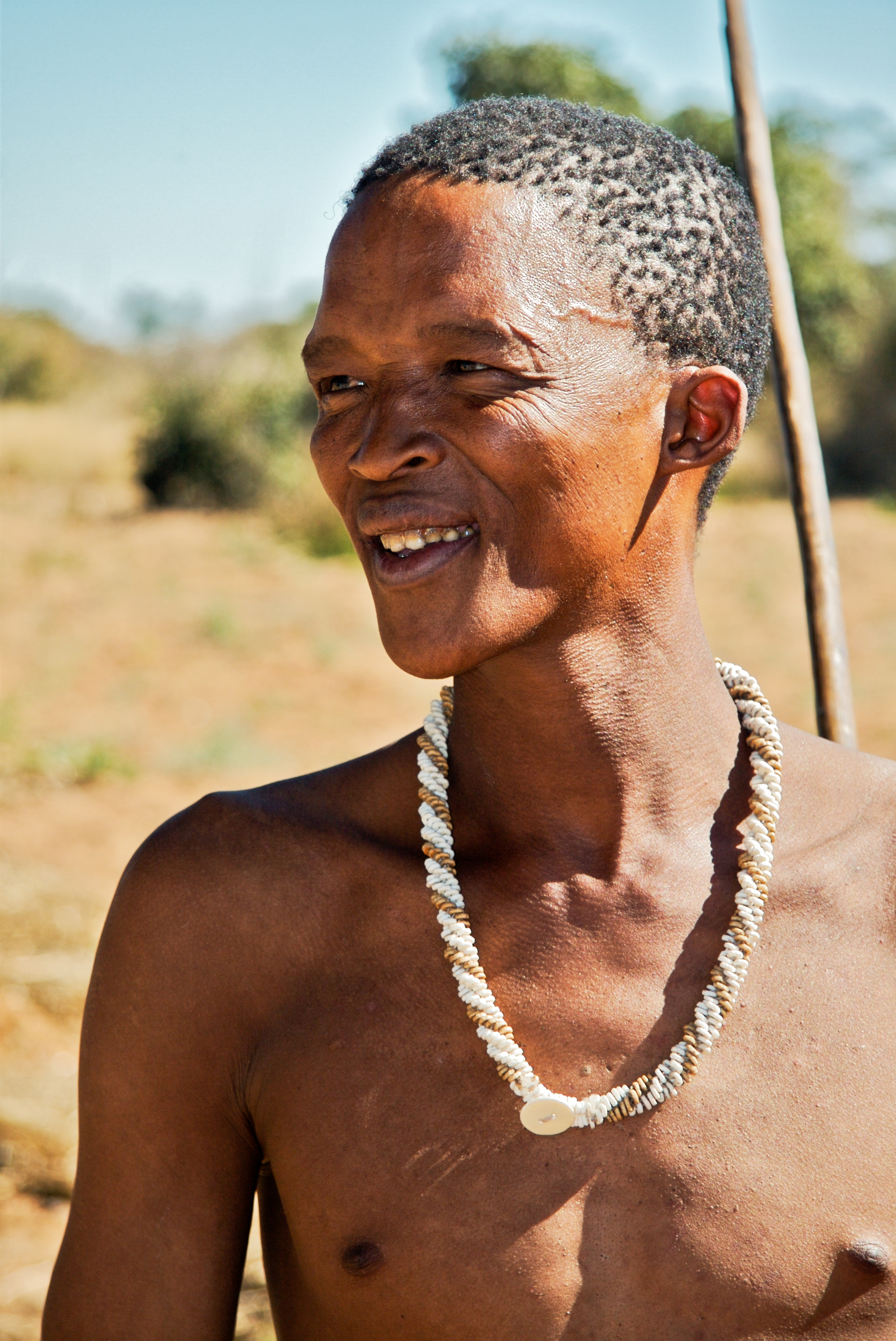
Human (Homo sapiens)

- Hominidae (Gray, 1825)
  - Gorilla (I. Geoffroy, 1852)
    - Gorilla beringei (Matschie, 1903) - eastern gorilla
    - Gorilla gorilla (Savage, 1847) - Western gorilla
  - Pan (Oken, 1816)
    - Pan paniscus (Schwarz, 1929) - bonobo
    - Pan troglodytes (Blumenbach, 1776) - Chimpanzee
  - Homo (Linnaeus, 1758)
    - Homo sapiens (Linnaeus, 1758) - human

== See also ==
- List of primates
