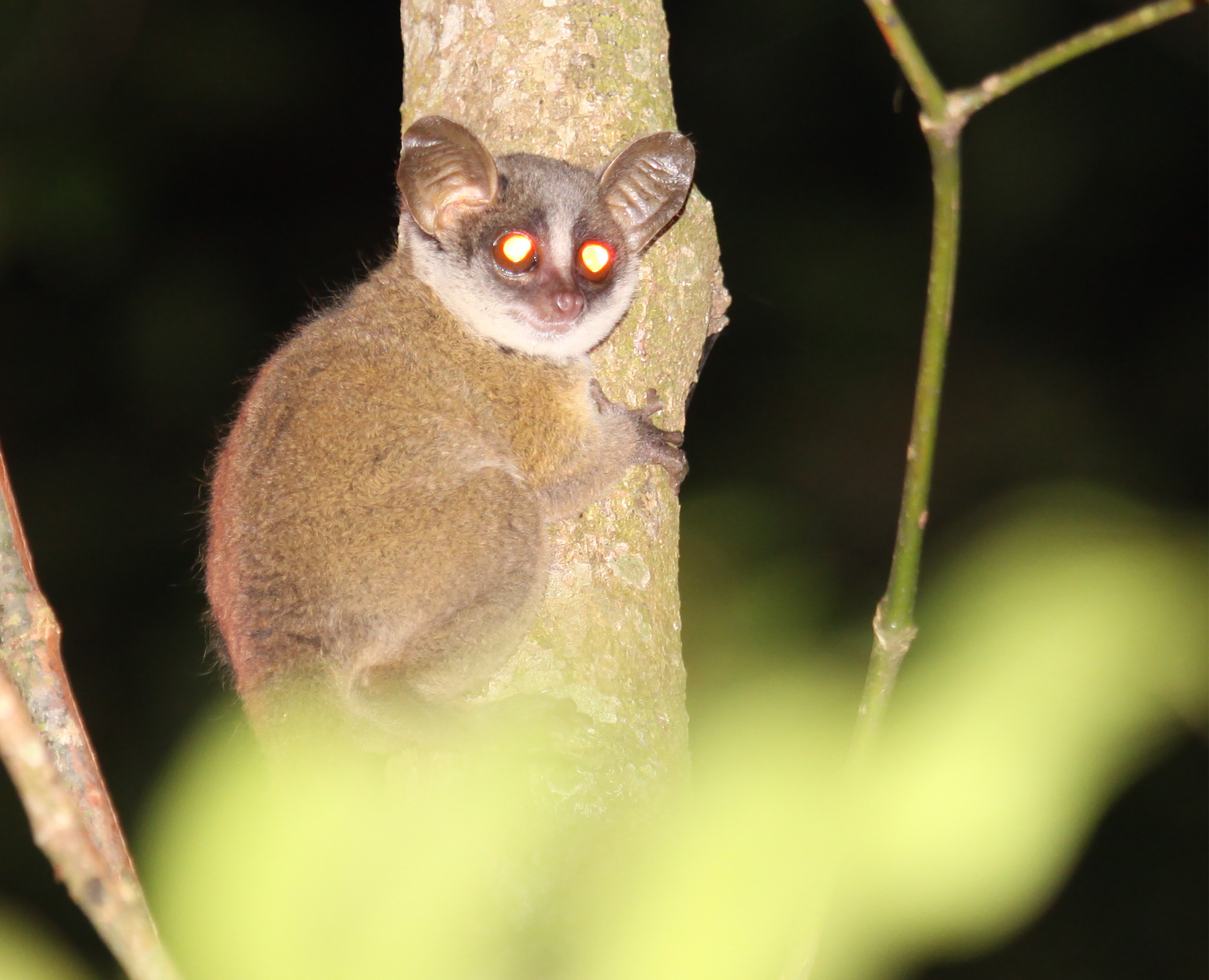

Conservation status
- Least Concern (IUCN 3.1)

Scientific classification
- Kingdom: Animalia
- Phylum: Chordata
- Class: Mammalia
- Order: Primates
- Suborder: Strepsirrhini
- Family: Galagidae
- Genus: Paragalago
- Species: P. cocos

Binomial name
- Paragalago cocos Heller, 1912
- Kenya coast galago range

= Kenya coast galago =

Species of primate

The Kenya coast galago (Paragalago cocos) is a species of primate in the family Galagidae. It is found across Kenya and Tanzania, particularly around the northern coastal area of each of the countries, and has been located living from sea level to around 350 metres (1,150 ft) above sea level.

== Description ==
The Kenya coast galago has a dark, blackish patch on either side of the muzzle, and has light brown hair covering its body. It is morphologically similar to both P. z. udzungwensis and P. z. zanzibaricus and though it is generally slightly larger than them, it has a high interspecific overlap in body size, meaning that there has been confusion over the taxonomy of the species. However, the Kenya coast galago, like many other galagos, has its own unique call, which has been called an incremental call and separates it from any other species in the same genus.

== Habitat ==
The Kenya coast galago is found in the middle storey of coastal lowland tropical moist forest, riverine forest, and some secondary growth such as cultivated mosaic habitat and rural gardens around the northern coast of Kenya and Tanzania, and lives from sea level to at least 210 m (690 ft) above sea level over the coastal zone of Kenya, and to at least 350 m (1,150 ft) in the foothills of the East Usambara Mountains, Tanzania.
