= Pliogalago =

Pliogalago Temporal range: Early Pliocene

Scientific classification
- Kingdom: Animalia
- Phylum: Chordata
- Class: Mammalia
- Infraclass: Placentalia
- Order: Primates
- Suborder: Strepsirrhini
- Family: Galagidae
- Genus: †Pliogalago
- Species: †P. makahmera

Binomial name
- †Pliogalago makahmera Harrison and Haile-Selassie, 2026

Extinct genus of bush baby

Pliogalago is an extinct monotypic genus of galagid primate that lived in Ethiopia during the late Zanclean stage of the Pliocene epoch.

== Etymology ==
The generic name Pliogalago refers to the animal's status as a galago from the Pliocene epoch. The specific epithet of the type species, Pliogalago makahmera, references the fossil site of Makah Mera, where the type specimen was discovered.
