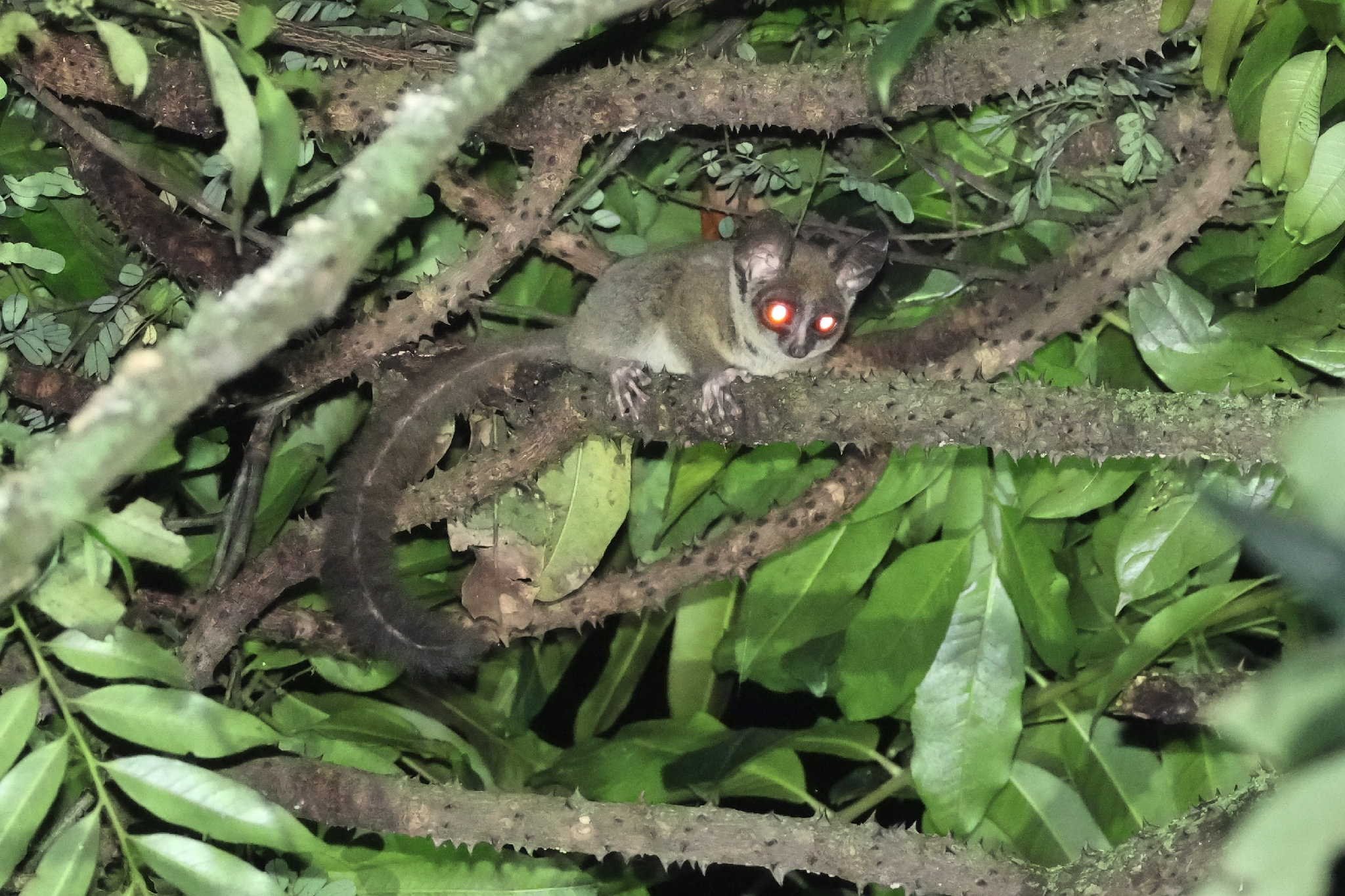

Conservation status
- Least Concern (IUCN 3.1)

Scientific classification
- Kingdom: Animalia
- Phylum: Chordata
- Class: Mammalia
- Infraclass: Placentalia
- Order: Primates
- Suborder: Strepsirrhini
- Family: Galagidae
- Genus: Galago
- Species: G. matschiei

Binomial name
- Galago matschiei Lorenz, 1917
- Geographic range

Synonyms
- Euoticus inustus Schwarz, 1930

= Dusky bushbaby =

Species of primate

The dusky bushbaby (Galago matschiei) is a species of primate in the family Galagidae. It is also known as Matschie's galago, in honour of the German zoologist Paul Matschie, curator of mammals at the Museum für Naturkunde in Berlin. Native to tropical Central Africa, it is found in forests in Burundi, Rwanda, Democratic Republic of the Congo and Uganda. The species is small with a long tail, and has an arboreal, nocturnal and omnivorous lifestyle.

== Description ==
The dusky bushbaby is a medium-sized galago with a head-and-body length of approximately 166 mm (7 in) and a tail of 255 mm (10 in). It weighs around 210 g (7 oz). The face is distinctively marked with a broad pale streak extending from the snout to the fore-head. The large eyes have amber-coloured irises and are surrounded by brownish-black eye rings, outside which is a ridge, particularly obvious on the fore-head. The cheeks are pale grey and the long ears are either black or tipped with black. The upper parts of the body and limbs are dark brown, with a yellowish tinge on the shoulder. The sides of the neck, throat, underparts and underside of the limbs are pale grey. The tail is evenly furred throughout its length and not, or only slightly, bushy, dark grey or greyish-brown, darker towards the tip. The tail is often kept loosely coiled when the animal is at rest, and sometimes when it is in motion. The nails have slightly raised ridges on the upper surfaces and sharp, projecting points. The eye shine of this bushbaby is orange.

== Distribution and habitat ==
The range is restricted to the Albertine Rift region of Uganda, Burundi, Rwanda and the Democratic Republic of Congo, with some sightings further east in Uganda, though some of these may have been of Thomas's bushbaby (Galagoides thomasi). It occurs in both primary and secondary forest in both lowland and lower montane habitats, especially in forests dominated by the Guinea plum (Parinari excelsa).

== Ecology ==
Similar to other galagos, the dusky bushbaby is nocturnal and usually solitary, and hides in a hole by day. It forages mostly in the mid and lower parts of the canopy. The diet includes beetles, moths and caterpillars as well as fruits, flowers and gums. The breeding habits of this species are poorly known, but reproduction may peak in November and December, with one to four young being raised annually. Mothers carry their infants in their mouths, and sometimes "park" them on branches near the nest hole.

== Status ==
G. matschiei is relatively common in parts of its range and is present in a number of well-protected areas. The main threat is deforestation and the population is probably declining, but probably not at a sufficiently fast rate to threaten the species, and the International Union for Conservation of Nature has assessed its conservation status as being of "least concern".
