= Opdenbosch's mangabey =

Conservation status
- Vulnerable (IUCN 3.1)

Scientific classification
- Kingdom: Animalia
- Phylum: Chordata
- Class: Mammalia
- Order: Primates
- Family: Cercopithecidae
- Genus: Lophocebus
- Species: L. aterrimus
- Subspecies: L. a. opdenboschi

Trinomial name
- Lophocebus aterrimus opdenboschi Schouteden, 1944

Subspecies of Old World monkey

Opdenbosch's mangabey (Lophocebus aterrimus opdenboschi) is a subspecies of crested mangabey in the family Cercopithecidae. It has also been treated as a full species. It is found in the Democratic Republic of the Congo (formerly Belgian Congo).
