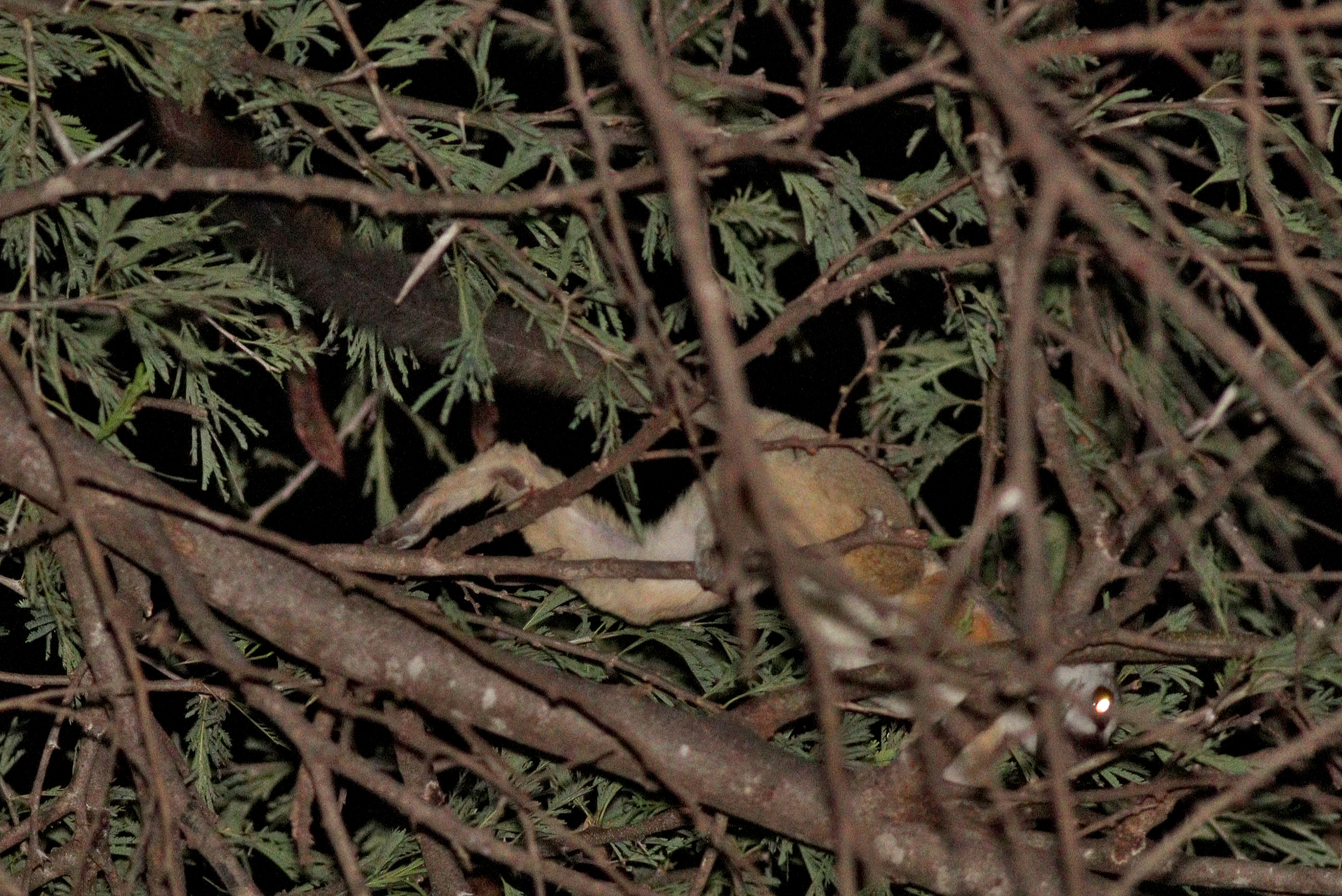

Conservation status
- Least Concern (IUCN 3.1)

Scientific classification
- Kingdom: Animalia
- Phylum: Chordata
- Class: Mammalia
- Infraclass: Placentalia
- Order: Primates
- Suborder: Strepsirrhini
- Family: Galagidae
- Genus: Galago
- Species: G. gallarum

Binomial name
- Galago gallarum Thomas, 1901
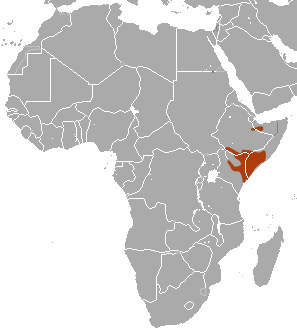
- Somali bushbaby range

= Somali bushbaby =

Species of primate

The Somali bushbaby (Galago gallarum), or the Somali lesser galago, as it is also known, is a species of nocturnal, arboreal primate in the family Galagidae. It is found in Ethiopia, Kenya, and Somalia. It is threatened by habitat loss.

== Distribution ==
The Somali Bushbaby is found in Kenya, Somalia and Ethiopia. Unlike other galagos, it is endemic to the thorny woodland/scrub and semi-arid thorn scrub which covers large tracts of south-western Ethiopia, Kenya (except for the coastal strip, semi-desert region east of Lake Turkana, and area east of Lake Victoria), and in Somalia from Odweina near the Red sea southward to the border with Kenya.

== Taxonomy ==
First described by Oldfield Thomas in 1901, it was later classified as one of the many subspecies of the Senegal lesser galago Galago senegalensis. T.R. Olson, in his Ph.D. thesis in 1979, and his paper of 1986, raised it once again to the status of a separate species, which reclassification has not been disputed by other academics. The Somali lesser galago is considered to be a monotypic species, i.e. no subspecies have been defined.

== Description ==
The Somali lesser galago is a medium-sized galago with overall length of adult males as 415 to 464 millimetres (16.3 to 18.3 in) and average length of 436 millimetres (17.2 in) while that of the female is 380 to 442 millimetres (15.0 to 17.4 in) with average length of 413 millimetres (16.3 in) . The average tail length is 259 millimetres (10.2 in) for males while it is 246 millimetres (9.7 in) for females. The mean hind foot length is 67 millimetres (2.6 in) for males while it is 63 millimetres (2.5 in) for females. Likewise, the mean ear lengths for male and female are 35 millimetres (1.4 in) and 34 millimetres (1.3 in) respectively.

The galago's face and throat are whitish while the ears, eye-rings, muzzle and tail are black or dark brown providing a distinctive contrast. The galago has a pale belly with particolored hair, which is Grey for most of its length except for its tip which is buff in color, resulting in the galago looking sand-colored by day and grayish by night.

G. gallarum is sympatric with G. senegalensis but is differentiated in the measurements of hind limb, hind foot, ear and tail-length. In the field, the general appearance, call and preferred habitat aid in discriminating between them. The Kenyan coast galago Gallagoides cocos is another species the range of which overlaps the southern margin of the Somali galago's range in Kenya and Somalia. Both these galagoes have calls distinct from that of the Somali galago and occupy moister habitats. The ears of these galagoes appear Grey and brown respectively with a pink patch visible in front of the lower ear.
