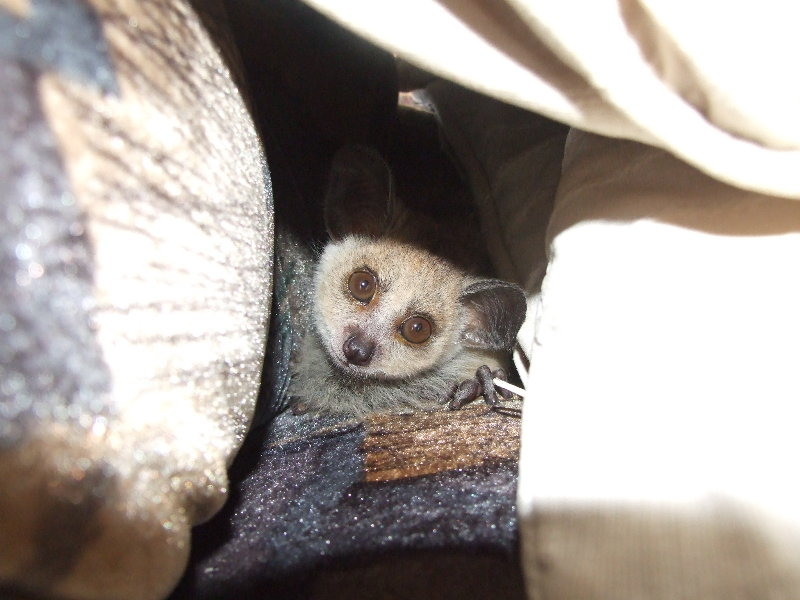
- Juvenile Grant's bushbaby (P. granti)

Scientific classification
- Kingdom: Animalia
- Phylum: Chordata
- Class: Mammalia
- Order: Primates
- Suborder: Strepsirrhini
- Family: Galagidae
- Genus: Paragalago; Masters et al., 2017

Type species
- Galago zanzibaricus Matschie, 1893

Species
- Paragalago cocos Paragalago granti Paragalago orinus Paragalago rondoensis Paragalago zanzibaricus

= Eastern dwarf galago =

Paragalago

Genus of strepsirrhine primates

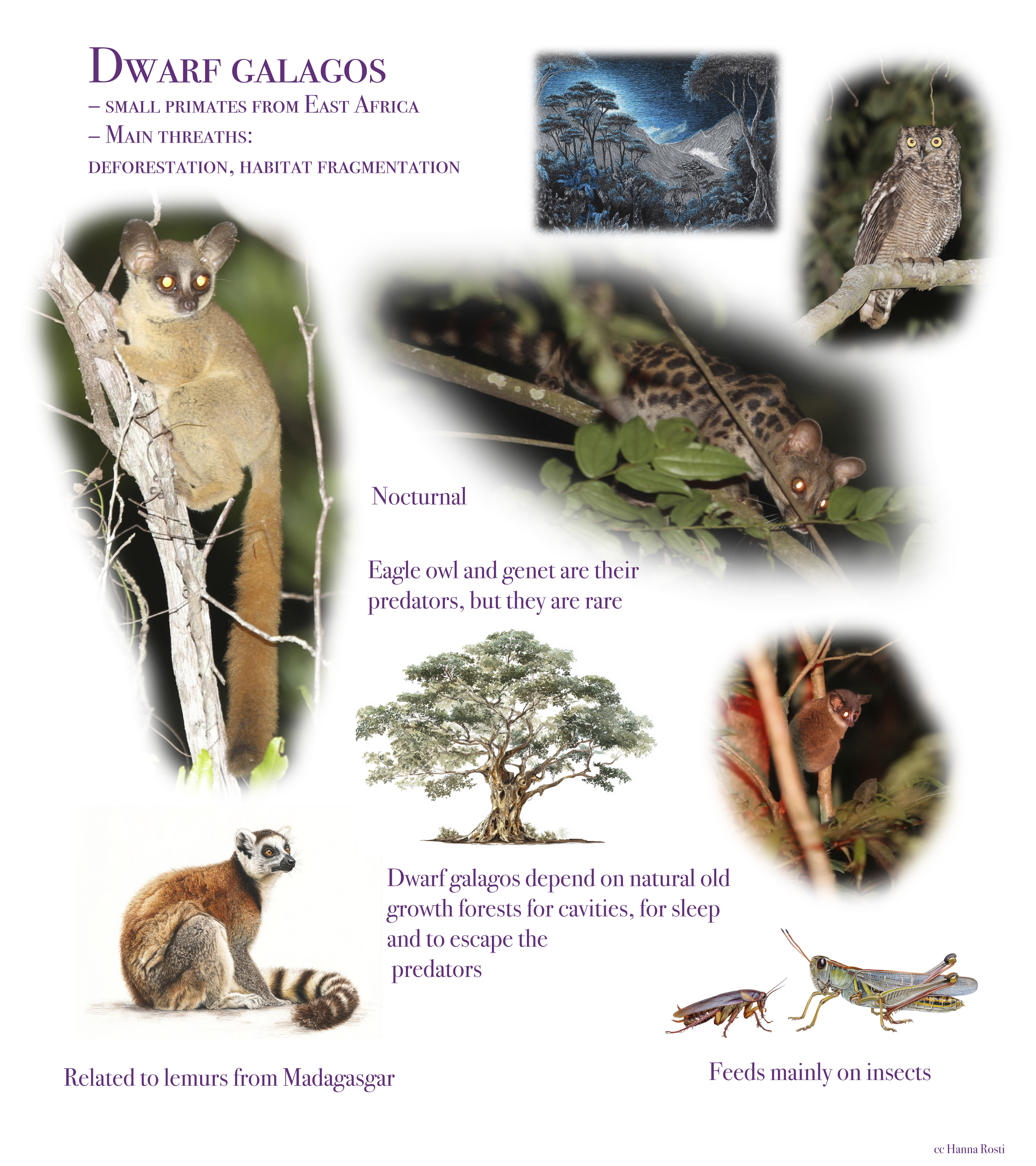
Paragalago – dwarf galago poster. Hanna Rosti 2026.

The eastern dwarf galagos are a group of five species of strepsirrhine primates of the family Galagidae, native to East Africa. They were formerly classified in the genus Galagoides but have been moved to their own genus, Paragalago, based on genetic evidence, and supported by differences in vocalizations and morphology. The three western/Congolian species remain in Galagoides.

The two genera are not sister taxa and thus apparently evolved their small sizes and some morphological similarities via parallel evolution, although members of the eastern group tend to be larger. They are separated by the East African Rift. Paragalago is actually sister to the genus of 'lesser galagos', Galago, which are similar in size. There is limited sympatry between Paragalago and the much more widely distributed Galago. Paragalago members range in mass from 60 to 250 g (2.1 to 8.8 oz), considered small to medium-sized among galagids.

All five species have been evaluated by the IUCN. P. orinus is considered to be vulnerable, P. rondoensis to be endangered, P. zanzibaricus is listed as near threatened, while P. cocos and P. granti are of least concern.

The Taita mountain dwarf galago, found in the Taita Hills, is unclassified.Based on vocalizations, it may be the Kenya coast galago. These dwarf galagos are present in very small forest fragments and are in immediate danger of extinction.

== Paragalago species ==
Genus Paragalago – Masters et al., 2017 – five species
Common name	Scientific name and subspecies	Range	Size and ecology	IUCN status and estimated population
Grant's bushbaby	P. granti (Thomas & Wroughton, 1907)	Southeastern Africa	Size: 14–19 cm (6–7 in) long, plus 20–27 cm (8–11 in) tail Habitat: Forest Diet: Invertebrates, fruit, gum, and flowers, as well as small birds	LC Unknown
Kenya coast galago	P. cocos (Heller, 1912)	Southeastern Africa	Size: 14–19 cm (6–7 in) long, plus 18–23 cm (7–9 in) tail Habitat: Forest Diet: Insects and fruit	LC Unknown
Rondo dwarf galago	P. rondoensis (Honess, 1997)	Scattered Tanzania in southeastern Africa	Size: 10–13 cm (4–5 in) long, plus 17–18 cm (7 in) tail Habitat: Forest Diet: Insects, as well as fruit and gum	EN Unknown
Uluguru bushbaby	P. orinus (Lawrence & Washburn, 1936)	Southeastern Africa	Size: 12–14 cm (5–6 in) long, plus 16–20 cm (6–8 in) tail Habitat: Forest Diet: Gum, nectar, invertebrates, and small vertebrates	VU Unknown
Zanzibar bushbaby	P. zanzibaricus (Matschie, 1893) Two subspecies: P. z. udzungwensis (Udzungwa bushbaby); P. z. zanzibaricus (Zanzibar bushbaby)	Scattered Tanzania	Size: 14–15 cm (6–6 in) long, plus 12–15 cm (5–6 in) tail Habitat: Forest Diet: Fruit, insects, and gum	NT Unknown

== Sources ==
- Kingdon, Jonathan (2020). The Kingdon Pocket Guide to African Mammals (2nd ed.). Bloomsbury Publishing. ISBN 978-1-4729-8320-6.
- Stuart, Chris; Stuart, Mathilde (2017). Stuarts' Field Guide to the Larger Mammals of Africa (4th ed.). Penguin Random House South Africa. ISBN 978-1-77584-276-7.
