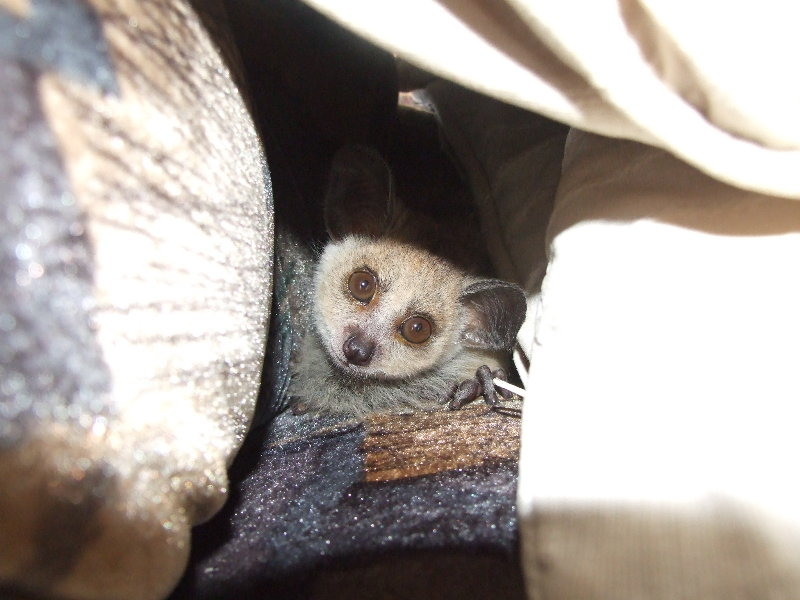
- Juvenile (approx. 4 months)

Conservation status
- Least Concern (IUCN 3.1)

Scientific classification
- Kingdom: Animalia
- Phylum: Chordata
- Class: Mammalia
- Infraclass: Placentalia
- Order: Primates
- Suborder: Strepsirrhini
- Family: Galagidae
- Genus: Paragalago
- Species: P. granti

Binomial name
- Paragalago granti (Thomas & Wroughton, 1907)
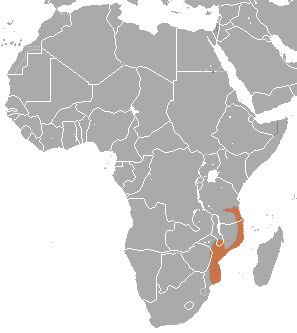
- Grant's bushbaby range

Synonyms
- Galago granti Thomas & Wroughton, 1907; Galagoides granti (Thomas & Wroughton, 1907); Galagoides nyasae (Elliot, 1907)

= Grant's bushbaby =

Species of primate

Grant's bushbaby (Paragalago granti), also known as Grant's lesser bushbaby or the Mozambique lesser bushbaby, is a species of primate in the family Galagidae. It is found in Malawi, Mozambique, Tanzania, and Zimbabwe. Its natural habitat is subtropical or tropical dry forests. It is a common species and the International Union for Conservation of Nature has assessed its conservation status as being of "least concern".

== Description ==
Grant's bushbaby is a small galago with a long, slender, well-furred tail. The sexes are similar. The forehead is pale grey and the crown darker grey, the eyes are surrounded by blackish eye-rings, and this black colour continues along the snout. There is a pale band running down the snout from forehead to nostrils. The ears are long and broad, with rounded tips, and are black on the outside. The general colour of the pelage is drab brown, the tip of each hair being buffy-brown. The outside of each limb is drab brown, gradually fading to whitish at the feet. The cheeks, throat and underparts are creamy-buff, the basal part of each hair being grey. The tail is elongated and bushy, drab brown with a blackened tip.

== Distribution and habitat ==
Grant's bushbaby is native to Tanzania, Malawi, Mozambique and Zimbabwe. It occurs near the East African coast in the area between the Rufiji River in Tanzania, southwards to the Limpopo River in southern Mozambique. There are also inland populations, separate from the coastal ones. It occurs at least as high as 1,800 m (5,900 ft) in the Thyolo Mountains in Malawi and in the Chimanimani region of Zimbabwe. It inhabits coastal and montane mixed forest, gallery forests and miombo woodland.
