= Rondo dwarf galago =

Conservation status
- Endangered (IUCN 3.1)

Scientific classification
- Kingdom: Animalia
- Phylum: Chordata
- Class: Mammalia
- Order: Primates
- Suborder: Strepsirrhini
- Family: Galagidae
- Genus: Paragalago
- Species: P. rondoensis

Binomial name
- Paragalago rondoensis Honess, 1997
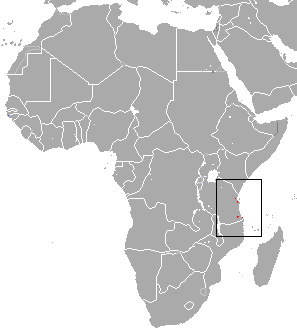
- Range

Synonyms
- Galago rondoensis Honess in Kingdon, 1997

Species of primate

The Rondo dwarf galago (Paragalago rondoensis) or Rondo bushbaby is a species of primate in the family Galagidae. The dwarf galagos are the smallest members of the genus Galagoides. It weighs less than 100 grams, making it the smallest known galago. It is endemic to Tanzania where its natural habitat is subtropical or tropical dry forests. It lives in an area reported in 2012 to be less than 100 square kilometers and is threatened by habitat loss due to logging. While it was discovered in the 1950s, the Rondo dwarf galago was deemed data deficient until 1996. In 1996, the Rondo dwarf galago was fully described as a species. It is now listed as one of "The World's 25 Most Endangered Primates."

== Description ==
Galagos are small primates with long tails and large ears and eyes. They all have grooming claws, a tooth comb, and a pseudo-tongue. The Rondo dwarf galago can be distinguished from other dwarf galagos by its bottle brush tail. The tail is red in young Rondo dwarf galagos, and darkens with age. It also has a distinctive "double unit rolling call". Two soft units comprise the call. The first is a higher pitch sound that can be repeated up to six times at a constant tempo. This forms a phrase.

== Ecology ==
The diet of the Rondo dwarf galago consists primarily of insects. The species also feeds on fruits and flowers. By clinging to forest life and leaping, the species can feed in the leaf litter and the understory. As nocturnal animals, they build daytime sleeping nests in the canopy. It is assumed that the Rondo dwarf galago gives birth to one or two young per year.

== Habitat ==
The Rondo dwarf galago is typically found in coastal dry forest and scrub in forest patches that are on eastern facing slopes and escarpments.

== Distribution ==
The Rondo dwarf galago is known to live along the coast of Tanzania at elevations between 50 and 900 meters above sea level. It is found specifically in eight isolated and threatened forest patches: Zaraninge Forest within Saadani National Park of Pwani Region, Pande Game Reserve, Pugu/Kazimzumbwe in Kindondoni District of Dar es Salaam Region, Rondo, Litipo, Chitoa, Ruawa and Ziwani Forest Reserves. The total known distribution encompasses an area of 92 km^{2}. The eight subpopulations can be classified into two broad populations, one in southwest Tanzania and the other about 400 km north from there, surrounding Dar es Salaam.
