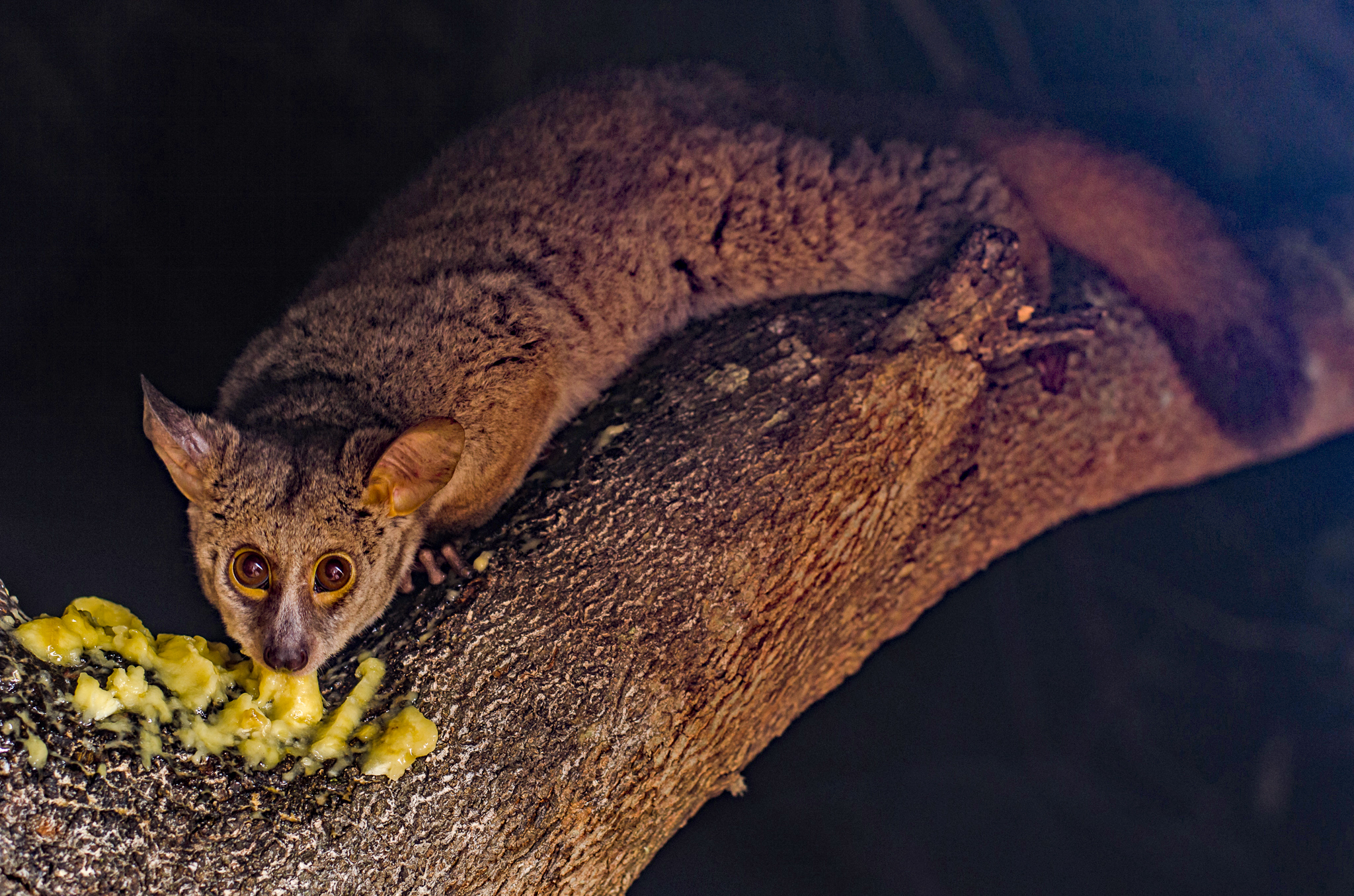
- Brown greater galago (Otolemur crassicaudatus)

Scientific classification
- Kingdom: Animalia
- Phylum: Chordata
- Class: Mammalia
- Order: Primates
- Suborder: Strepsirrhini
- Superfamily: Lorisoidea
- Family: Galagidae; Gray, 1825

Type genus
- Galago Geoffroy, 1796

Genera
- Euoticus; Galago; Galagoides; Laetolia; Otolemur; Paragalago; Sciurocheirus
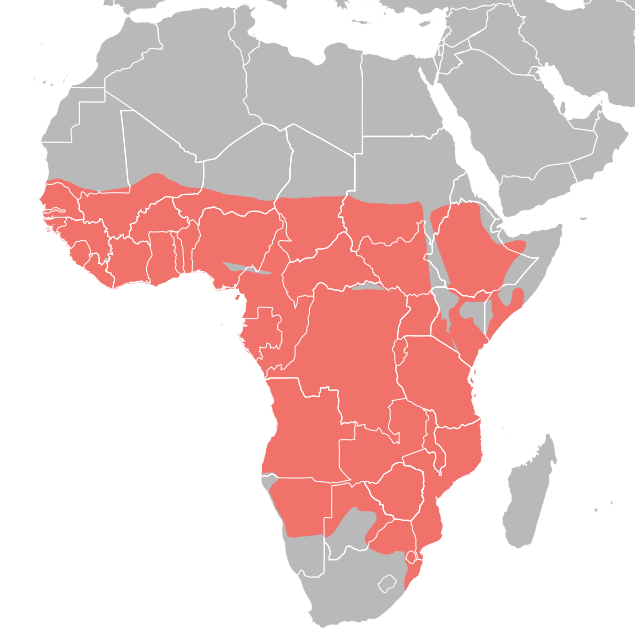
- Galagidae distribution

= Galago =

Galagidae

Family of primates

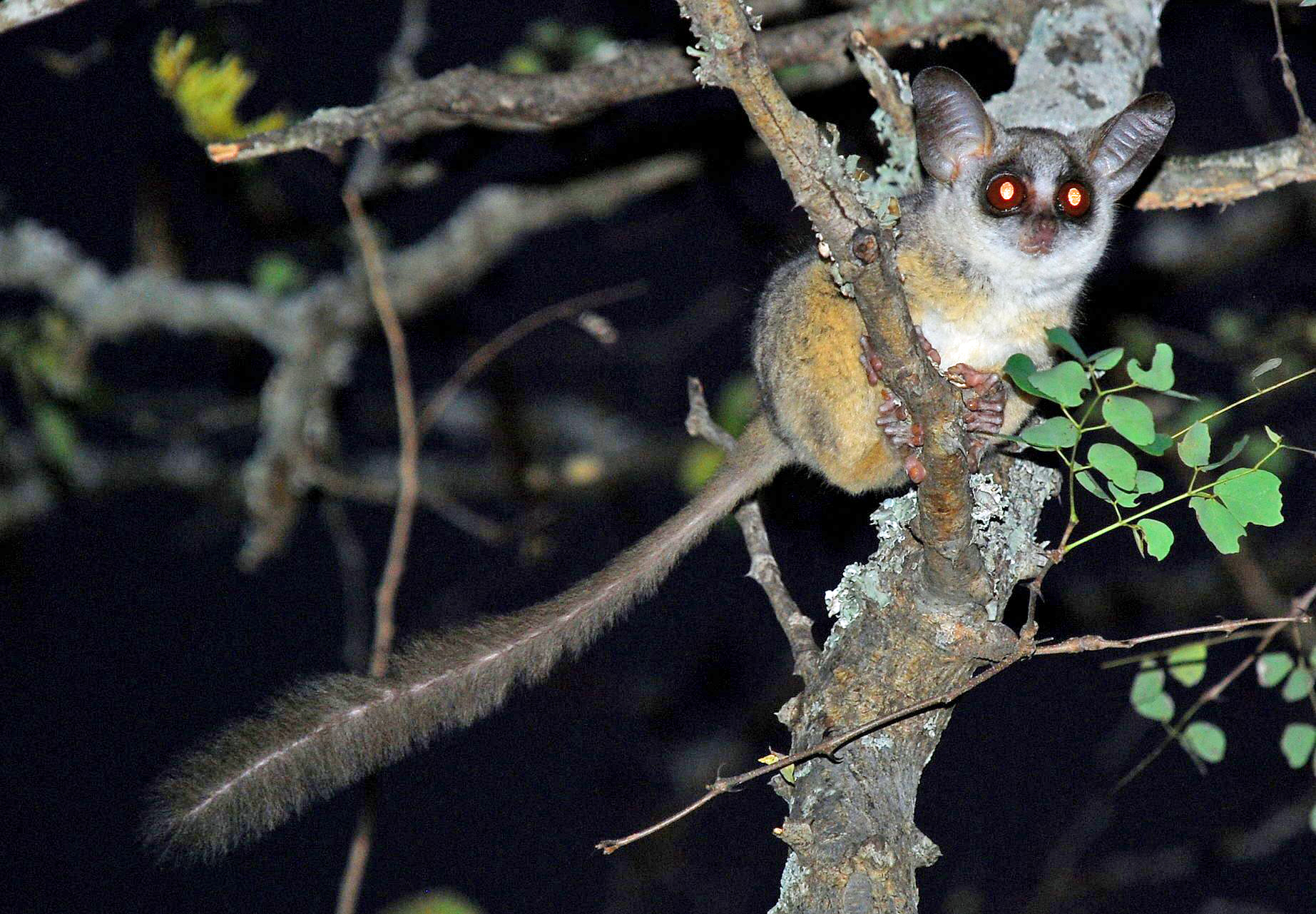
Mohol bushbaby (Galago moholi)

Galagos /ɡəˈleɪɡoʊz/, also known as bush babies or nagapies (meaning "night monkeys" in Afrikaans), are small nocturnal primates native to continental, sub-Saharan Africa, and make up the family Galagidae (also sometimes called Galagonidae). They are considered a sister group of the Lorisidae.

According to some accounts, the name "bush baby" comes from either the animal's cries or its appearance. The Ghanaian name aposor is given to them because of their firm grip on branches.

In both variety and abundance, the bush babies are the most successful strepsirrhine primates in Africa, according to the African Wildlife Foundation.

== Taxonomic classification and phylogeny ==
Galagos are currently grouped into six genera. Euoticus is a basal sister taxon to all the other galagids. The 'dwarf' galagids recently grouped under the genus Galagoides have been found, based on genetic data, and supported by analysis of vocalisations and morphology, to actually consist of two clades, which are not sister taxa, in eastern and western/central Africa (separated by the rift valley). The latter are basal to all the other non-Euoticus galagids. The former group is sister to Galago and has been elevated to full genus status as Paragalago. The genera Otolemur and Sciurocheirus are also sisters.

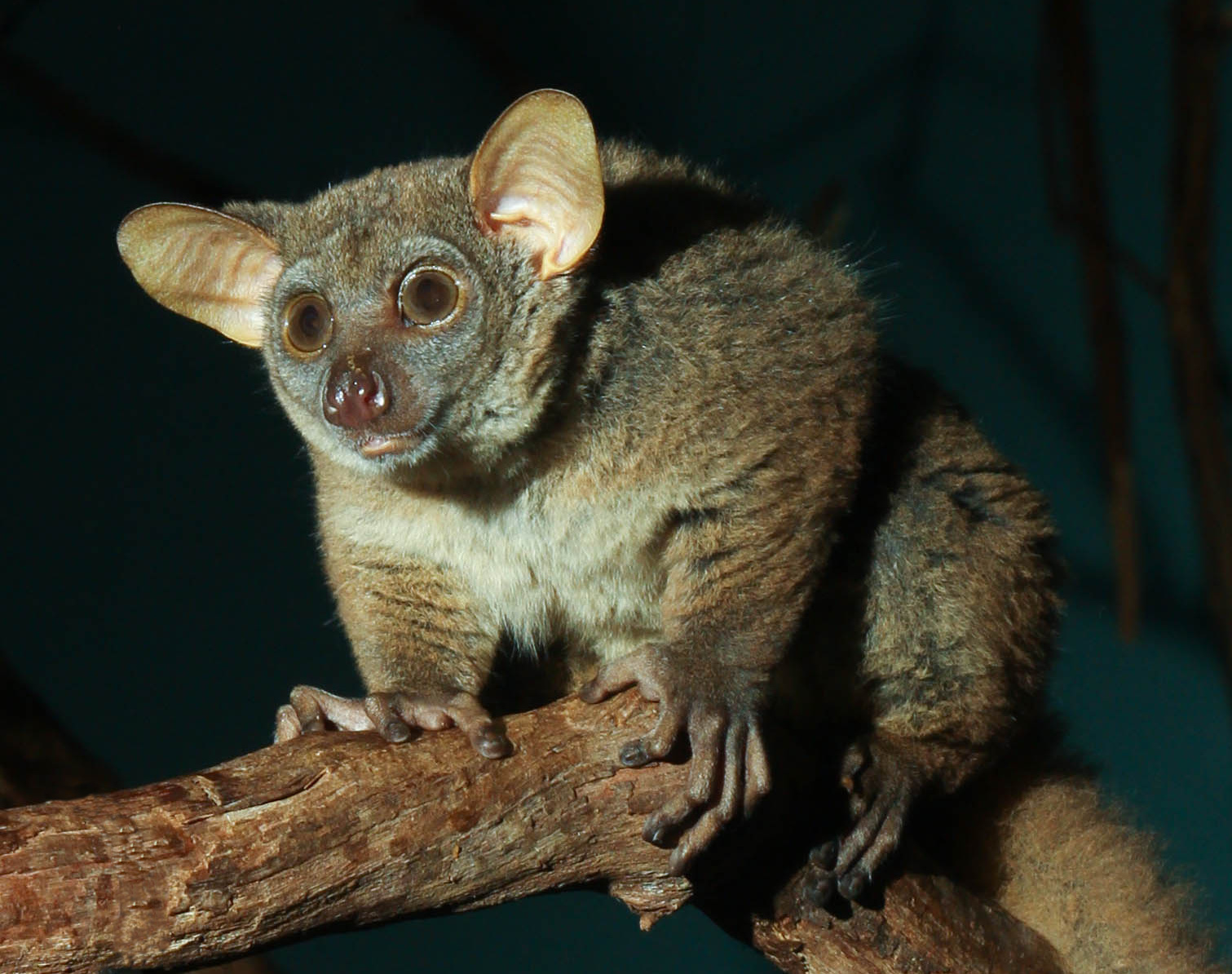
Garnett's galago (Otolemur garnettii)

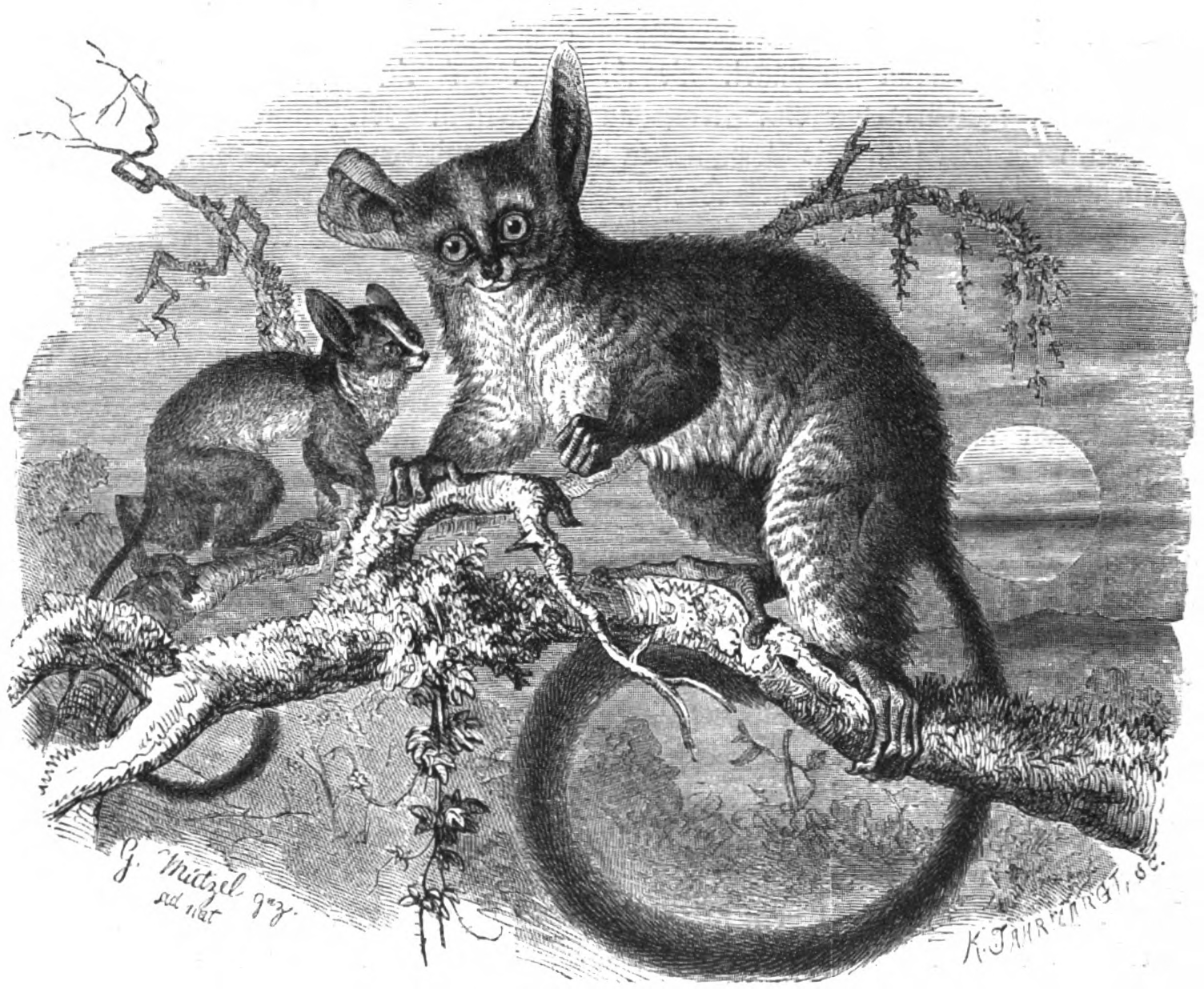
Senegal bushbabies (Galago senegalensis)

Family Galagidae - galagos, or bushbabies

- Genus Euoticus, needle-clawed bushbabies
  - Southern needle-clawed bushbaby, E. elegantulus
  - Northern needle-clawed bushbaby, E. pallidus
- Genus Galago, lesser galagos, or lesser bushbabies
  - Galago senegalensis group
    - Somali bushbaby, G. gallarum
    - Mohol bushbaby, G. moholi
    - Senegal bushbaby, G. senegalensis
  - Galago matschiei group
    - Dusky bushbaby, G. matschiei
- Genus Galagoides, western dwarf galagos
  - Prince Demidoff's bushbaby, Gs. demidovii
  - Angolan dwarf galago, Gs. kumbirensis
  - Thomas's bushbaby, Gs. thomasi
- Genus †Laetolia
  - †Laetolia sadimanensis
- Genus Otolemur, greater galagos, or thick-tailed bushbabies
  - Brown greater galago, O. crassicaudatus
  - Northern greater galago, O. garnettii
  - Silvery greater galago, O. monteiri
- Genus Paragalago, eastern dwarf galagos
  - Paragalago zanzibaricus group
    - Kenya coast galago, P. cocos
    - Grant's bushbaby, P. granti
    - Zanzibar bushbaby, P. zanzibaricus
  - Paragalago orinus group
    - Uluguru bushbaby, P. orinus
    - Rondo bushbaby, P. rondoensis
- Genus †Pliogalago
  - †Pliogalago makahmera
- Genus Sciurocheirus, squirrel galagos
  - Bioko Allen's bushbaby, S. alleni
  - Cross River bushbaby, S. cameronensis
  - Gabon bushbaby, S. gabonensis
  - Makandé squirrel galago, S. makandensis

The phylogeny of Galagidae according to Masters et al., 2017 is as follows:

- Galagidae
  - Euoticus
  - - Galagoides
    - - - Galago
        - Paragalago
      - - Otolemur
        - Sciurocheirus

== Characteristics ==
Galagos have large eyes, allowing them good night vision, in addition to other characteristics, like strong hind limbs, acute hearing, and long tails that help them balance. Their ears are bat-like and allow them to track insects in the dark. They catch insects on the ground or snatch them out of the air. They are fast, agile creatures. As they bound through the thick bushes, they fold their delicate ears back to protect them. They also fold them during rest. They have nails on most of their digits, except for the second toe of the hind foot, which bears a grooming claw. Their diet is a mixture of insects and other small animals, fruit, and tree gums. They have pectinate (comb-like) incisors called toothcombs, and the dental formula: 2.1.3.32.1.3.3 They are active at night.

After a gestation period of 110–133 days, young galagos are born with half-closed eyes and are initially unable to move about independently. After a few (6–8) days, the mother carries the infant in her mouth, and places it on branches while feeding. Females may have singles, twins, or triplets, and may become very aggressive. Each newborn weighs less than one-half ounce (14 g). For the first three days, the infant is kept in constant contact with the mother. The young are fed by the mother for six weeks and can feed themselves at two months. The young grow rapidly, often causing the mother to walk awkwardly as she transports them.

Females maintain a territory shared with their offspring, though males leave their mothers' territories after puberty. Thus social groups consist of closely related females and their young. Adult males maintain separate territories, which overlap with those of the female social groups; generally, one adult male mates with all the females in an area. Males that have not established such territories sometimes form small bachelor groups.

Bush-babies are sometimes kept as pets, and like many other nonhuman primates, they are a likely source of diseases that can cross species barriers. Equally, they are very likely to attract attention from customs officials on importation into many countries. Reports from veterinary and zoological sources indicate captive lifetimes of 12.0 to 16.5 years, suggesting a natural lifetime over a decade.

Galagos communicate by calling to each other and by marking their paths with urine. By following the scent of urine, they can land on exactly the same branch every time. Each species produces a unique set of loud calls that have different functions. One function is to identify individuals as members of a particular species across distances. Scientists can recognize all known galago species by their 'loud calls'. At the end of the night, group members use a special rallying call and gather to sleep in a nest of leaves, a group of branches, or a hole in a tree.

=== Jumping ===
Galagos have remarkable jumping abilities. The highest reliably reported jump for a galago is 2.25 m (7 ft 5 in). According to a study published by the Royal Society, given the body mass of each animal and the fact that the leg muscles amount to about 25% of this, galago's jumping muscles should perform six to nine times better than those of a frog. This is thought to be due to elastic energy storage in tendons of the lower leg, allowing far greater jumps than would otherwise be possible for an animal of their size. In mid-flight, they tuck their arms and legs close to the body; they bring them out at the last second to grab a branch. In a series of leaps, a galago can cover ten yards in mere seconds. The tail, which is longer than the length of the head and body combined, assists the legs in powering the jumps. They may also hop like a kangaroo or simply run or walk on four legs. Such strong, complicated, and coordinated movements are due to the rostral half of the posterior parietal cortex that is linked to the motor, premotor, and visuomotor areas of the frontal cortex.

== Behaviour ==
Generally, the social structure of the galago has components of both social life and solitary life. This can be seen in their play. They swing off branches or climb high and throw things. Social play includes play fights, play grooming, and following-play. During following-play, two galagos jump sporadically and chase each other through the trees. The older galagos in a group prefer to rest alone, while younger ones are in constant contact with one another. This is observed in the Galago garnetti species. Mothers often leave infants alone for long periods and do not try to stop them from leaving. On the other hand, the offspring tries to stay close to, and initiate social interactions with the mother.

Grooming is a very important part of galago daily life. They often groom themselves before, during, and after rest. Social grooming is done more often by males in the group. Females often reject attempts by males to groom them.

== Relationship with humans ==
The name "bush baby" also refers to a myth that is used to scare children into staying indoors at night. Their baby-like cry is most likely the basis of the myth, about a powerful animal that can kidnap humans. It is also said in Nigeria that wild bush babies can never be found dead on plain ground. Rather, they make a nest of sticks, leaves or branches to die in.
