= Uluguru bushbaby =

Conservation status
- Vulnerable (IUCN 3.1)

Scientific classification
- Kingdom: Animalia
- Phylum: Chordata
- Class: Mammalia
- Order: Primates
- Suborder: Strepsirrhini
- Family: Galagidae
- Genus: Paragalago
- Species: P. orinus

Binomial name
- Paragalago orinus (Lawrence & Washburn, 1936)
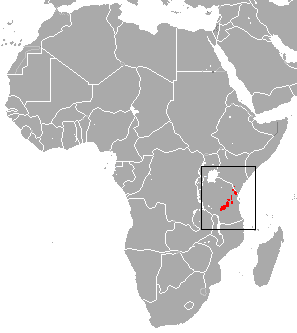
- Uluguru bushbaby range

Synonyms
- Galago demidovii orinus Lawrence & Washburn, 1936

Species of primate

The Uluguru bushbaby (Paragalago orinus), also known as the mountain dwarf galago or the Amani dwarf galago, is a species of primate in the family Galagidae. Like all galagos, it is a strepsirrhine primate. It is endemic to the Eastern Arc Mountains of Kenya and Tanzania at altitudes of 1,200–2,000 m. It has its own set of unique calls, which helps distinguish it from other species of bushbaby.

== Taxonomy ==
Formerly classified as a subspecies of Prince Demidoff's bushbaby, the Uluguru bushbaby was recognised as a separate species in 1995 based on its unique call. It has been closely grouped with the Ukinga galago (not yet formally described) and the Mughese dwarf galago (P. o. mughese) due to their similar calls, overlapping habitual areas and physical resemblance.

== Description ==
The Uluguru bushbaby weighs between 74 and 98 g (2.6 and 3.5 oz) and has head-body length of 125–138 mm (4.9–5.4 in). The tail is relatively short, measuring 169–199 mm (6.7–7.8 in), short-haired, reddish at the base and darker at the tip, and of uniform thickness. The fur is dark reddish, with a yellow-white face strip and dark brown eye rings. The muzzle also appears 'turned up', similar to Prince Demidoff's bushbaby. The hindfoot is very short, measuring around 60 mm (2.4 in) in males.

=== Calls ===
Like most types of bushbabies, the Uluguru bushbaby has its own set of unique calls that distinguishes it from other species. It is most commonly heard at dusk, but the alarm call has been heard throughout the night.

A table showing the different observed types of calls by Galagoides
Name of Call	Description
"Double unit call"	Composed of two soft units. First unit made at a higher pitch than second, and uttered in a series up to six times at a regular tempo to form a phrase. This probably the call Honess (1996) describes as the "repetitive call", but the call heard in the Ulugurus differs due to altering pitch levels. This seems to be the contact/advertisement/territorial-call. Counter-calling often heard; sometimes between three animals (particularly at dawn and dusk).
"Yaps and descending screeches"	Series of phrased "screeches" linked by "yaps" (very short high-pitched units). "Yaps" may be uttered for more than 3 minutes before breaking into "screeches", which only last 5–10 seconds. The entire calling bout may last 5 minutes to over 60 minutes. Used in intense alarm situations (e.g. when a potential predator is spotted). Given at any time during the night.
"Whistled buzz"	Strange, descending "buzz" lasting 1–2 seconds. Sometimes uttered in a descending series or as a start to a series of "yaps" and/or "shrieks" depending on the degree of alarm. 'Buzzes' uttered alone indicate mild alarm, surprise or curiosity, possibly when something unusual is present (e.g. torchlight).
"Grunt shriek"	Quiet, low pitch, low volume call made by swallowing air rapidly while simultaneously uttering screeches. This call usually implies extreme alarm (due to the considerable physical effort used to make this call).
"Yap"	Very short high pitched call. Usually uttered in series and in conjunction with other calls like "screeches" and "buzzes". Made in a variety of contexts from mild alarm to extreme alarm. The rapidity, frequency and amplitude usually increases with the degree of alarm.
"High pitch squeak"	Very high pitch call uttered singly, or in series of 2–3 units, or breaking into "screeches". Often given high in the canopy. Unclear in what behavioural context this call is made.

== Conservation ==
The Uluguru bushbaby is classified by the IUCN as vulnerable, with the population being widespread, but fragmented, often found at low densities. Overall extent of occurrence appears to be declining. The main threats are deforestation, most commonly for logging and conversion into agricultural land. The species is present in multiple protected areas that have been established to combat deforestation, such as Udzungwa Mountains National Park and the Taita Hills forest reserve.

The species is listed in Appendix II of CITES.

=== Presence of the Uluguru bushbaby in the Taita Hills ===
The Taita Hills have become a big point of interest in Kenya due to its unusually high density of endangered species, though due to human influences the indigenous forests are now highly fragmented and the remaining areas of forest are small.

However, despite the large amount of biodiversity within the Taita Hills, no surveys of bushbabies have ever been undertaken, so for a long time, the actual presence of the Uluguru bushbaby within this mountain range was unknown. However, as time passed and more species of bushbaby were discovered and made their own taxon (Largely due to extensive research into their vocalisations, reproductive anatomy and genetics), as well as the fact that the presence of the Uluguru bushbaby was already known around some parts of Tanzania (Particularly at other parts of the Eastern Arc Mountains, which the Taita Hills, along with Mount Sagala and Mount Kasigau, make up the north-easternmost part of, their presence had been realised, along with two other species of bushbaby (Paragalago rondoensis and Paragalago udzungwensis). It is possible that these observations may be of a new subspecies of the Uluguru bushbaby, being names the Taita dwarf mountain galago, however this has not been formally identified.
