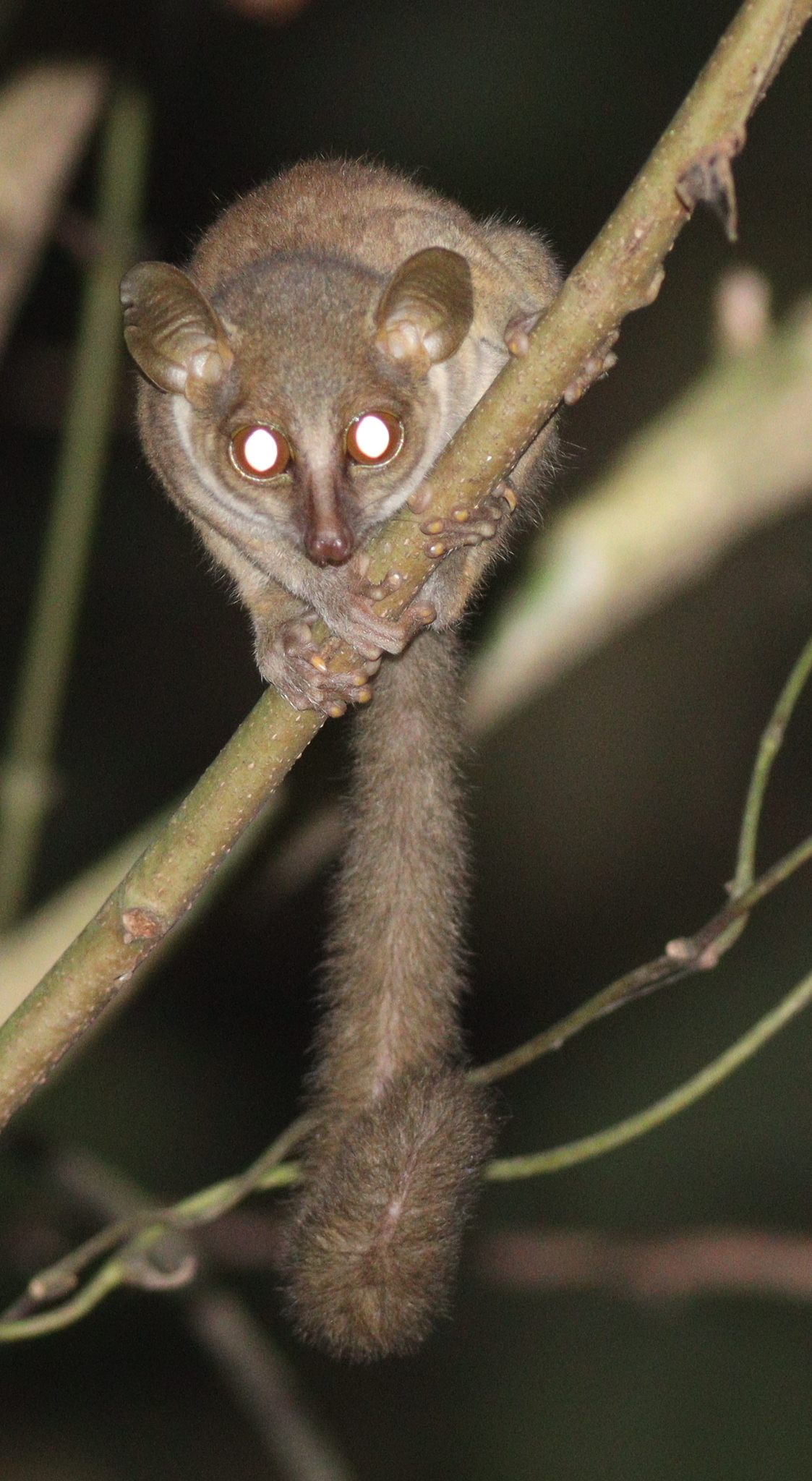

Conservation status
- Least Concern (IUCN 3.1)

Scientific classification
- Kingdom: Animalia
- Phylum: Chordata
- Class: Mammalia
- Order: Primates
- Suborder: Strepsirrhini
- Family: Galagidae
- Genus: Galagoides
- Species: G. thomasi

Binomial name
- Galagoides thomasi Elliot, 1907
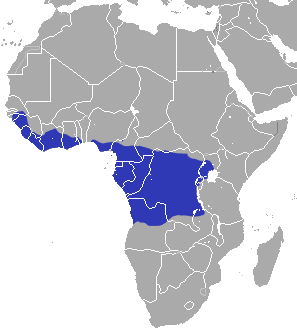
- Thomas's bushbaby range

= Thomas's bushbaby =

Species of primate

Thomas's bushbaby (Galagoides thomasi) is a species of primate in the family Galagidae. It is found in Angola, Burundi, Cameroon, Democratic Republic of the Congo, Equatorial Guinea, Gabon, Kenya, Nigeria, Rwanda, Tanzania, Uganda, and Zambia.
