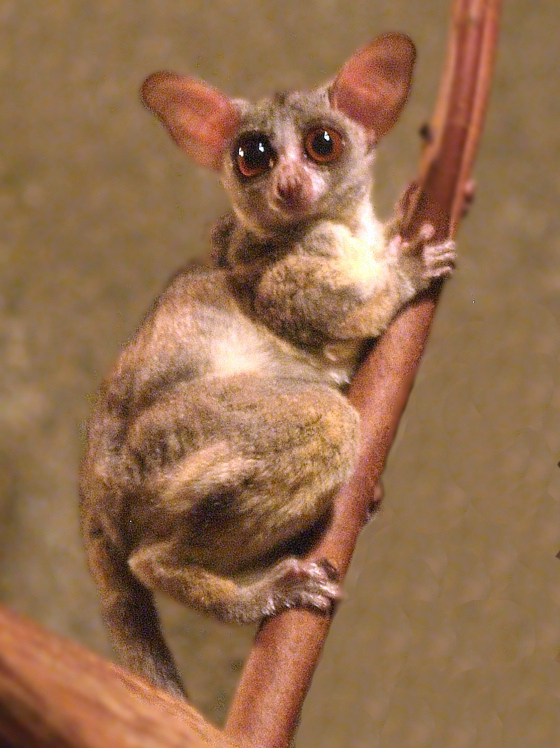

Conservation status
- Least Concern (IUCN 3.1)

Scientific classification
- Kingdom: Animalia
- Phylum: Chordata
- Class: Mammalia
- Order: Primates
- Suborder: Strepsirrhini
- Family: Galagidae
- Genus: Galago
- Species: G. senegalensis

Binomial name
- Galago senegalensis É. Geoffroy, 1796
- Distribution of the Senegal Bushbaby Possible range or accidental records

= Senegal bushbaby =

Species of primate

The Senegal bushbaby (Galago senegalensis), also known as the Senegal galago, the lesser galago or the lesser bush baby, is a small, nocturnal primate, a member of the galago family Galagidae.

The name "bush baby" may come either from the animals' cries or from their appearance. They are agile leapers, and run swiftly along branches. They live in Africa south of the Sahara and nearby islands, including Zanzibar. They tend to live in dry woodland regions and savannah regions. They are small primates (130 mm and 95–300 grams) with woolly thick fur that ranges from silvery grey to dark brown. They have large eyes, giving them good night vision; strong hind limbs; and long tails, which help them balance. Their ears are made up of four segments that can bend back individually, to aid their hearing when hunting insects at night. Their omnivorous diet is a mixture of other small animals, including birds and insects, fruit, seeds, flowers, eggs, nuts, and tree gums.

A Senegal bushbaby, at an aquarium in Tokyo, looks around carefully.

Bushbabies reproduce twice a year, at the beginning of the rains (November) and the end (February). They are polygynous, and the females raise their young in nests made from leaves. They have 1–2 babies per litter, with gestation period being 110–120 days. Bush babies are born with half-closed eyes, unable to move about independently. After a few days, the mother carries the infant in her mouth, and leaves it on convenient branches while feeding.

Adult females maintain territories, but share them with their offspring. Males leave their mothers' territories after puberty, but females remain, forming social groups consisting of closely related females and their immature young. Adult males maintain separate territories, which overlap with those of the female social groups; generally, one adult male mates with all the females in an area. Males who have not established such territories sometimes form small bachelor groups.

Bush babies communicate both by calling to each other and by marking their paths with their urine. At the end of the night, group members use a special rallying call and gather to sleep in a nest made of leaves, in a group of branches, or in a hole in a tree.

== Predation by chimpanzees ==
A 2007 study of the Western chimpanzee in Täi forest, Ivory Coast, revealed that local females, young males, young females and infant chimps hunt the Senegal bushbaby using fashioned spears. When a bushbaby roost was found, the chimps broke a branch from a nearby tree and sharpened the end using their teeth. They would then rapidly and repeatedly stab the branch into the roost. After successly killing the bushbaby they reached into or smashed the roost, retrieved the body of the bushbaby and ate it. This method was observed to be successful only once in five attempts for a young female. In Fongoli, Senegal, Senegal bushbabies account for 75% of females' prey and 47% of the males'.

== Subspecies ==
There are four subspecies of the Senegal bushbaby:

- Galago senegalensis senegalensis (Senegal lesser galago)
- Galago senegalensis braccatus (Kenya lesser galago)
- Galago senegalensis sotikae (Uganda lesser galago)
- Galago senegalensis dunni (Ethiopia lesser galago)
