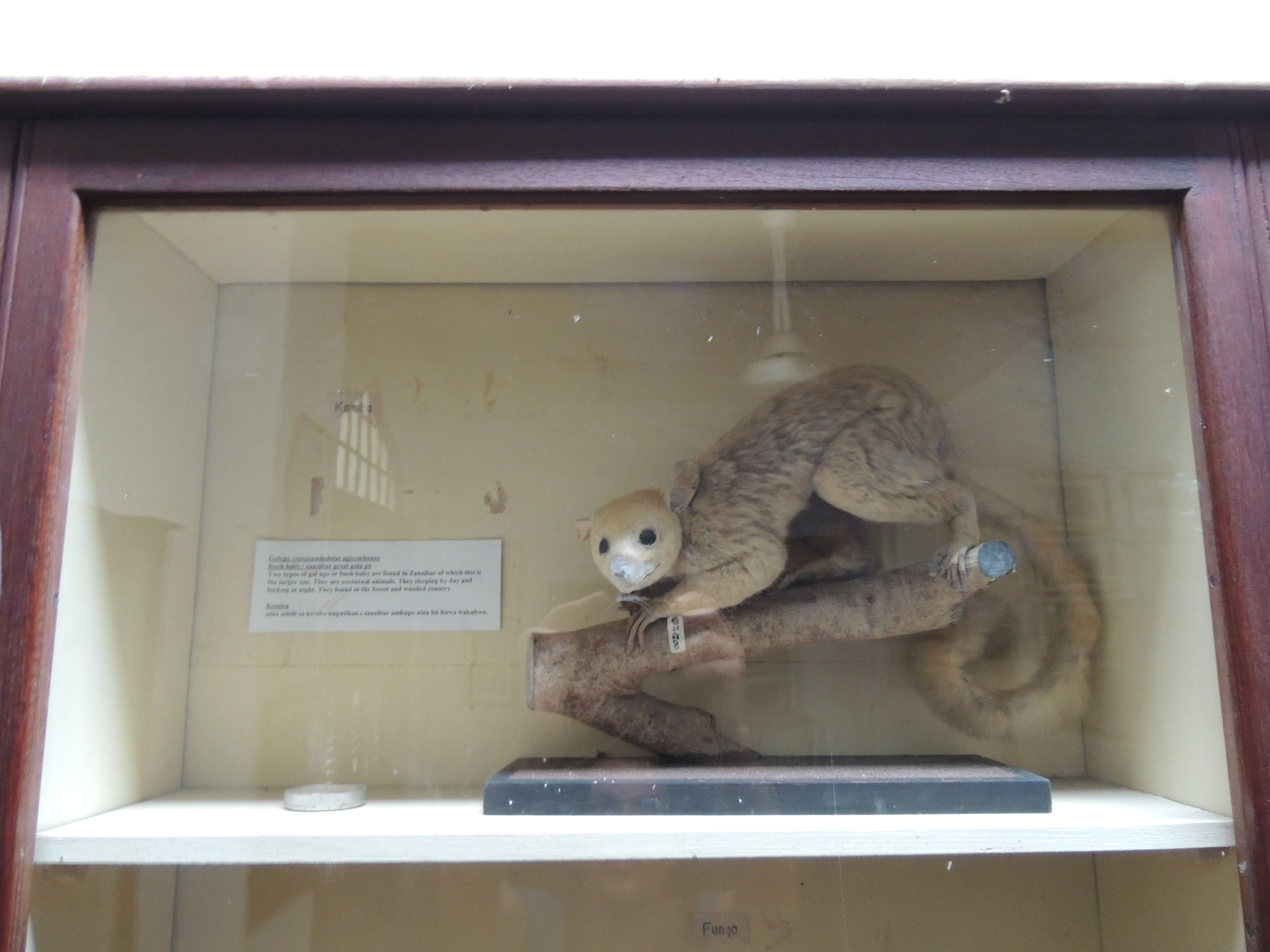

Conservation status
- Near Threatened (IUCN 3.1)

Scientific classification
- Kingdom: Animalia
- Phylum: Chordata
- Class: Mammalia
- Order: Primates
- Suborder: Strepsirrhini
- Family: Galagidae
- Genus: Paragalago
- Species: P. zanzibaricus

Binomial name
- Paragalago zanzibaricus (Matschie, 1893)
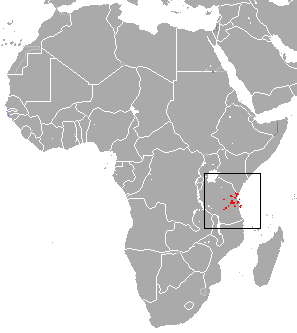
- Zanzibar bushbaby range

Synonyms
- Galago zanzibaricus Matschie, 1893

= Zanzibar bushbaby =

Species of primate

The Zanzibar bushbaby, Matundu dwarf galago, Udzungwa bushbaby, or Zanzibar galago (Paragalago zanzibaricus) is a primate of the family Galagidae. An adult typically weighs 150 grams (5.3 oz), its head-body length is 14 to 15 centimetres (5.5 to 5.9 in) and its tail is between 12 and 15 centimetres (4.7 and 5.9 in) long. Like other species of galagos, its diet consists mainly of fruit, insects, and tree gums.

It is the most widespread and abundant bushbaby in the coastal forests of Tanzania. It is thought to prefer the mid to high canopy of tropical coastal forest, submontane and lowland tropical forest. It has one or two young per year.

There are two subspecies of this bushbaby:

- P. z. zanzibaricus, from Zanzibar
- P. z. udzungwensis, from mainland Tanzania
