= Pariente's fork-marked lemur =

Conservation status
- Endangered (IUCN 3.1)
- CITES Appendix I

Scientific classification
- Kingdom: Animalia
- Phylum: Chordata
- Class: Mammalia
- Infraclass: Placentalia
- Order: Primates
- Suborder: Strepsirrhini
- Family: Cheirogaleidae
- Genus: Phaner
- Species: P. parienti

Binomial name
- Phaner parienti Groves & Tattersall, 1991
- Pariente's fork-crowned lemur range

Species of lemur

Pariente's fork-marked lemur (Phaner parienti), or the Sambirano fork-marked lemur, is a species of lemur endemic to the Sambirano region of north-western Madagascar. This lemur has light brown to gray upperparts, a prominent facial fork and dorsal stripe that runs from the tail's tip to the point where it splits on the lemur's head to rejoin at the nose, and a white-tipped tail. It is found in lowland and mid-altitude humid forests and is nocturnal. It is an omnivore, eating tree gum, sap, bud exudes, insects and larvae. It sleeps in nests that have been abandoned by other lemurs, particularly Coquerel's giant mouse lemur. This species is relatively unknown, though it is threatened by habitat destruction. It was previously considered a subspecies of the Masoala fork-marked lemur (Phaner furcifer). It is listed on CITES Appendix I.
