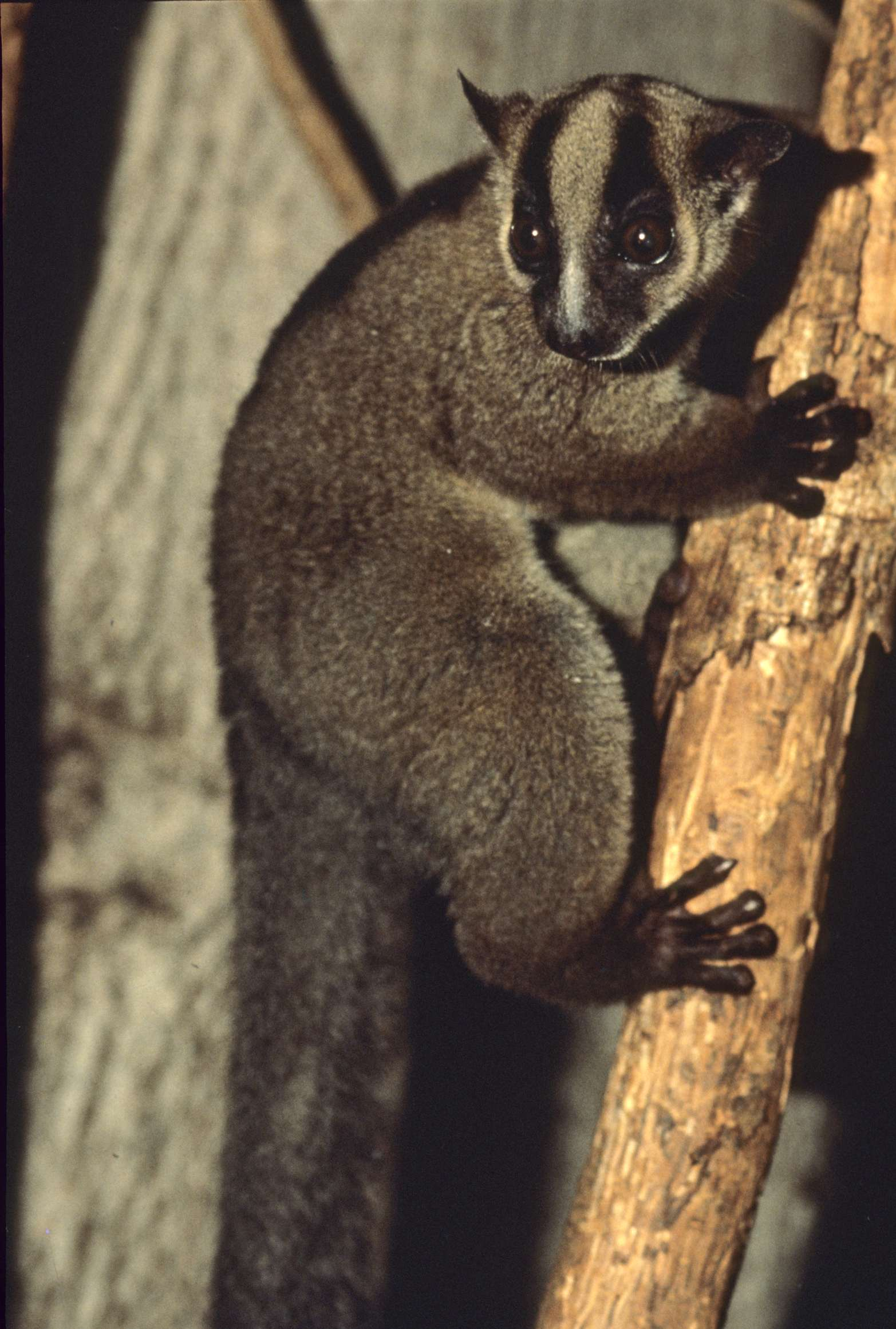

Conservation status
- Endangered (IUCN 3.1)
- CITES Appendix I (CITES)

Scientific classification
- Kingdom: Animalia
- Phylum: Chordata
- Class: Mammalia
- Order: Primates
- Suborder: Strepsirrhini
- Family: Cheirogaleidae
- Genus: Phaner
- Species: P. pallescens

Binomial name
- Phaner pallescens Groves & Tattersall, 1991
- Pale fork-marked lemur range

= Pale fork-marked lemur =

Species of lemur

The pale fork-marked lemur (Phaner pallescens), or western fork-marked lemur, is a species of lemur known from western Madagascar; south of the Fiherenana River to the region of Soalala. It is said to be the smallest fork-marked species. It is listed on CITES Appendix I as Endangered. They are about 9–11 in (230–280 mm) long from head to rump and their tail adds another 11–15 in (280–380 mm). Pale fork-marked lemur's weigh around 11–18 oz (310–510 g)

Pale fork-marked lemurs live up to around 12 years in captivity. Their chances of surviving to that age is suspected to decrease when in the wild.

== Behavior ==
Pale fork-marked lemurs are nocturnal animals. They live in pairs but partners spend about 75% of their activity time apart, and females mate with several males. Pair relationships are strained, with rates of combative interactions up to four times greater than affiliative interactions. This is likely due to intense feeding competition.

Mothers of juveniles make a bleating call resembling that of a goat. Researchers have also identified a fighting call, a low-contact call accompanying locomotion, field location calls, and a call admitted exclusively by males.

Calls emitted by males or females may be answered with kius by group members and neighbors, sometimes yielding a chorus spreading across the area... Partners do not always answer each other's calls. During meetings of neighbors and overlapping areas of territories, up to 10 individuals may come together and call.

Males scent-mark social partners as well as substrates. Feces and urine are not used for scent marking. Females rub their genitals on substrates in males use throat gland excretions.
