= Amber Mountain fork-marked lemur =

Conservation status
- Endangered (IUCN 3.1)
- CITES Appendix I

Scientific classification
- Kingdom: Animalia
- Phylum: Chordata
- Class: Mammalia
- Infraclass: Placentalia
- Order: Primates
- Suborder: Strepsirrhini
- Family: Cheirogaleidae
- Genus: Phaner
- Species: P. electromontis

Binomial name
- Phaner electromontis Groves & Tattersall, 1991
- Amber Mountain fork-marked lemur range

Species of lemur

The Amber Mountain fork-marked lemur (Phaner electromontis), also known as the Montagne d'Ambre fork-crowned lemur or Tanta, is a small primate, and like the other lemurs, can only be found on the island of Madagascar. The species is named after the Amber Mountain National Park where they are found.

== Description ==
The Amber Mountain fork-marked lemur is light grey on the dorsal and ventral areas of its body, with a thick, dark crown, dorsal midline stripe, and tail, as well as its hands and feet.

No official body measurements have been published for the Amber Mountain fork-marker lemur, however unpublished research by E. E. Louis Jr suggests that three of the species (2 male 1 female) from Montagne d'Ambre had an average head-body length of 27.2 cm (±0.4 cm), a tail length o-34.4 cm (±0.2 cm), and an average weight of 387g (±35g).

The species is similar to several other nocturnal lemurs, including Microcebus, Cheirogaleus, and Lepilemur, however they are mainly differentiated from Microcebus by its difference in size, and from all else the forked pattern on the crown, the very loud and distinctive vocalizations, and the unusual head-bobbing movements.

== Habitat ==
The Amber Mountain fork-marked lemur lives in north Madagascar, in the regions of Montagne d'Ambre and Ankarana, specifically in the Montagne d'Ambre National Park, and is also present in Ankarana National Park, two special reserves (Analamerana and Forêt d'Ambre), and in the Sahafary Classified Forest. A group of lemurs in the genus Phaner have been spotted in Dariana, however it has not been identified as to whether it belongs to the species Electromontis, or, more likely, is an entirely new species.

The Amber Mountain fork-marked lemur mainly inhabits both the wet and dry forest.

== Conservation ==
According to the IUCN, the Amber Mountain fork-marked lemur is vulnerable. Its most prominent threat is the annual burning of its habitat. However, population densities are thought to be high within the Montagne d'Ambre region, though the species has not been studied in-depth. It is listed in CITES Appendix I.
