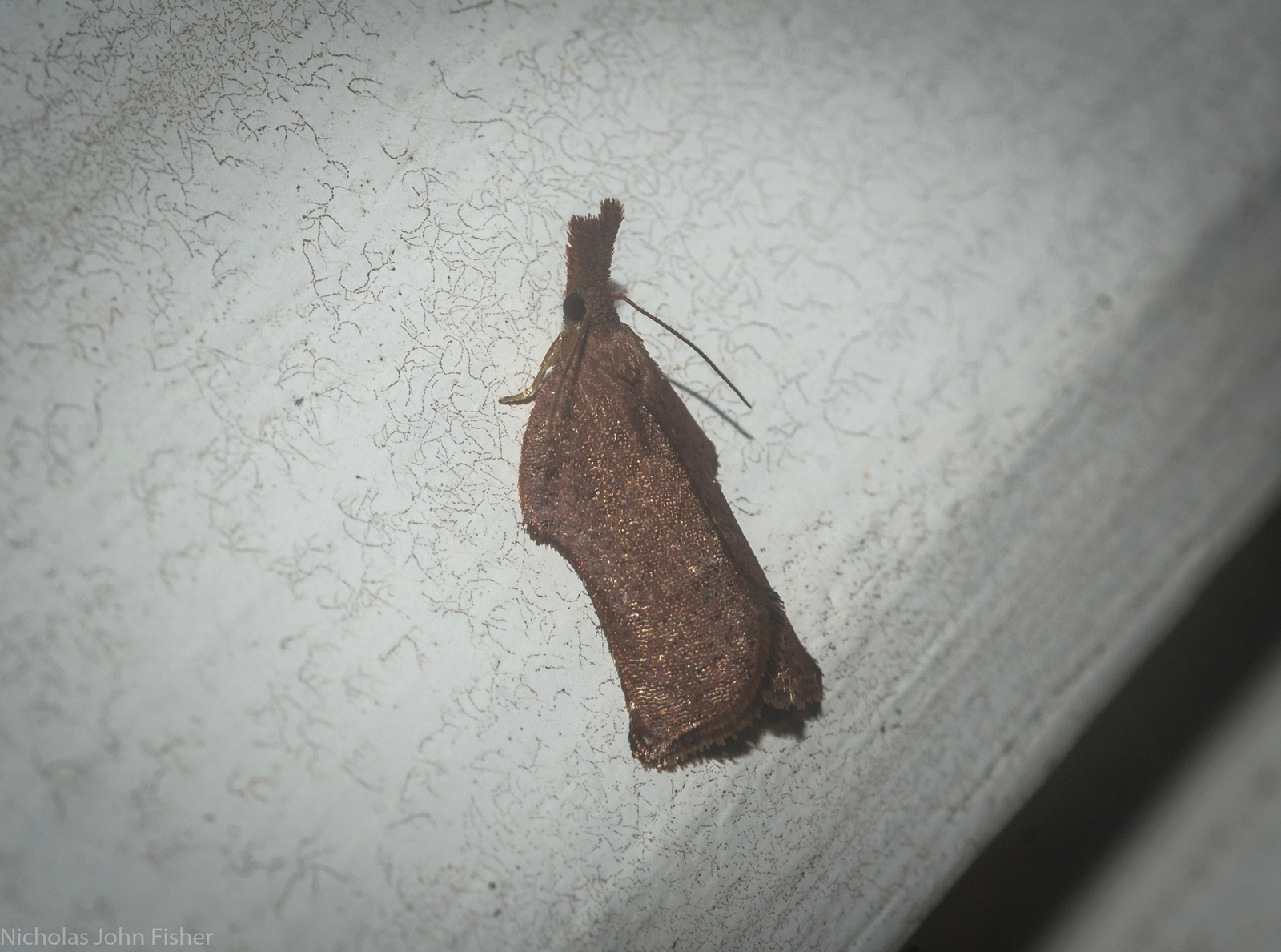

Scientific classification
- Domain: Eukaryota
- Kingdom: Animalia
- Phylum: Arthropoda
- Class: Insecta
- Order: Lepidoptera
- Family: Tortricidae
- Genus: Coeloptera
- Species: C. vulpina

Binomial name
- Coeloptera vulpina (Turner, 1916)

Synonyms
- Capua vulpina Turner, 1916; Coeloptera castanina Turner, 1945; Capua rhynchota Turner, 1945

= Coeloptera vulpina =

Species of moth

Coeloptera vulpina is a species of moth of the family Tortricidae. It is found in Australia, where it has been recorded from New South Wales and Queensland.

The wingspan is about 12 mm. The forewings are fuscous, with a dull purplish gloss, suffused (except near the base) with reddish brown. The hindwings are whitish, strigulated (finely streaked) with whitish grey.
