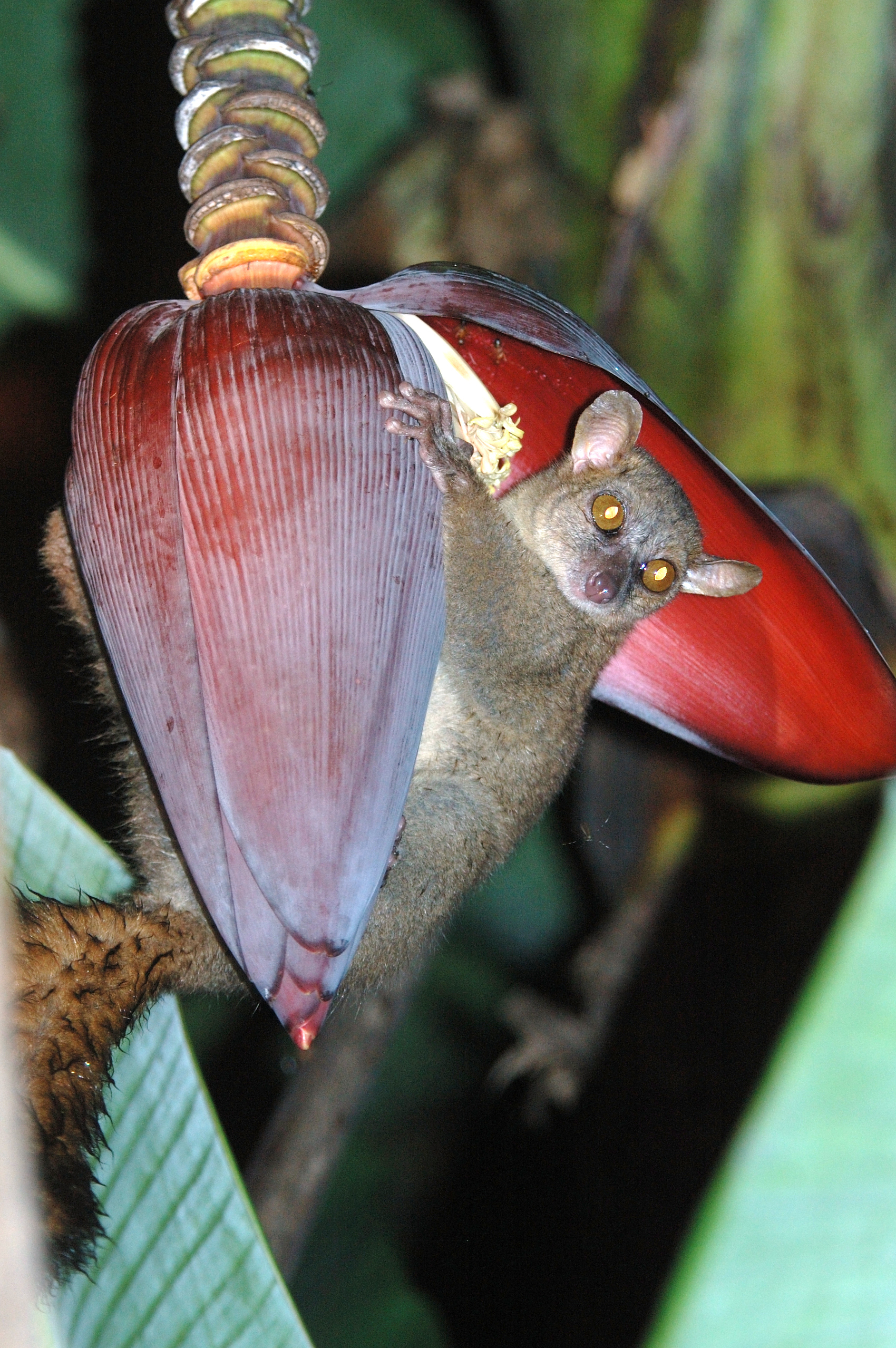

Conservation status
- Vulnerable (IUCN 3.1)
- CITES Appendix I

Scientific classification
- Kingdom: Animalia
- Phylum: Chordata
- Class: Mammalia
- Infraclass: Placentalia
- Order: Primates
- Suborder: Strepsirrhini
- Family: Cheirogaleidae
- Genus: Mirza
- Species: M. zaza

Binomial name
- Mirza zaza Kappeler & Roos, 2005
- Northern giant mouse lemur range

= Northern giant mouse lemur =

Species of lemur

The northern giant mouse lemur (Mirza zaza), or northern dwarf lemur, is a species of lemur discovered in 2005. They are part of the primate order, and classified in the family Cheirogaleidae. Previously, both populations of giant mouse lemurs were believed to belong to one species. The northern giant mouse lemurs are small nocturnal lemurs endemic to Madagascar. They weigh about 300 grams (11 oz), and have long, bushy tails and relatively small ears. Their large testicles are an indication of their promiscuous copulation system. These lemurs have been found to use communal sleeping nests including multiple males, which is an uncommon behaviour in lemurs.

== Etymology ==
The word zaza means child in Malagasy. The name was chosen because the northern giant mouse lemur is the smaller of the two giant mouse lemur species, and because of a wish to emphasize the responsibility of the current generation of Malagasy children for the conservation of Malagasy animals for future generations.

== Description ==
The northern giant mouse lemur is relatively small, with juveniles weighing 150–199 g (5.3–7.0 oz), subadults 200–249 g (7.1–8.8 oz), and fully grown adults 250–300 g (8.8–10.6 oz). This species has large testes, among the largest relative testes to body size in the Primate order.

== Distribution ==
M. zaza are found in a strictly limited region in the north-western part of Madagascar, the Ampasindava peninsula. The habitat is split by two rivers, the Mahavavy River to the north and the Maevarano River to the south. In some areas it is further separated by the Sambirano River. This area in Madagascar has a dry and cool season from May to October, and a wet and hot season from November to April. The species can be found in a transition zone which goes to the Sambirano evergreen rainforest that extends to the north. Home ranges cover 0.52– 2.34 ha. There is no substantial overlap in home ranges among individuals. An estimated 385–1,086 individuals per km^{2} are present throughout the region.

== Behavior ==
The species has a polygynandrous mating system, likely based on the large size of the testes, which engenders strong sperm competition. Breeding is aseasonal.

The northern mouse lemur is nocturnal, feeding predominantly during the second half of the night. On average, individuals stay approximately 7 metres (23 ft) up in the canopy. During the day they sleep in group-exclusive tree holes. Nesting groups are 2–8 individuals in size, made up of both sexes and any age class, and include unrelated males.

== Conservation ==
The species is classified as vulnerable by the IUCN primarily due to loss of habitat. The deciduous forests that they live in are being logged, fragmented, and degraded. The species is listed in CITES Appendix I.
