= Coeloptera gyrobathra =

Scientific classification
- Domain: Eukaryota
- Kingdom: Animalia
- Phylum: Arthropoda
- Class: Insecta
- Order: Lepidoptera
- Family: Tortricidae
- Genus: Coeloptera
- Species: C. gyrobathra

Binomial name
- Coeloptera gyrobathra (Turner, 1925)

Synonyms
- Capua gyrobathra Turner, 1925

Species of moth

Coeloptera gyrobathra is a species of moth of the family Tortricidae. It is found in Australia, where it has been recorded from Queensland.

The wingspan is about 21 mm. The forewings are pale brown, with a whitish costal edge with fine short fuscous strigulae (fine streaks). The hindwings are grey.
