= Coeloptera epiloma =

Scientific classification
- Domain: Eukaryota
- Kingdom: Animalia
- Phylum: Arthropoda
- Class: Insecta
- Order: Lepidoptera
- Family: Tortricidae
- Genus: Coeloptera
- Species: C. epiloma

Binomial name
- Coeloptera epiloma (Lower, 1902)

Synonyms
- Capua epiloma Lower, 1902

Species of moth

Coeloptera epiloma is a species of moth of the family Tortricidae. It is found in Australia, where it has been recorded from New South Wales, Victoria and Tasmania.

Adults have been recorded on wing from November to January.
