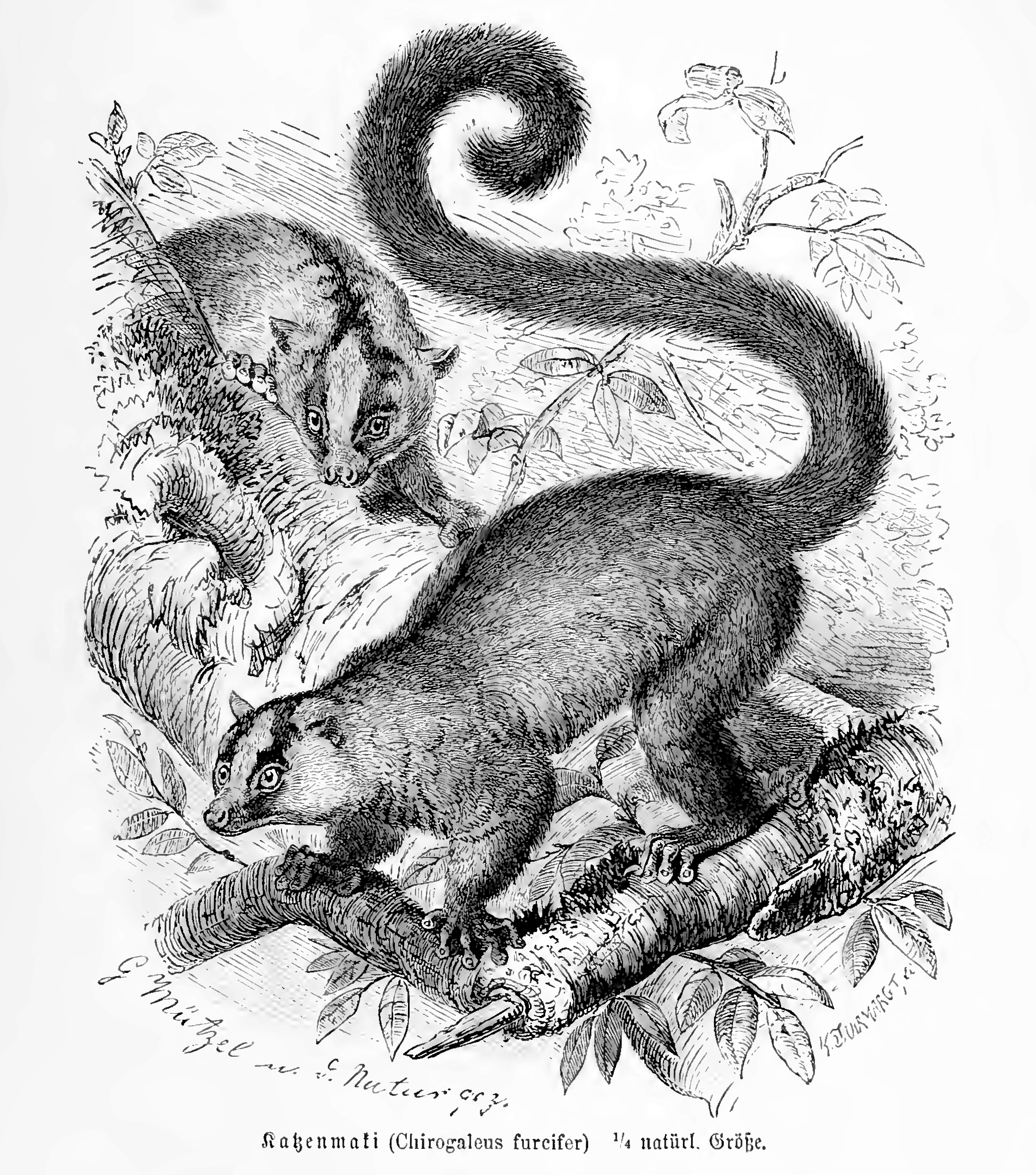

Conservation status
- Endangered (IUCN 3.1)
- CITES Appendix I

Scientific classification
- Kingdom: Animalia
- Phylum: Chordata
- Class: Mammalia
- Infraclass: Placentalia
- Order: Primates
- Suborder: Strepsirrhini
- Family: Cheirogaleidae
- Genus: Phaner
- Species: P. furcifer

Binomial name
- Phaner furcifer Blainville, 1839
- Masoala fork-marked lemur range

= Masoala fork-marked lemur =

Species of lemur

The Masoala fork-marked lemur (Phaner furcifer), also known as the eastern fork-marked lemur or Masoala fork-crowned lemur, is a species of lemur found in the coastal forests of northeastern Madagascar. It is a small nocturnal animal with large eyes, greyish fur and a long tail.

P. furcifer is a specialist feeder on the gum that exudes from insect holes on the surface of certain trees, but it supplements its gum diet with insect prey. This primate is monogamous and a single offspring is born in November or December. It is declining in numbers due to habitat destruction, and the International Union for Conservation of Nature has assessed its conservation status as being endangered.

== Description ==
The Masoala fork-marked lemur is so-called because the black stripe along its spine divides on the crown, the two forks continuing on either side of the head to the eye and along either side of the muzzle. The rest of the pelage is some shade of reddish or brownish grey. The head-and-body length is in the range 227 to 285 mm (9 to 11 in), with a tail of 285 to 370 mm (11 to 15 in). This lemur typically weighs between 300 and 500 g (11 and 18 oz).

== Distribution and habitat ==
This lemur is endemic to northeastern Madagascar. Its range extends from the Masoala Peninsula southwards to Toamasina and it is present at altitudes up to about 1,000 m (3,300 ft). It occurs in moist lowland forests.

== Ecology ==
The social system of the Masoala fork-marked lemur has been described as pre-gregarious. Some adults live as monogamous couples, sharing the same nest hole by day but moving about independently for at least part of the night (the male often follows a few metres behind the female), but a few live as solitary bachelors or have ranges overlapping more than one female. The average size of a female territory is 4 hectares (9.9 acres) with a male territory averaging 3.8 hectares (9.4 acres). The lemurs sometimes gather at the places where the territories overlap; there is no aggression on these occasions, but much vocalisation for a period of ten or twenty minutes. The animal moves on all fours, running rapidly along branches, climbing and jumping, mostly at a few metres above the ground, but descending to the forest floor on occasion.

The diet consists mainly of the natural gum of trees in temperate deciduous forests. The Masoala fork-marked lemur has become specialized for harvesting this substance. Like most lemuriform primates, it has a toothcomb; in Phaner species, the toothcomb has evolved to be more robust and is used to scrape the gum that exudes from holes on a tree made by insects. This structure consists of a row of lower incisors that are long and forward pointing. The favoured food sources are trees in the genus Terminalia, but certain other tree species also provide gum, including Adansonia spp., and the buds of Zanthoxylum tsihanimposa. Certain beetle larvae burrow just under the bark of Terminalia and leave characteristic galleries that ooze gum. This lemur has also been observed licking the flowers of Crateva greveana, and feeding on a "syrup" produced by insect larvae on thin branches of Rhopalocarpus lucidus trees.

This species is nocturnal and has a territory containing about three exclusive Terminalia trees and access to about nine more in overlapping territories. The animal emerges at dusk from its sleeping hole in a large tree such as a baobab, or the abandoned nest of a Coquerel's giant mouse lemur (Mirza coquereli), moving directly to each Terminalia tree in turn, feeding on the gum and moving on to the next tree. It has a complex itinerary which it regularly follows, and later in the night it visits other less-favoured gum-sources and returns to the previously visited trees and gleans any gum it has missed. The same Terminalia trees are exploited by day by a bird, the crested coua (Coua cristata), which also feeds on gum.

Gum is low in nitrogen content, and the Masoala fork-marked lemur needs to supplement its diet with animal prey, which it stalks on the tree bark and among the foliage, catching it with its hands and stuffing it into its mouth. Hunting takes place late in the night when the main gum-gathering activities are over. The animal's faeces are invariably found to contain fragments of insect chitin. In captivity this lemur was found to be very selective about what it ate, rejecting grasshoppers, beetle larvae and small lizards, but feeding avidly on a large moth and a praying mantis.

The male and female are in frequent vocal communication throughout the night, but this species in unusual among nocturnal lemurs in not communicating through olfactory signals, and the urine and faeces are allowed to drop to the forest floor. A large cutaneous gland on the throat of the male is used during social grooming when males, females and juveniles groom each other, and the male may rub the gland on the female. The female comes into estrus for three to four days in June, giving birth to a single offspring in November or December. This remains in the nesting hole of the parents at first, but as it gets older it is carried by the mother, clinging to her underside, and when it gets larger, to her back.

== Status ==
The P. furcifer population is suspected of being in decline as its forest habitat is being destroyed by timber harvesting and slash-and-burn agriculture. It is listed on Appendix I of CITES, and receives some protection from being present in several national parks, but the International Union for Conservation of Nature has assessed its conservation status as being endangered.
