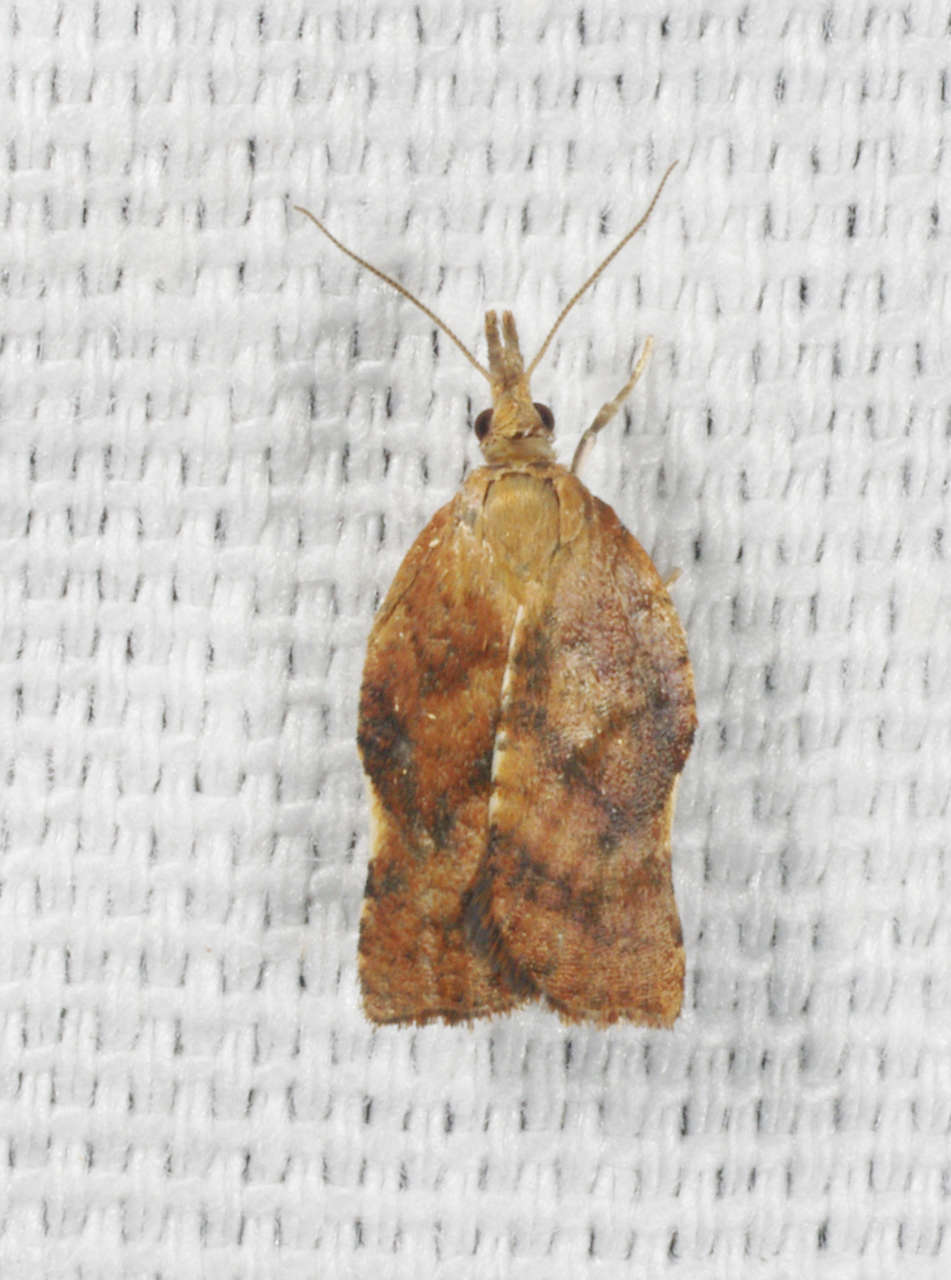
- Coeloptera sp.

Scientific classification
- Domain: Eukaryota
- Kingdom: Animalia
- Phylum: Arthropoda
- Class: Insecta
- Order: Lepidoptera
- Family: Tortricidae
- Tribe: Archipini
- Genus: Coeloptera; Turner, 1945

= Coeloptera =

Genus of tortrix moths

Coeloptera is a genus of moths belonging to the subfamily Tortricinae of the family Tortricidae.

== Species ==
- Coeloptera epiloma (Lower, 1902)
- Coeloptera gyrobathra (Turner, 1925)
- Coeloptera vulpina (Turner, 1916)

== See also ==
- List of Tortricidae genera
