= Sambirano =

Biogeographic region of northwestern Madagascar

The Sambirano region, also known as the Sambirano domain, is a biogeographic region of northwestern Madagascar. It has a distinctive lowland climate with year-round rain, differing from the rest of seasonally-dry western and northern Madagascar. The climate supports humid lowland rainforests, with greater similarity to those of eastern Madagascar than the dry deciduous forests characteristic of the Madagascar's western lowlands.

== Geography ==
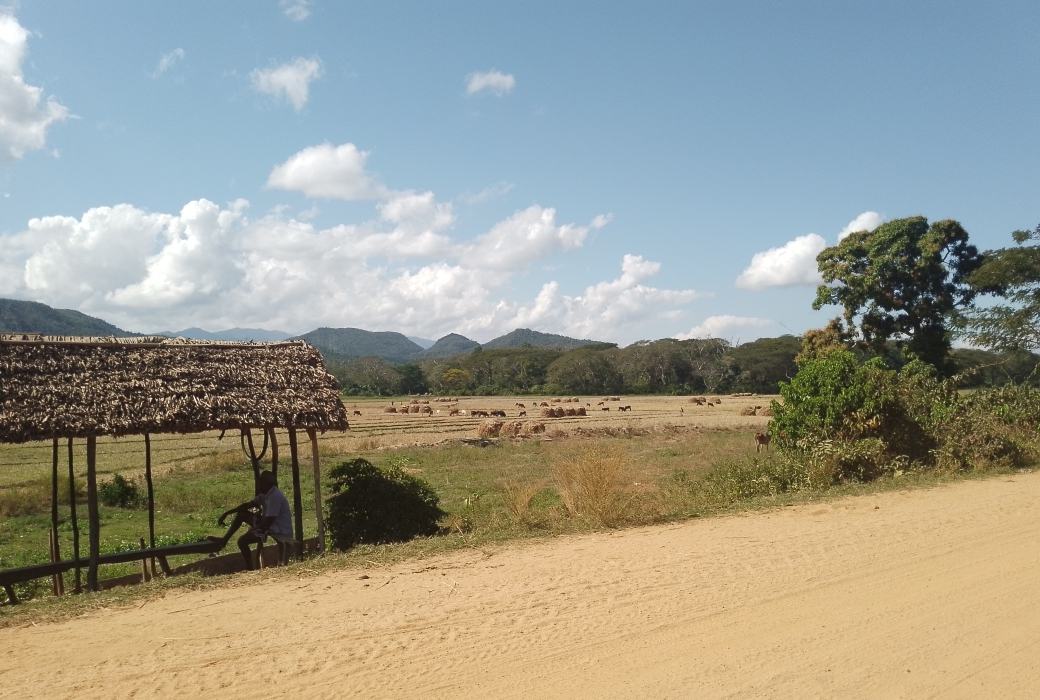
landscap of Sambirano domain

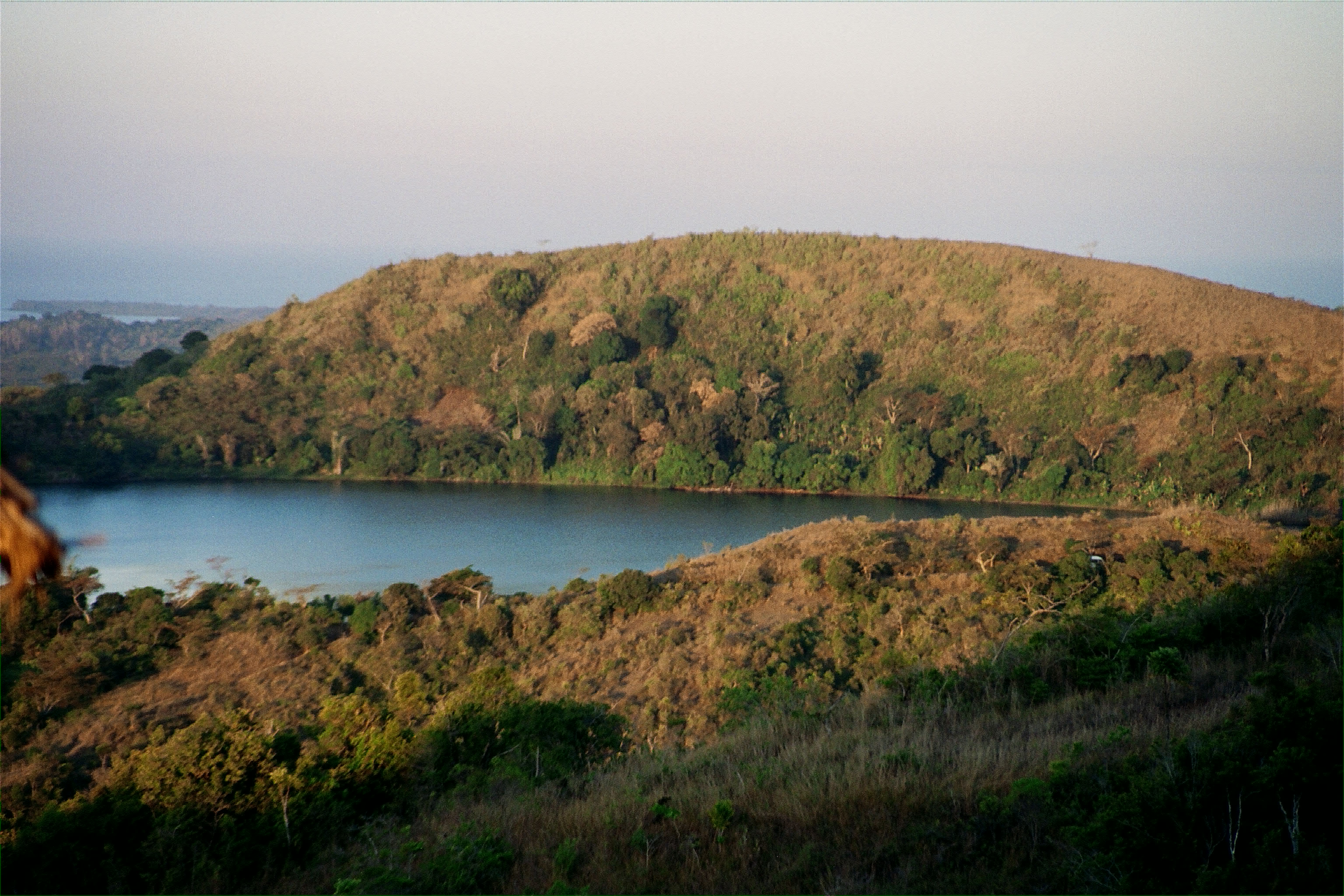
Landscape of Mont Passot on Nosy Be.

The region takes its name from the Sambirano River, which runs through the center of the region. The Sambirano region extends from the Ifasy River in the north to the Ampasindava Peninsula in the south, in the southwestern portion of Diana Region. It extends from the coast to the slopes of the Tsaratanana Massif, which bounds the region on the east. It also includes the islands of Nosy Be and Nosy Komba.

== Climate ==
The region receives summer monsoon rains characteristic of the west coast, but also rain during the winter months from the easterly trade winds. The trade winds bring winter rain to eastern Madagascar but across most of the west are intercepted by Madagascar's central highlands. The convergence of easterly wind currents in the lee of the Tsaratanana Massif is responsible for the Sambirano region's higher rainfall.

Average annual rainfall in Ambanja is 2171 mm. January is rainiest month, averaging 538.4 mm. May to October are drier months, with the lowest rainfall (24.6 mm) in July. Mean annual temperature averages 25.7 °C at Ambanja, with little seasonal variation and humidity throughout most of the year. As one ascends the slopes of Tsaratanana, rainfall and humidity increase, and temperature and seasonal rainfall variation decrease.

== Flora ==
The predominant natural vegetation in the region is lowland rainforest, although little remains. Mature forests have a canopy of trees 25 to 30 meters high, festooned with abundant lianas. There is a middle stratum of smaller, shade-tolerant trees, and a sparse understory of ferns, dwarf palms, shrubs, and herbaceous plants.

Trees of the families Sarcolaenaceae and Myristicaceae, and genus Anthostema are characteristic canopy trees, along with trees of families Fabaceae (Cynometra), Lauraceae (Ocotea and Cryptocarya agathophylla), Ebenaceae (Diospyros), Euphorbiaceae, Arecaceae, Rubiaceae, Sapindaceae, and Anacardiaceae.

Human disturbance, has reduced the rainforest to scattered patches. Grasslands are maintained through regular burning, and are used for livestock grazing. Secondary forest, known as savoka, grows in areas which were cleared for shifting cultivation and then left fallow. The palm-like native plant Ravenala madagascariensis is common in disturbed areas. Introduced species are increasingly common, including citrus, Psidium (guava), and the bamboo Cathariostachys capitata.

== Fauna ==
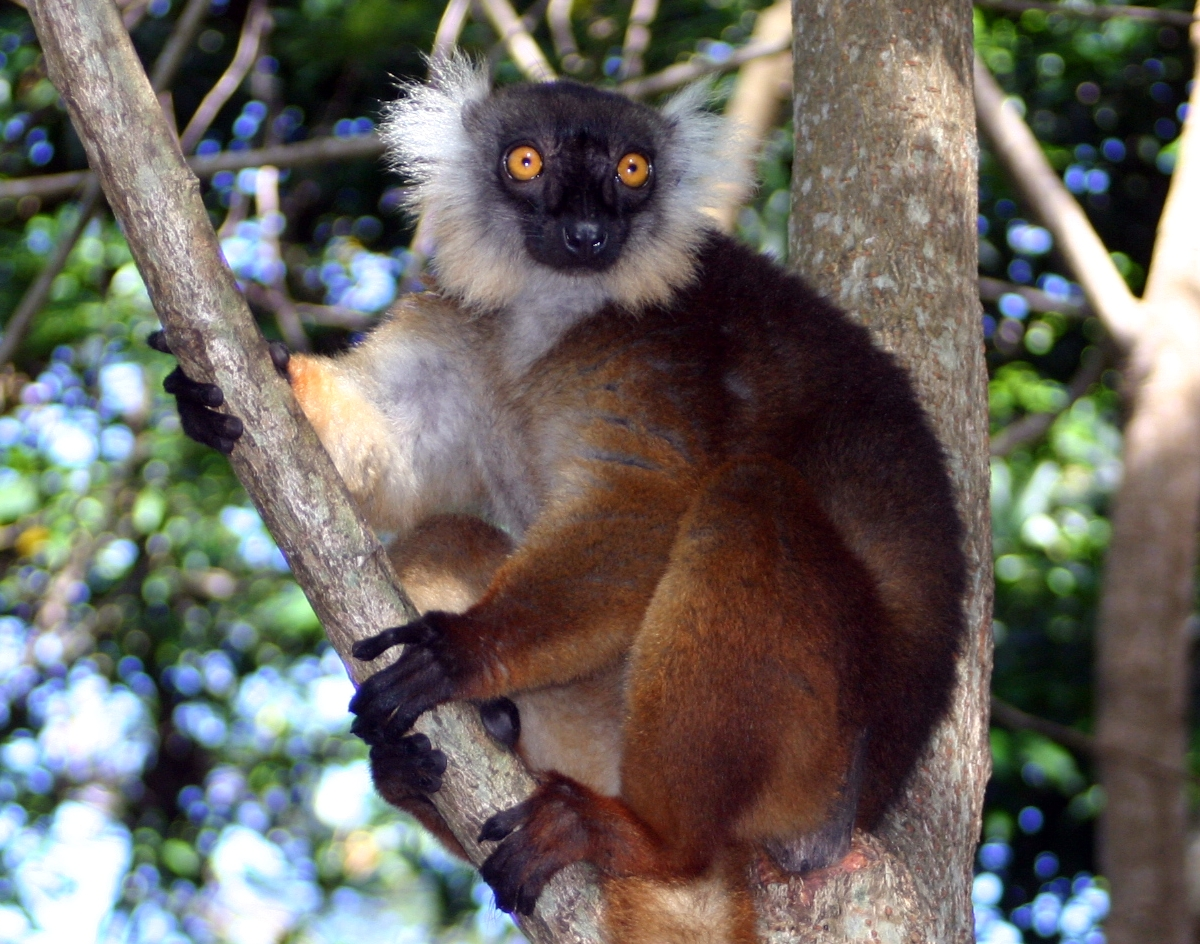
Female black lemur (Eulemur macaco)

Several species of lemur are endemic or mostly endemic to the Sambirano region, including the black lemur (Eulemur macaco), Pariente's fork-marked lemur (Phaner parienti), Nosy Be mouse lemur (Microcebus mamiratra), and Nosy Be sportive lemur (Lepilemur tymerlachsoni).

== Conservation ==
The largest remaining area of lowland rainforest is in Lokobe National Park on Nosy Be. Manongarivo Special Reserve preserves some enclaves of humid forest along with transitional lowland dry forest.
