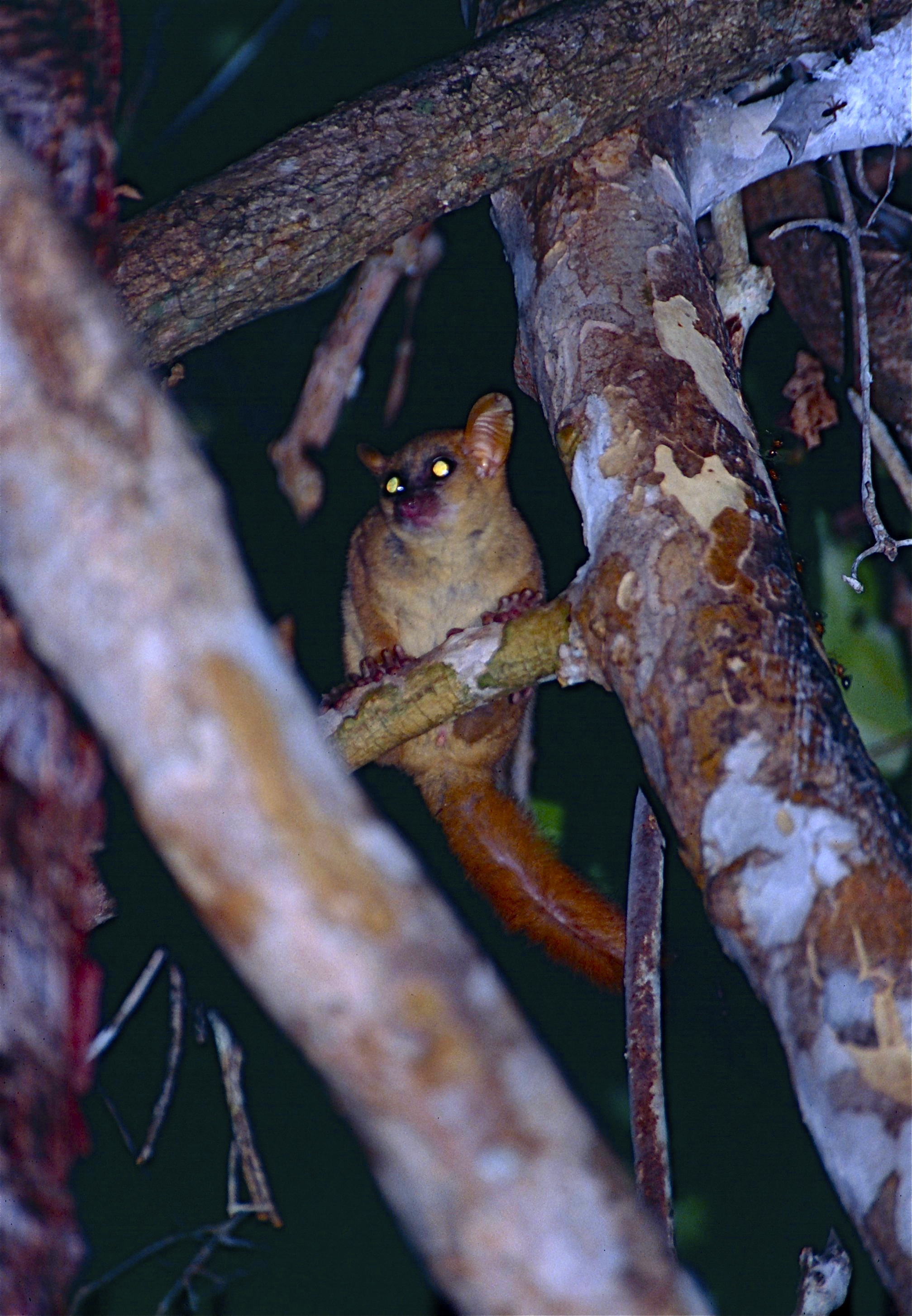

Conservation status
- Endangered (IUCN 3.1)
- CITES Appendix I

Scientific classification
- Kingdom: Animalia
- Phylum: Chordata
- Class: Mammalia
- Infraclass: Placentalia
- Order: Primates
- Suborder: Strepsirrhini
- Family: Cheirogaleidae
- Genus: Mirza
- Species: M. coquereli

Binomial name
- Mirza coquereli A. Grandidier, 1867
- Coquerel's giant mouse lemur range

= Coquerel's giant mouse lemur =

Species of lemur

Coquerel's giant mouse lemur (Mirza coquereli), also known as Coquerel's dwarf lemur or the southern giant mouse lemur, is a small nocturnal lemur endemic to Madagascar. This species can be found in parts of the Madagascar dry deciduous forests.

== Behaviour ==
This lemur is active throughout the year; unlike mouse lemurs (Microcebus), it does not hibernate. It feeds on the larvae of hemiptera (the true bugs) to sustain itself. It is an arboreal species, and feeds on fruit, flowers, and small animals such as insects and spiders. Coquerel's giant mouse lemur is heavily preyed upon by owls.

== Taxonomy ==
Coquerel's giant mouse lemur was named after the French entomologist Charles Coquerel. It was the only member of the genus Mirza until 2005, when a second species, the northern giant mouse lemur (M. zaza) was described.
