= Ian Tattersall =

American paleoanthropologist

Ian Tattersall PhD
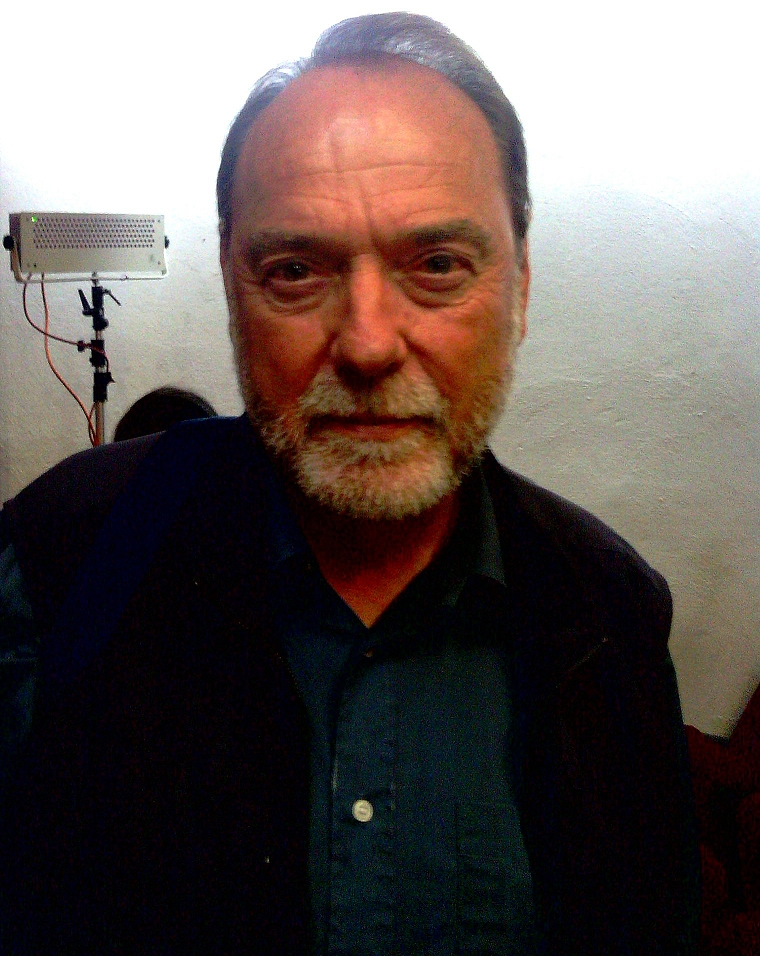
- Tattersall in September 2012, at the Calpe Conference in Gibraltar.
- Born: 1945 (age 80–81); England, United Kingdom
- Other name: I. Tattersall
- Education: University of Cambridge (BA; 1967); Yale University (PhD; 1971)
- Occupation: Paleoanthropologist
- Organization: American Museum of Natural History
- Website: http://www.amnh.org/

Ian Tattersall (born 1945) is a British-American paleoanthropologist and a curator emeritus with the American Museum of Natural History in New York City, New York. In addition to human evolution, Tattersall has worked extensively with lemurs. Tattersall is currently working with the Templeton Foundation.

== Early life and education ==
Tattersall was born in 1945 in the United Kingdom, and grew up in eastern Africa. He trained in archaeology and anthropology at the University of Cambridge, and earned his PhD from Yale University in 1971.

== Career ==
Tattersall has concentrated his research over the past quarter-century on the analysis of the human fossil record and the study of the ecology and systematics of the lemurs of Madagascar, and is considered a leader in both areas.

Tattersall believed that existing literature was not an adequate resource for comparing human fossils because of the many terminological variations. As a result, Tattersall and research associate Jeffrey Schwartz set out to document major fossils in the human fossil record. Their resulting three-volume work, Human Fossil Record, employs a consistent descriptive and photographic protocol, thus making it possible for individuals to make necessary fossil comparisons without the extensive travel that was once needed to consult original fossil findings.

Tattersall maintains that the notion of human evolution as a linear trudge from primitivism to perfection is incorrect. Whereas the Darwinian approach to evolution may be viewed as a fine-tuning of characteristics guided by natural selection, Tattersall takes a more generalist view. Tattersall claims that individual organisms are mind-bogglingly complex and integrated mechanisms; they succeed or fail as the sum of their parts, and not because of a particular characteristic. In terms of human evolution, Tattersall believes the process was more a matter of evolutionary experimentation in which a new species entered the environment, competed with other life forms, and either succeeded, failed, or became extinct within that environment: "To put it in perspective, consider the fact that the history of diversity and competition among human species began some five million years ago when there were at least four different human species living on the same landscape. Yet as a result of evolutionary experimentation, only one species has prospered and survived. One human species is now the only twig on what was once a big branching bush of different species." This idea differs from the typical view that homo sapiens is the pinnacle of an evolutionary ladder that humanity's ancestors laboriously climbed.

Tattersall is also continuing his independent inquiries into the nature and emergence of modern human cognition. He completed a book of essays on the subject, The Monkey in the Mirror: Essays on the Science of What Makes Us Human. Tattersall has over 200 scientific research publications, as well as more than a dozen trade books to his credit. As curator, he has also been responsible for several major exhibits at the American Museum of Natural History, including: Ancestors: Four Million Years of Humanity (1984), and Dark Caves, Bright Visions: Life In Ice Age Europe.

He serves on the executive board of the Institute of Human Origins and is a member of the Lemur Conservation Foundation's Scientific Advisory Council. (https://www.lemurreserve.org/about-lcf/experts/)

=== Awards and recognition ===
- W. W. Howells Prize of the American Anthropological Association, 2000 (for Becoming Human: Evolution and Human Uniqueness)
- Monuments Conservancy Perennial Wisdom Award, 1999
- Institute of Human Origins Lifetime Achievement Award, 1993

== Bibliography ==
- Understanding Human Evolution. Cambridge University Press. 2022
- The Strange Case of the Rickety Cossack: and Other Cautionary Tales from Human Evolution. Palgrave Macmillan. 2015. ISBN 9781137278890.
- I. Tattersall & R. DeSalle (2012). The Brain: Big Bangs, Behaviors, and Beliefs. Yale University Press. ISBN 978-0300175226.
- Masters of the Planet: The Search for Our Human Origins. Palgrave Macmillan. 2012. ISBN 978-0-230-10875-2.
- Ian Tattersall & Rob DeSalle (2011). Race?: Debunking a Scientific Myth. Texas: Texas A&M University Press. ISBN 978-1603444255.
- The Monkey in the Mirror: Essays on the Science of What Makes Us Human. Harvest Books. 2003. ISBN 0-15-602706-2.
- Paleoanthropology: The Last Half-Century Evolutionary Anthropology 9, no. 1 (2000): 2–16.
- I. Tattersall & J. Schwartz (2000). Extinct Humans. Boulder, Colorado: Westview Press. ISBN 9780813334820.
- The Human Chin Revisited: What Is It and Who Has It? Journal of Human Evolution 38 (2000): 367–409.
- Hominids and Hybrids: The Place of Neanderthals in Human Evolution. I. Tattersall & J. Schwartz, Proceedings of the National Academy of Sciences, U.S.A. 96 (1999): 7117–7119.
- Becoming Human: Evolution and Human Uniqueness. New York: Harcourt Brace. 1998.
- The Last Neanderthal: The Rise, Success, and Mysterious Extinction of Our Closest Human Relative. New York: Macmillan, 1995 (republished by Westview Press, 1999).
- The Fossil Trail: How We Know What We Think We Know About Human Evolution. New York: Oxford University Press. 1995.
- The Primates of Madagascar. New York: Columbia University Press. 1982.
