= List of primates described in the 2010s =

This is a list of species of the order Primates that were described in the 2010s.

== 2010 ==
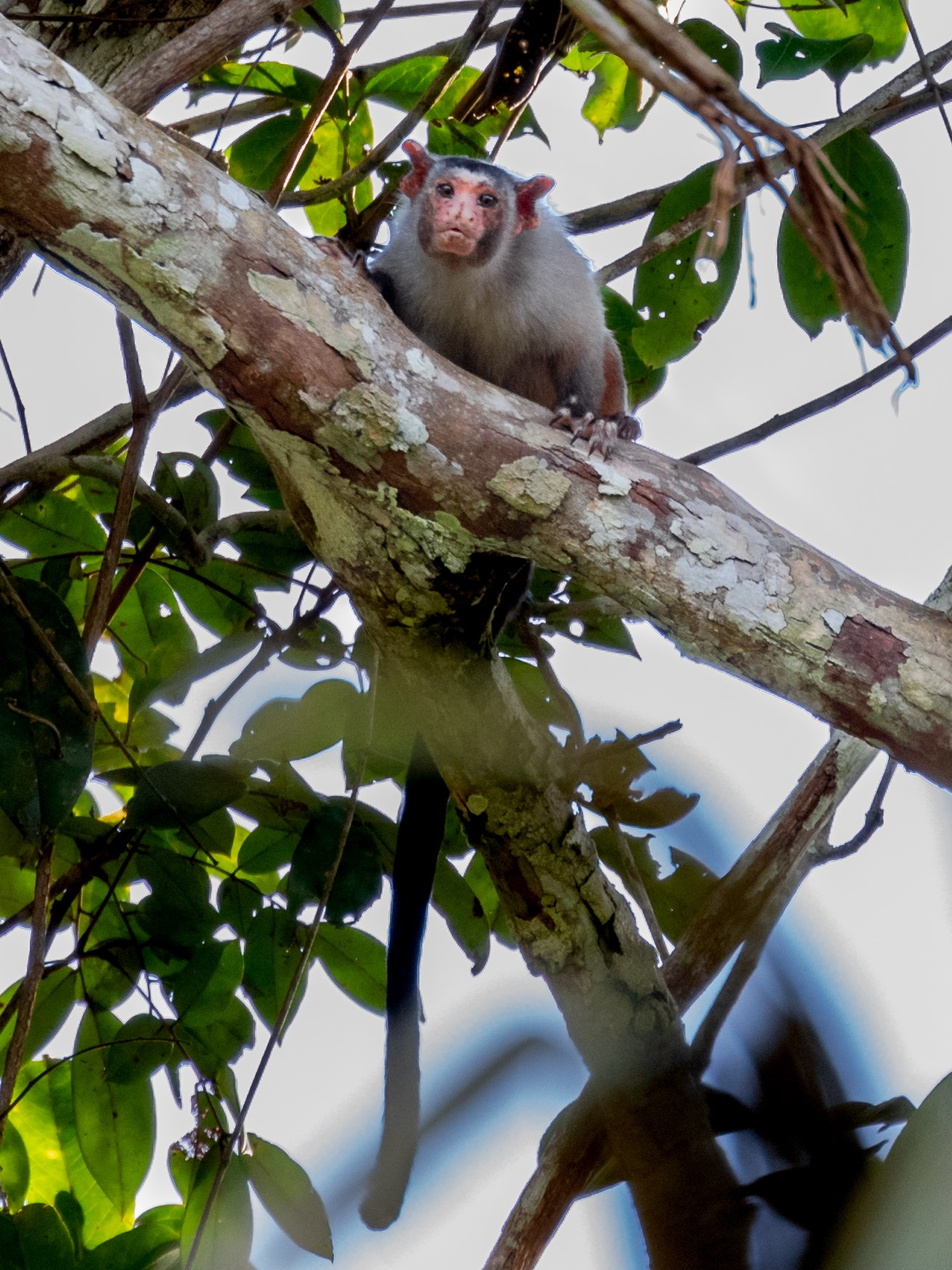
Rondon's marmoset

- Caquetá titi (Callicebus caquetensis) was described by Thomas Defler, Marta Bueno, and Javier Garcia. It is found in Colombia.
- Rondon's marmoset (Mico rondoni) was described by Ferrari, Sena, Schneider, and Silva Jr. It is found in Brazil.
- Northern buffed-cheeked gibbon (Nomascus annamensis) was described by Van Ngoc Thinh, Mootnick, Vu Ngoc Thanh, Nadler, and Roos. It is found in Cambodia, Laos, and Vietnam.
- Myanmar snub-nosed monkey (Rhinopithecus strykeri) was described by Thomas Geissmann, Ngwe Lwin, Saw Soe Aung, Thet Naing Aung, Zin Myo Aung, Tony Htin Hla, Mark Grindley, and Frank Momberg. It is found in Myanmar.
- Wallace's tarsier (Tarsius wallacei) was described by Merker, Driller, Dahruddin, Wirdateti, Sinaga, Perwitasari-Farajallah, and Shekelle. It is found in Indonesia on the island of Sulawesi.

== 2011 ==
- Gerp's mouse lemur (Microcebus gerpi) was described by Radespiel and collaborators. It is found in eastern Madagascar.

== 2012 ==
- Lesula (Cercopithecus lomamiensis) was described by Hart, Detwiler, Gilbert, Burrell, Fuller, Emetshu, Hart, Vosper, Sargis, and Tosi. It is found in the Democratic Republic of Congo.
- Vieira's titi (Callicebus vieirai) was described by Gualda-Barros, Nascimento and Amaral. It is found in the central-northern Brazil.

== 2013 ==
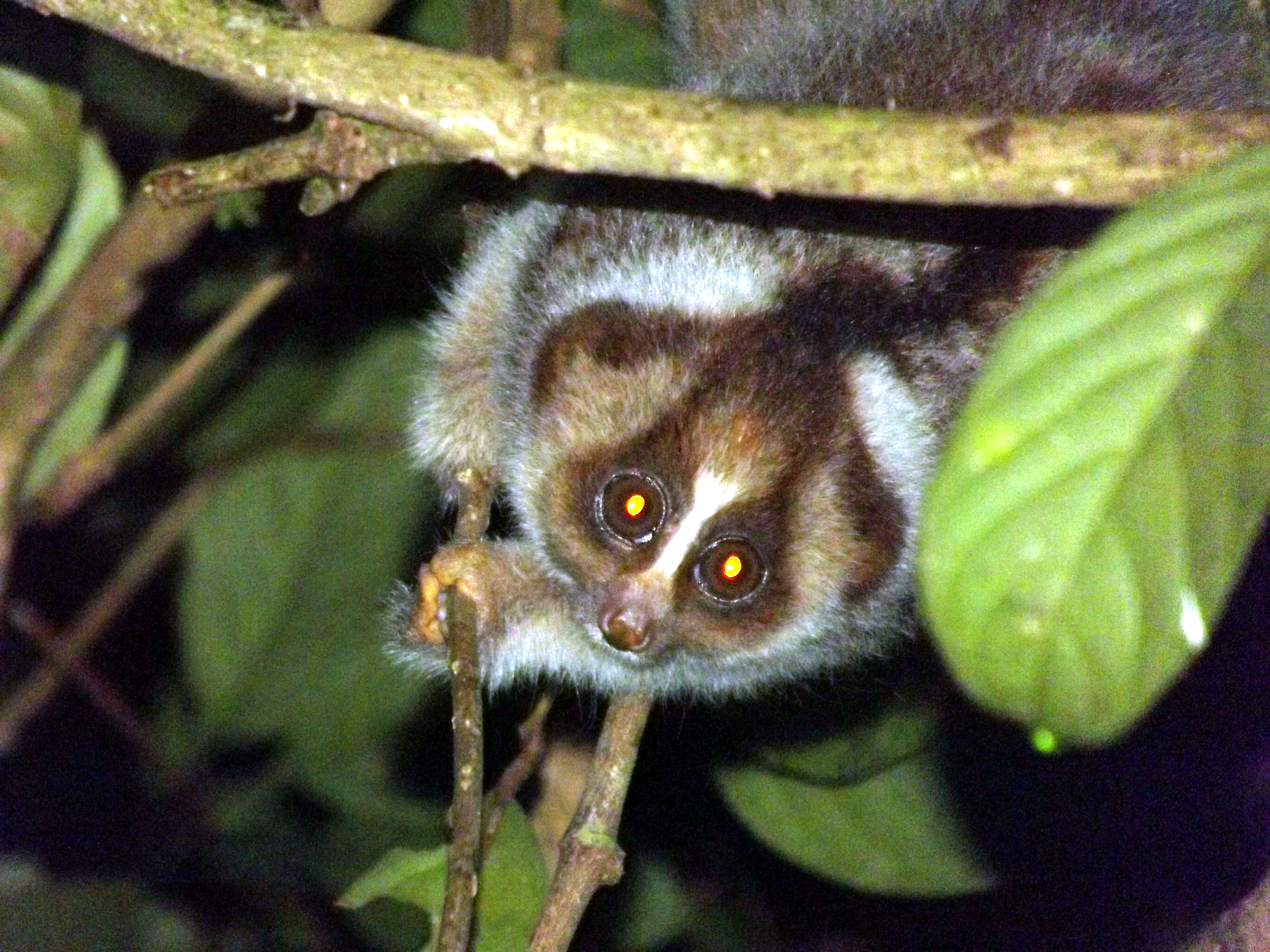
Kayan River slow loris

- Kayan River slow loris (Nycticebus kayan), a species of slow loris, was first described by Rachel Munds, Anna Nekaris, and Susan Ford.
- Makandé squirrel galago (Sciurocheirus makandensis), a species of galago, was described by Ambrose. It is found in Gabon.
- Marohita mouse lemur (Microcebus marohita), a mouse lemur, was described by Rodin Rasoloarison, David Weisrock, Anne Yoder, Daniel Rakotondravony, and Peter Kappeler. It is found in eastern Madagascar.
- Anosy mouse lemur (Microcebus tanosi), a mouse lemur, was described by Rodin Rasoloarison, David Weisrock, Anne Yoder, Daniel Rakotondravony, and Peter Kappeler. It is found in eastern Madagascar.
- Lavasoa dwarf lemur (Cheirogaleus lavasoensis), a dwarf lemur, described by Thiele, Razafimahatratra, and Hapke. It is found in the Lavasoa Mountains in southern Madagascar.

== 2014 ==
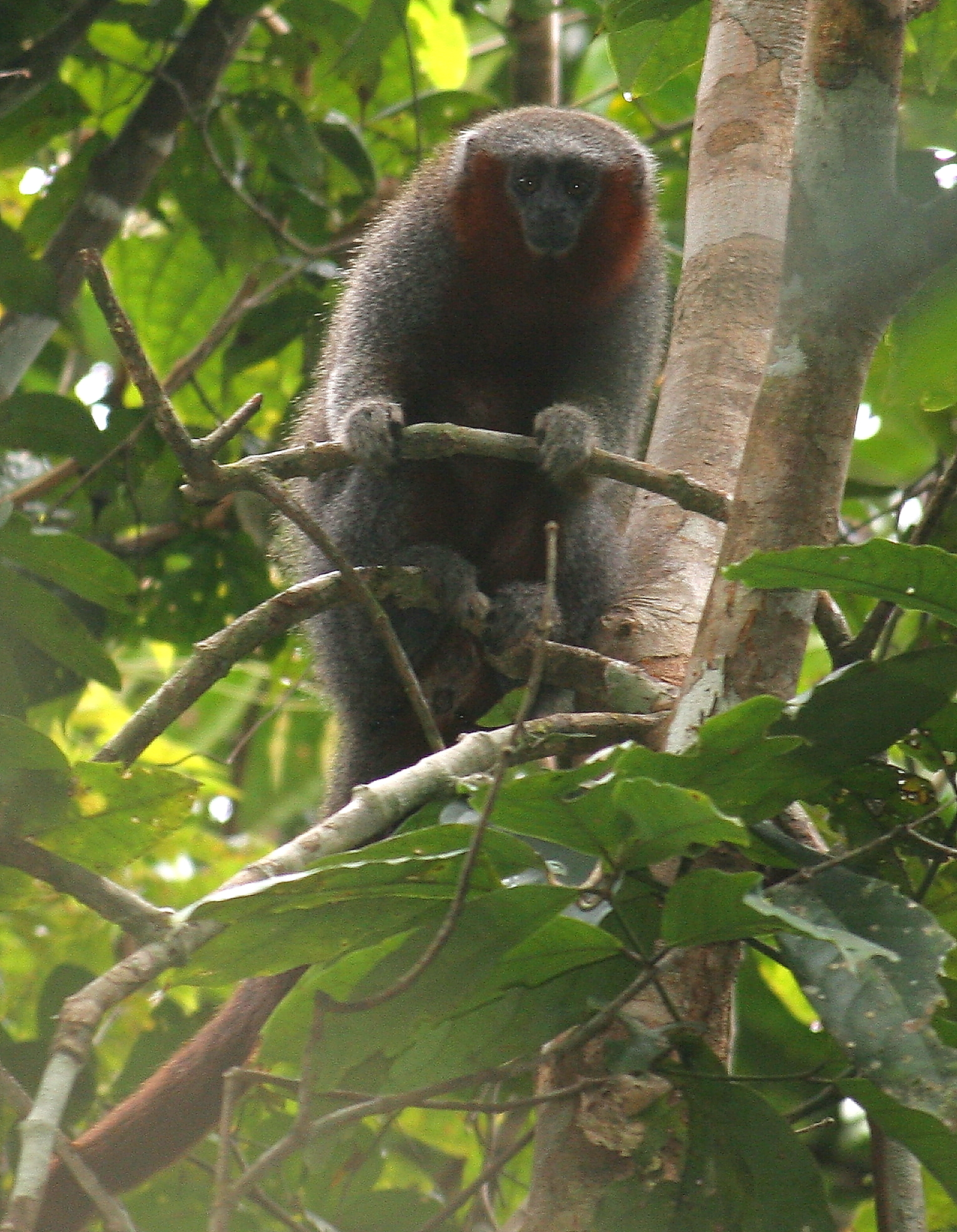
Milton's titi

- Milton's titi (Callicebus miltoni), described by Julio César Dalponte, Felipe Ennes Silva e José de Sousa e Silva Júnior. Endemic to Brazil.
- Isabel's saki (Pithecia isabela), a saki from Peru described by Laura Marsh. It is named after an aristocratic Peruvian woman named Isabel Godin des Odonais.
- Cazuza's saki (Pithecia cazuzai), a saki from Brazil described by Laura Marsh. It was named after Brazilian primatologist Dr. José de Sousa e Silva Júnior, nicknamed "Cazuza".
- Mittermeier's Tapajós saki (Pithecia mittermeieri), a saki from Brazil described by Laura Marsh and named for primatologist Russell Mittermeier. Although supported by the IUCN/SSC Primate Specialist Group and ITIS, the species designation is disputed by Serrano-Villavicencio et al. 2019.
- Rylands' bald-faced saki (Pithecia rylandsi), a saki found in Bolivia, Peru, and possibly Brazil described by Laura Marsh and named after Anthony Rylands. Although supported by the IUCN/SSC Primate Specialist Group and ITIS, the species designation is disputed by Serrano-Villavicencio et al. 2019.
- Pissinatti's bald-faced saki (Pithecia pissinatti), a saki described by Laura Marsh. Although supported by the IUCN/SSC Primate Specialist Group and ITIS, the species designation is disputed by Serrano-Villavicencio et al. 2019.

== 2015 ==
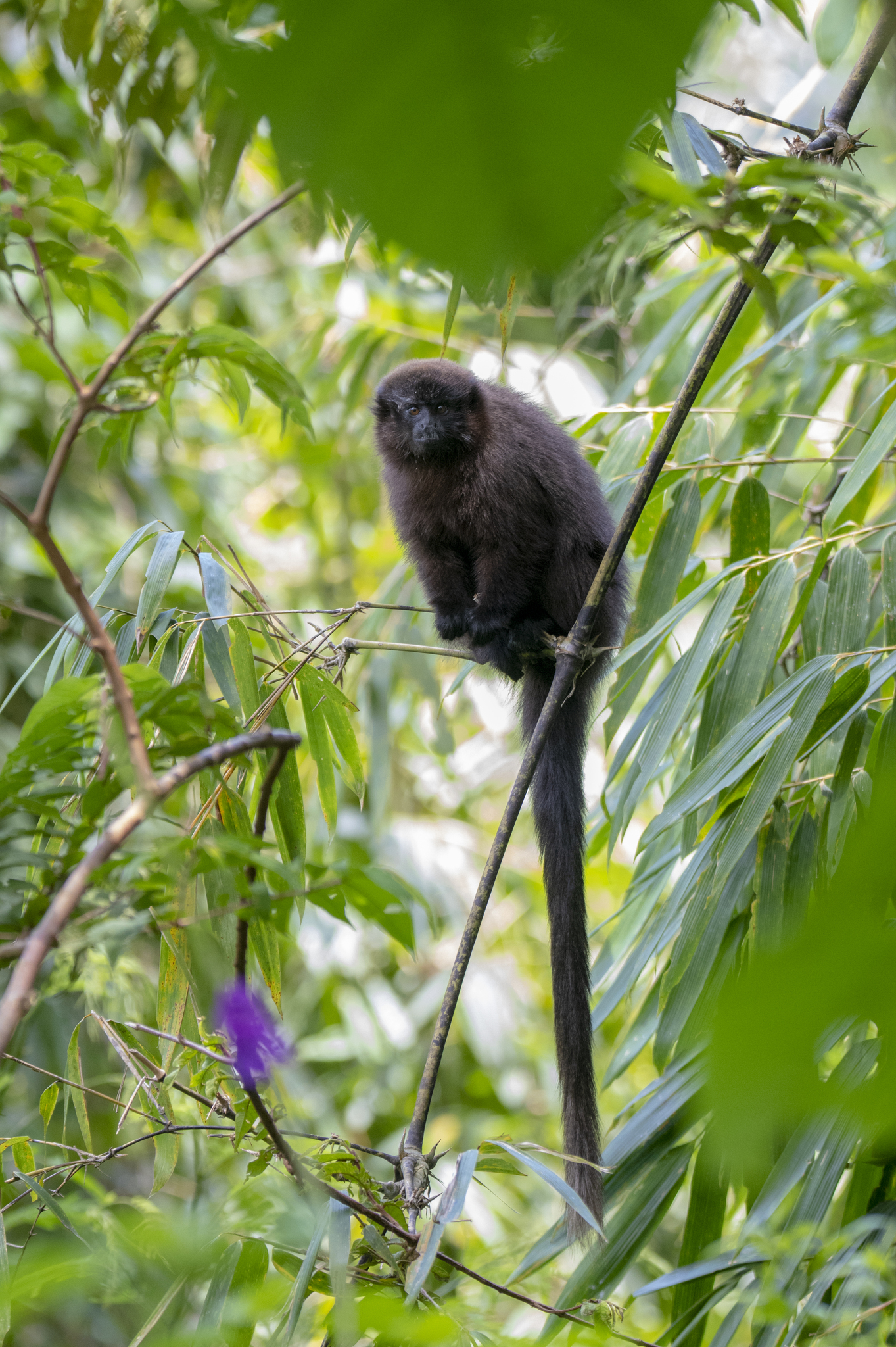
Urubamba brown titi

- White-cheeked macaque (Macaca leucogenys), was thought to be an Assam macaque (Macaca assamensis), but distinct differences led to Macaca leucogenys being considered a new species.
- Urubamba brown titi (Plecturocebus urubambensis), a titi from Peru described by Vermeer and Tello-Alvarado as Callicebus urubambensis.
- Montagne d'Ambre dwarf lemur (Cheirogaleus andysabini), a dwarf lemur from Madagascar described by Lei, McLain, Frasier, Taylor, Bailey, Engberg, Ginter, Nash, Randriamampionona, Groves, Mittermeier and Louis, Jr.

== 2016 ==
- Bemanasy mouse lemur (Microcebus manitrata), a mouse lemur from Madagascar described by Hotaling, Foley, Lawrence, Bocanegra, Blanco, Rasoloarison, Kappeler, Barrett, Yoder and Weisrock.
- Ganzhorn's mouse lemur (Microcebus ganzhorni), a mouse lemur from Madagascar described by Hotaling, Foley, Lawrence, Bocanegra, Blanco, Rasoloarison, Kappeler, Barrett, Yoder and Weisrock.
- Nosy Boraha mouse lemur (Microcebus boraha), a mouse lemur from Madagascar described by Hotaling, Foley, Lawrence, Bocanegra, Blanco, Rasoloarison, Kappeler, Barrett, Yoder and Weisrock.
- Ankarana dwarf lemur (Cheirogaleus shethi), a dwarf lemur from northern Madagascar described by Frasier, Lei, McLain, Taylor, Bailey, Ginter, Nash, Randriamampionona, Groves, Mittermeier and Louis Jr.

== 2017 ==
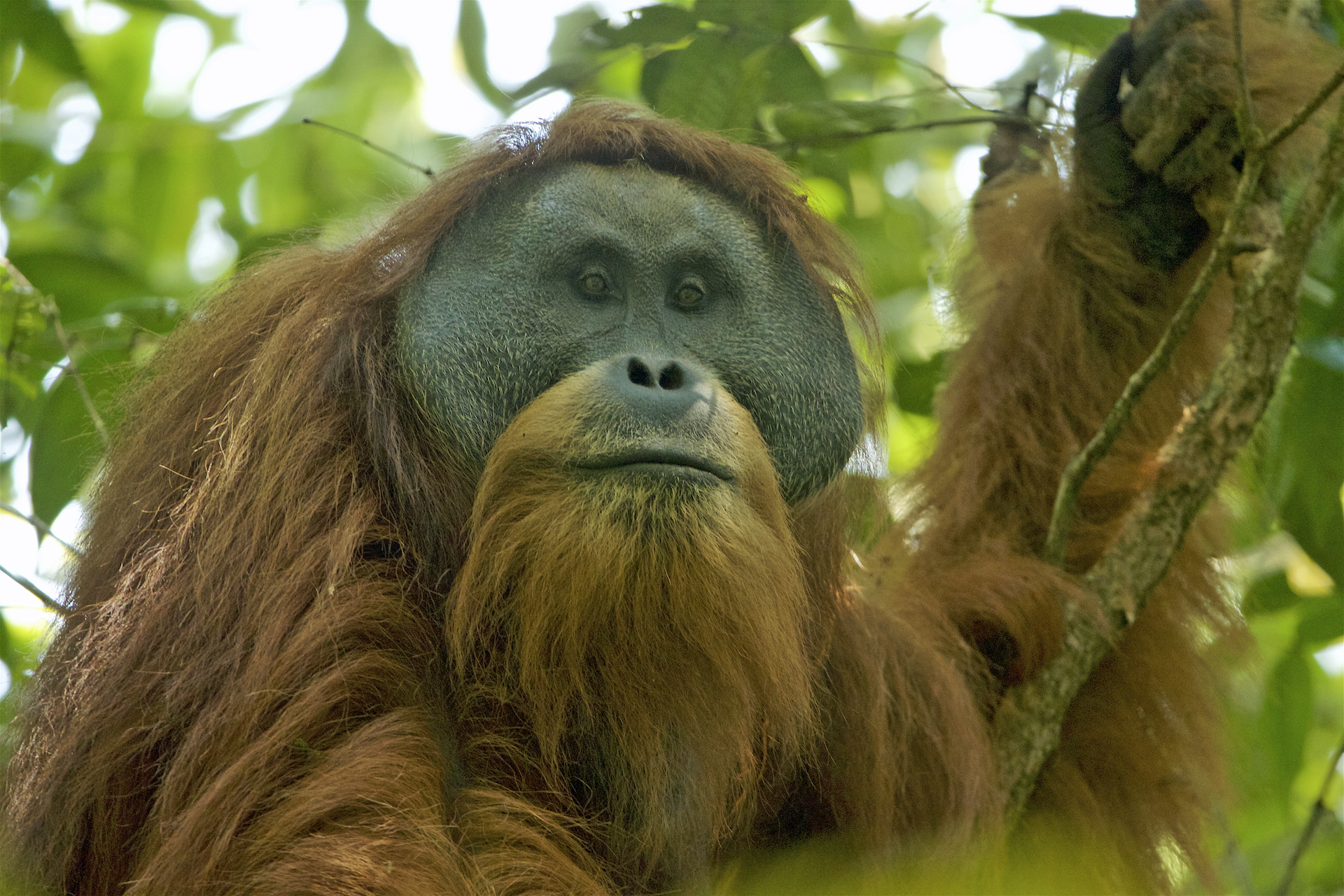
The Tapanuli orangutan, which became recognized as a distinct species in 2017

- Tapanuli orangutan (Pongo tapanuliensis), was reported in 1939, then rediscovered in 1997, but wasn't described as a distinct species until 2017.
- Skywalker hoolock gibbon (Hoolock tianxing), described in 2017 and named after Star Wars character Luke Skywalker.
- Gursky's spectral tarsier (Tarsius spectrumgurskyae), a tarsier from Sulawesi, Indonesia described by Shekelle, Groves, Maryanto, and Mittermeier.
- Jatna's tarsier (Tarsius supriatnai), a tarsier from Indonesia described by Shekelle, Groves, Maryanto, and Mittermeier.
- Angolan dwarf galago (Galagoides kumbirensis), is a dwarf galago from Angola described by Svensson, Bersacola, Mills, Munds, Nijman, Perkin, Masters, Couette, Nekaris and Bearder.
- Groves' dwarf lemur (Cheirogaleus grovesi) is a dwarf lemur from Madagascar described by McLain, Lei, Frasier, Taylor, Bailey, Roberts, Nash, Randriamanana, Mittermeier and Louis Jr.

== 2018 ==
- Alta Floresta titi (Plecturocebus grovesi) a titi from Brazil described by Byrne, Silva, Silva-Júnior, Costa Araujo, Bertuol, Gonçalves, Melo, Rylands, Mittermeier, Silva, Nash, Canale, Alencar, Rossi, Carneiro, Sampaio, I. P. Farias, Schneider, and Hrbek.

== 2019 ==
- Niemitz's tarsier (Tarsius niemitzi), a tarsier from the Togean Islands of Indonesia described by Shekelle, Groves, Maryanto, Mittermeier, Salim, A. and Springer.
- Munduruku marmoset (Mico munduruku), a marmoset from Pará in Brazil described by Costa-Araújo, Hrbek & Farias in Costa-Araújo, Melo, Canale, Hernández-Rangel, Messias, Rossi, F. E. Silva, M. N. F. da Silva, Nash, Boubli, I. P. Farias & Hrbek.
- Parecis titi (Plecturocebus parecis), a species of titi from northern Brazil described by Gusmão, Messias, Carneiro, Schneider, Alencar, Calouro, Dalponte, Mattos, Ferrari, Buss, Azevedo, Santos Jr, Nash, Rylands, and Barnett.

== See also ==
- List of primates described in the 2000s
- List of primates described in the 2020s
- List of mammals described in the 21st century
