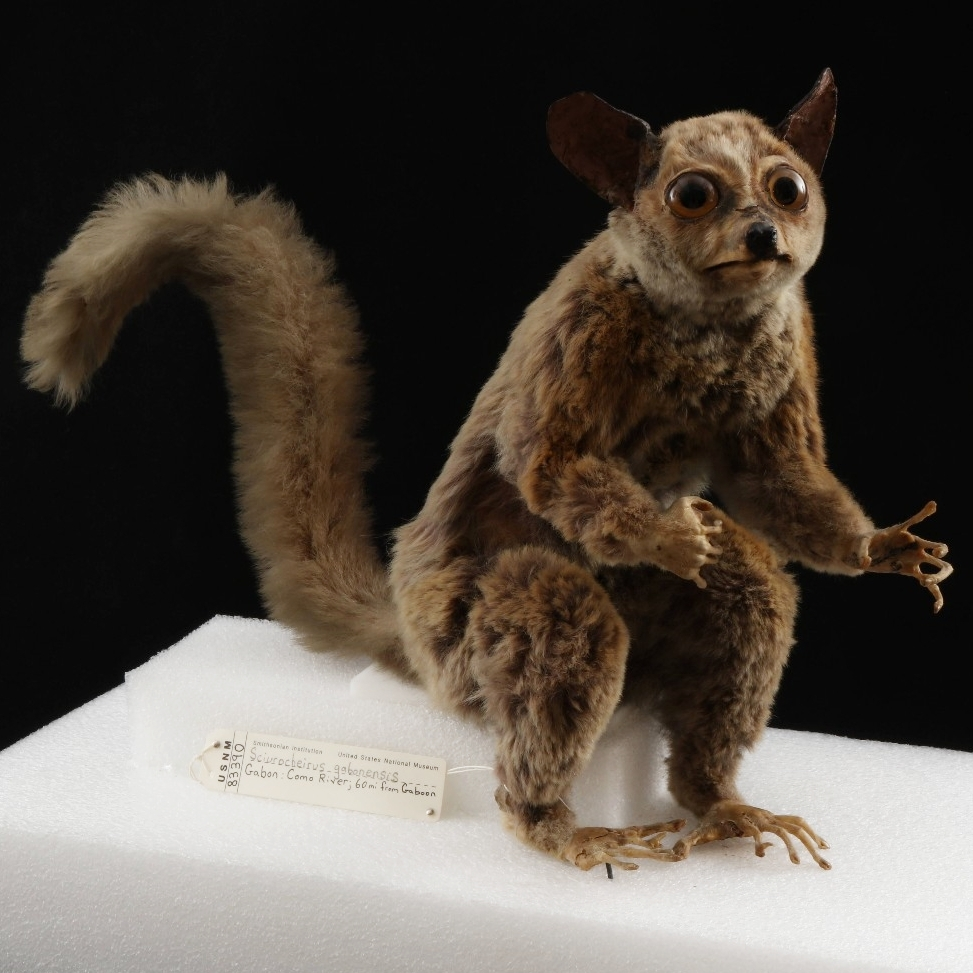

Conservation status
- Least Concern (IUCN 3.1)

Scientific classification
- Kingdom: Animalia
- Phylum: Chordata
- Class: Mammalia
- Order: Primates
- Suborder: Strepsirrhini
- Family: Galagidae
- Genus: Sciurocheirus
- Species: S. gabonensis

Binomial name
- Sciurocheirus gabonensis (J. E. Gray, 1863)
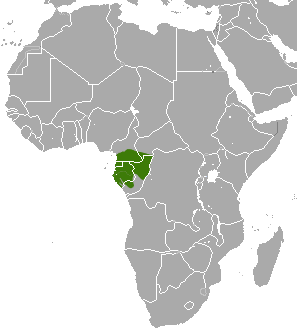
- Gabon bushbaby range

= Gabon bushbaby =

Species of primate

The Gabon bushbaby (Sciurocheirus gabonensis) is a species of primate in the family Galagidae found in Cameroon, Gabon, and the Republic of the Congo. Its head and body length is 8.5 in with a 10-in tail, and it weighs about 10 oz. It lives in evergreen tropical rainforests and eats primarily fallen fruit, but also some arthropods.

== Description ==
The Gabon bushbaby is highly specialized for a saltatory mode of locomotion. The head-body length ranges from 155 to 240 millimeters (6.1 to 9.4 in), with body weight varying between 200 and 445 grams (7.1 and 15.7 oz). Males are about 11% larger than females. The cranium lacks an interparietal bone, and the mastoid region is enlarged. The skull exhibits profound post-orbital constriction, and the eyes are flanked by postorbital bars. The muzzle is pointed and has numerous mystacial whiskers. The dental formula is 2.1.3.32.1.3.3 × 2 = 36. The upper incisors (I^{1–2}) differ in size from each other. The upper third molar (M^{3}) lacks a hypocone cusp, while the lower third molar (M_{3}) lacks a hypoconulid cusp. The digital formula is 4>3>5>2>1, with manual digit 2 being about as long as the terminal interphalangeal joint of manual digit 3. Pedal digits 4 and 3 are elongated relative to the manual digits. Large tactile pads rest atop the distal phalanges, and pedal digit 2 has the typical grooming claw of a strepsirrhine. The vertebral formula consists of 7 cervicals, 13 thoracics, 6 lumbars, 3 sacrals, and 23 caudals. The intermembral index is 64; the hindlimb is more than 1 1/2 the length of the forelimb. The foot is half the length of the spinal column, and is more than 1 1/2 the length of the hand, with the tarsus alone being 1/5 the length of the spine. The navicular and calcaneus are especially elongated. The tail is well-developed, and plays an important role in balancing the animal during locomotion.

The brain weighs about 6.1 g (0.22 oz), and has a flattish, ovoid shape. The ears are spoon-shaped, have prominent cross ridges, are capable of moving independently of each other, and are among the largest ears relative to body size among primates. Being a nocturnal animal, the eyes are large and forward-facing. This orbital frontality grants the Gabon bushbaby stereopsis through binocular vision. Between the nose and lip is a moist rhinarium. Three pairs of mammae are present. The cecum is not sacculated. The stomach is capable of holding up to 20 g (0.71 oz) of food at a time.

The pelage of the Gabon bushbaby is generally browner than the darker Bioko Allen's bushbaby (Sciurocheirus alleni alleni) and the lighter Cross River bushbaby (S. a. cameronensis). The ears are dark gray at the tips. The back is generally gray while the ventral surface of the torso and the flexor surfaces of the limbs are pale gray washed with a yellow tinge. The limbs are rufous, especially the hindlimbs. The tail is fluffy and dark gray on both the ventral and dorsal surfaces, darkening from a paler slate color at the base into a black shade in the distal section. Some individuals have a white tip of the tail. The iris is dark brown and fades into a chestnut color with age. The retinal reflection of the tapetum lucidum is bottle-green. Dark circumocular rings surround the eyes and run down either side of the nose.

== Ecology ==
The Gabon bushbaby's range extends from the Sanaga River in Cameroon, through the Republic of the Congo and Equatorial Guinea to Gabon, where it is found north of the Ogooué River. The Gabon bushbaby can be found in primary forests such as swamps and lowland rainforests. Populations are also known to exist in secondary forests and felled areas. It prefers the undergrowth layer 1 to 2 meters (3 ft 3 in to 6 ft 7 in) above the ground, especially in areas with ample vertical supports. Such supports include vertical substrates such as lianas between 1 and 15 cm (0.39 and 5.91 in) in diameter. The average population density is 15 bushbabies/km^{2}. Populations become less dense in lower elevations. Female home ranges vary between 8 to 10 hectares (20 to 25 acres) in size, whereas males' are significantly larger at 30 to 60 ha (74 to 148 acres). Female Gabon bushbabies thoroughly traverse their home ranges, always visiting any given location in their territory within a week's interval. Male-male competition plays an important role in the distribution of male home ranges, as the large sizes of home ranges coupled with the even birth ratio of the species indicates intense intrasexual competition for territory and mating opportunities; there is about one adult male for ever 5–6 adult females. This uneven sex ratio may be a result of the males having to travel greater distances in their larger home ranges, putting them at greater risk of predation. Animals that are known to prey on the Gabon bushbaby include snakes, the African palm civet (Nandinia binotata), the Central African linsang (Poiana richardsonii), and owls. Female home ranges will sometimes overlap, while males' never.

== Behavior ==
The Gabon bushbaby is a nocturnal, terretorial, arboreal omnivore that is typically found in the underbrush stratum of tropical rainforests, and has a solitary but social association with conspecifics. Females give birth to a single offspring every year, with low rates of twinning. During the day, adult males typically sleep alone, whereas adult females and their offspring form gregarious sleeping groups of two or three adult-offspring pairs. Sleeping sites are almost always in tree hollows, and are sometimes shared with bats or rodents. The Gabon bushbaby awakens half an hour before nightfall, usually once the ambient illuminance has lowered to 50–20 lux, whereupon it engages in a long bout of autogrooming. Although they are dispersed throughout the night, adults maintain contact with one another through vocalizations. Males are generally more transient than females. As an inhabitant of the underbrush stratum, the Gabon bushbaby lives in proximity to terrestrial predators such as leopards (Panthera pardus). It exhibits mobbing behaviors towards such animals wherein groups of Gabon bushbabies pursue large predators, harassing them with alarm vocalizations.

=== Diet ===
Animal prey by average mass in stomach (n = 12)
Food item	Quantity
Beetles	25%
Snails	15%
Moths	15%
Frogs	8%
Ants	8%
Spiders	8%
Orthopterans	< 1%
Termites	< 1%
Centipedes	< 1%
Pupae	< 1%
Caterpillars	"a few"

The Gabon bushbaby is primarily frugivorous and secondarily carnivorous, although fruit is a supplement to the smaller portion of its diet that includes animal prey; it prefers insects over fruit when available. Prey is primarily hunted using audition, and hunting most often occurs on or near the forest floor. Invertebrates comprise the majority of the prey items consumed by wild Gabon bushbabies, though captive individuals have been observed to consume lizards and rodents. The Gabon bushbaby forages for fallen fruit on the forest floor. Its reliance on fallen fruit and its preference for hunting prey at the ground level are the result of resource partitioning with sympatric strepsirrhines such as the carnivorous golden angwantibo (Arctocebus aureus), which specializes in consuming noxious insects that are not sought after by the Gabon bushbaby, and the frugivorous West African potto (Perodicticus potto), which forages for fruit in a different vertical layer of the rainforest.

Because its habitat is closer to the ground that that of some other galagos, the Gabon bushbaby can rapidly swallow food items collected from the forest floor, such that fruit up to the size of a cherry can be consumed without chewing. By rapidly filling up its large stomach while on the ground, less time is spent within reach of terrestrial carnivores.

=== Communication ===
Because of its nocturnality, the Gabon bushbaby must rely on vocal communication with conspecifics in lieu of visual signals. Vocalizations are used to sustain contact with conspecifics, seek out mating opportunities, harass rivals, and warn conspecifics of predators. As a squirrel galago, it exhibits calls that are unique to the genus such as certain whistles and long-distance croaks in short sequences. Among such vocalizations includes a "click" or "tsic" that is produced by immature individuals when alarmed; the former form precedes the latter as distress increases. A croaking sound is used as the social contact call. This has lower frequencies that those that are produced by sympatric galagos such as Prince Demidoff's bushbaby (Galagoides demidovii) due to the Gabon bushbaby inhabiting a lower stratum of the rainforest with denser vegetation. This vocalization can establish contact between bushbabies over 250 m (820 ft) apart. Rival individuals reciprocate this call across each other's home ranges. The alarm vocalization is a "kiou-kiou-kiou-…," which is a long ranged call that occurs in a sequence of 2–20 "kiou"s; the greater the caller's agitation, the more "kiou"s are produced. The 4,500–5,500 Hz component of the "kiou" call decays after passing through approximately 60 m (200 ft) of vegetation, leaving the 1,000–1,500 Hz component to travel further. This degradation could be an indication of the distance that the caller is from the listener. Additionally, there are variations in this call between individuals, which allows for the identity of the caller to be discerned. The alarm vocalization is more unique to the species in composition compared to other, more generalized vocalizations that are shared with related bushbabies. The threat vocalization is a "quee quee quee," consisting of parabolic units that are produced in sequences of 3–10 vocalizations. This is often accompanied by an aggressive posture with growls preceding the sequence. The distress call is a high-pitched "wheet" that is uttered as a pain response. This vocalization attracts conspecifics.

Urine marking is another method of communication used by the Gabon bushbaby. Urine marks indicate the identity of the depositor, their sex, and, in the case of females, the status of their ovarian cycle. Urine can be deposited directly onto substrates or through washing of the hands and feet. In the latter case, an individual's urine is then applied to conspecifics during allogrooming, and is more commonly practiced by males than females. Washing the hands with urine may also serve to enhance a Gabon bushbaby's grip on substrates during locomotion.

== Status ==
The Gabon bushbaby has a relatively wide range and is a fairly common species. Apart from some felling of forest for timber and for conversion into agricultural land, no particular threats have been identified. It is sometimes hunted by humans. This bushbaby is present in a number of protected areas, so the International Union for Conservation of Nature has rated its conservation status as being of "least concern".
