= List of primates described in the 2020s =

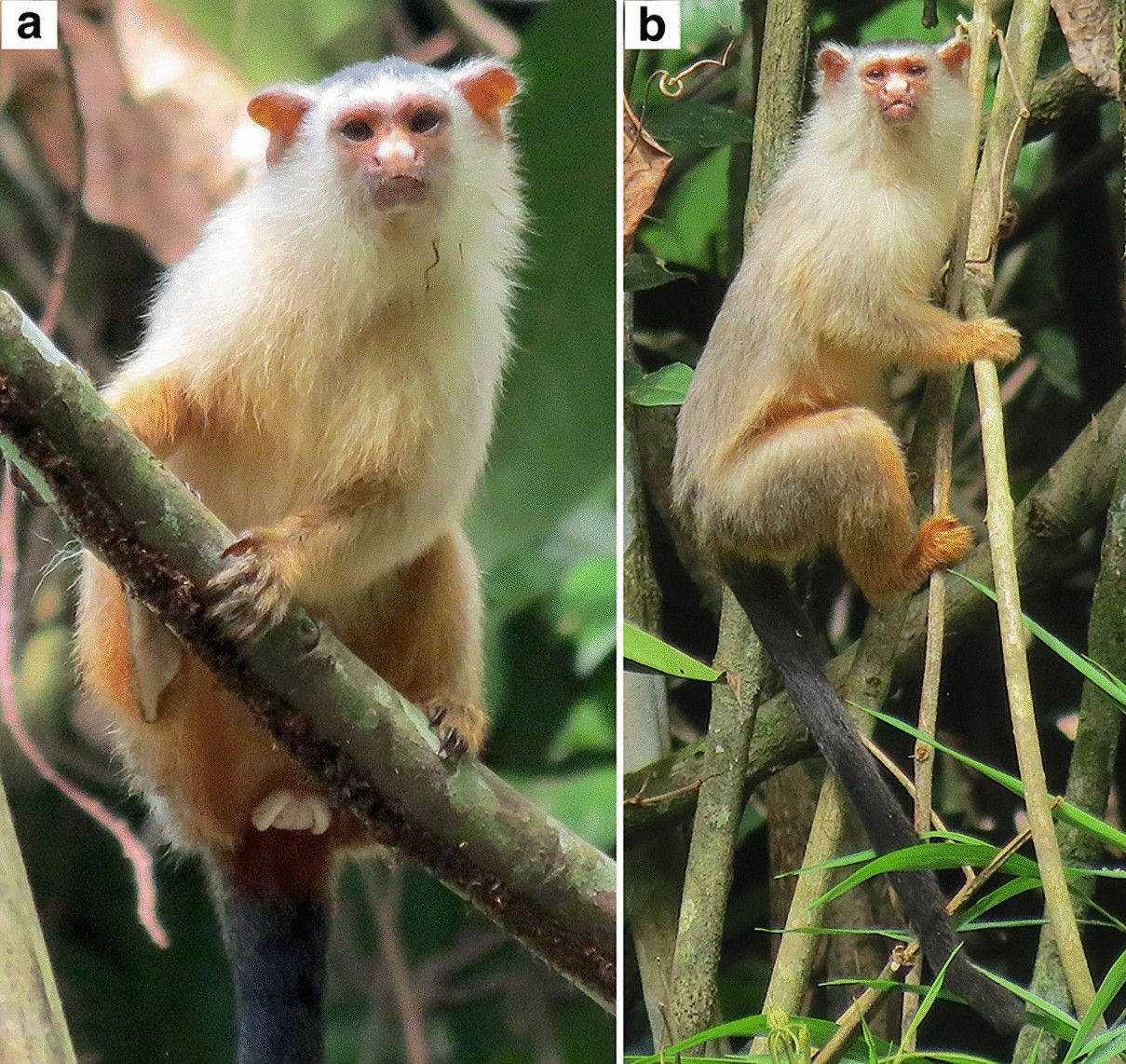
Schneider's marmoset, first described in 2021

This is a list of primates described in the 2020s. As primates are a well-studied group, species that are unknown to science are rare. However, recent advances in DNA sequencing have allowed scientists to compare populations and test for distinct lineages in extant species. This list includes species that have been discovered, formally described, or brought to public light in the year 2020 or later. New primate species are recorded by the International Union for Conservation of Nature Species Survival Commission (IUCN/SSC) Primate Specialist Group, an organisation chaired by primatologist Russell Mittermeier and deputy chaired by Anthony Rylands. In the previous ten years 36 primates were described.

== 2020 ==
=== Jonah's mouse lemur (Microcebus jonahi) ===
A species of mouse lemur from northeastern Madagascar described by Schüßler et al. 2020. DNA sequencing confirmed its species status and it was named after Malagasy primatologist Jonah Ratsimbazafy. Morphological differences to its closest relative, MacArthur's mouse lemur (M. macarthurii), include its greater length, shorter tail, wider ears, larger head width and shorter head length. Jonah's mouse lemur is also whiter on its underside, while MacArthur's mouse lemur is more yellowish orange.

=== Popa langur (Trachypithecus popa) ===
A species of langur from Myanmar described by Roos et al. 2020. The Popa langur was named for Mount Popa where a population of 111 individuals live. Although yet to be assessed by the International Union for Conservation of Nature (IUCN), it is thought to be critically endangered with a total population of 199–259 individuals.

== 2021 ==
=== Schneider's marmoset (Mico schneideri) ===
A species of marmoset from northern Brazil described by Costa-Araújo et al. 2021. It is named after Professor Horatio Schneider, a Brazilian geneticist and primatologist. It is morphologically distinct from other species of marmoset by its fur coloration; its tail and crown are black, its head is white, its mantle, forearms, and underparts are greyish cream and blend to orange as they reach its feet which are goldenish orange. It has a uniform lead saddle and rump.

== 2026 ==
=== Likweli (Colobus congoensis) ===
A species of colobus from east-central Democratic Republic of the Congo (DRC) described by Hart et al. 2026.

== See also ==
- Primates described in the 2000s
- Primates described in the 2010s
- List of mammals described in 21st century
