= Lomami National Park =

National park in the Democratic Republic of the Congo

Lomami National Park Parc national de la Lomami
- Location within Democratic Republic of the Congo
- Location: Democratic Republic of Congo
- Nearest city: Kindu
- Coordinates: 2°0′S 25°18′E
- Area: 8,879 km^{2} (3,428 sq mi)
- Established: 2016
- Governing body: Institut Congolais pour la Conservation de la Nature

Lomami National Park (French: Parc national de la Lomami) is a national park located in the Democratic Republic of the Congo in Central Africa. Situated within the centre basin of the Lomami River, it straddles the Provinces of Tshopo and Maniema, with a slight overlap into the forests of the Tshuapa and Lualaba River basins. Lomami National Park was formally declared on 7 July 2016 as the ninth national park in the country and the first to be created since 1992.

Lomami National Park encompasses some 8,879 km^{2} (3,428 sq mi) of lowland tropical rainforest with some open-forest savanna islands to the south and more hilly terrain to the west. It is home to several endangered species including the bonobo (Pan paniscus), the okapi (Okapia johnstoni) and the Congo peafowl (Afropava congensis). It also harbours the lesula (Cercopithecus lomamiensis) and the Dryas monkey (Chlorocebus dryas) and the African forest elephant (Loxodonta cyclotis).

== History ==
The process to establish a national park got underway with meetings in village centers and town halls, with outreach missions led by ministers, chiefs and deputies From 2010 through 2012, legitimized through Tambiko ceremonies in which the ancestors were consulted, the surrounding villages defined the limits of the national park. By 2013 the governors of both Maniema and Tshopo Provinces declared provincial parks, making all hunting within the parks illegal. On 7 July 2016, Lomami National Park was officially decreed by DR Congo's national government.

== Geography ==
Lomami National Park is located in the two provinces Tshopo and Maniema between Kisangani and Kindu. The Lomami River forms the western border at the southern limit of the park and flows through the center of its northern part. This river is a biogeographic barrier and has influenced the evolution of wildlife in the region. The Tshuapa and Lualaba Rivers define the general east-west limits of the Tshuapa–Lomami–Lualaba Conservation Landscape. Edaphic savannas emerge from the forest in the southernmost part of the landscape, whereas forest cover is more consistent in the north, although varying from hill-forest to low elevation upland forest to seasonally flooded forest and riverine forest.

== Biodiversity ==
Lomami National Park is home to populations of the Okapi, Congo peafowl, African forest elephant and significant populations of many primate species including the rare dryas monkey. The lesula (Cercopithecus lomamiensis) was discovered in 2007. The bonobo population in Lomami National Park is genetically distinct from other bonobo populations, establishing the Lomami River as a probable geographic barrier.

The Grey parrot (Psittacus erithacus) and the Congo peafowl (Afropava congolensis) inhabit the forests throughout Lomami National Park.

Lomami National Park also harbours the following species:

- Tshuapa red colobus (Procolobus tholloni)
- Lomami red colobus (Piliocolobus parmentieri)
- Angola colobus (Colobus angolensis)
- Black crested mangabey (Lophocebus aterrimus)
- Red-tailed monkey (Cercopithecus ascanius)
- De Brazza's monkey (Cercopithecus neglectus)
- Blue monkey (Cercopithecus mitis)
- Wolf's mona monkey (Cercopithecus wolfi)
- Likweli (Colobus congoensis)

== Ethnic groups ==
The people living in the buffer zone of the Lomami National Park belong primarily to seven different ethnic groups: Lengola, Mbole, Mituku, Langa, Tetela, Ngengele and Arabisé. The approximately 100 small villages live primarily on agriculture, hunting, and fishing.

== Threats ==
Elephant poaching represents a threat to the park, and commercial ivory trade pushes a rapid decline of the elephant population. The major threat to wildlife in the Lomami National Park is the commercial bushmeat trade. The Lukuru Foundation found that the origin of hunting pressure is not just the local communities, as many hunters are from other regions.
