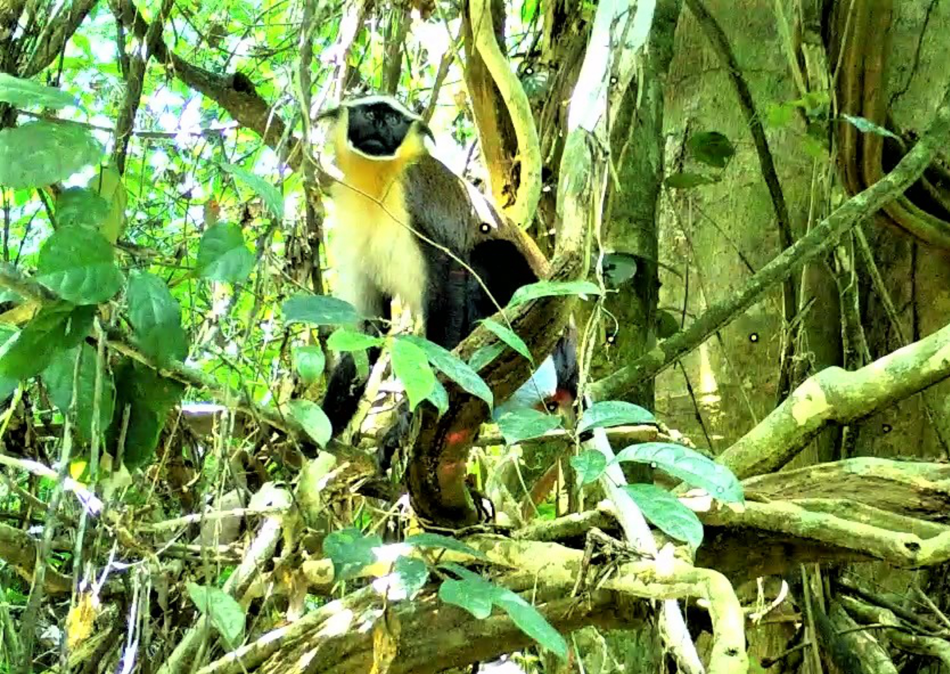

Conservation status
- Endangered (IUCN 3.1)

Scientific classification
- Kingdom: Animalia
- Phylum: Chordata
- Class: Mammalia
- Order: Primates
- Family: Cercopithecidae
- Genus: Chlorocebus
- Species: C. dryas

Binomial name
- Chlorocebus dryas (Schwarz, 1932)
- Geographic range of first-known population (a second population is to the southeast, near the edge of the square)

Synonyms
- Cercopithecus salongo Thys van den Audenaerde, 1977; Cercopithecus dryas

= Dryas monkey =

Species of Old World monkey

The Dryas monkey (Chlorocebus dryas), also known as Salonga monkey, ekele, or inoko, is a little-known species of Old World monkey found only in the Congo Basin, restricted to the left bank of the Congo River. It is now established that the animals that had been classified as Cercopithecus salongo (the common name being Zaire Diana monkey) were in fact Dryas monkeys. Some older sources treat the Dryas monkey as a subspecies of the Diana monkey and classify it as C. diana dryas, but it is geographically isolated from any known Diana monkey population.

While the Dryas monkey had been considered data deficient, evidence suggests it is very rare and its total population possibly numbers fewer than 200 individuals. Consequently, its status was changed to critically endangered in the 2008 IUCN Red List. Along with being listed by the IUCN, this species is also listed on Appendix II of CITES. However, in January 2019 the IUCN status was changed to endangered following the discovery of this species at eight locations in Lomami National Park.

== Taxonomy ==
While previously considered a member of the genus Cercopithecus, recent genetic studies indicates that it is instead a basal member of the Chlorocebus clade. However, it may potentially warrant its own genus.

== Physical description ==
An adult male Dryas monkey is characterized by its black muzzle, white whiskers, and short, white facial beard. The dorsal surface of its body, along with the coronal crown, is a grayish chestnut color. This species also has white on the ventral side of its body, tail, the bottom portion of the limbs, and the buttocks. The upper portion of the limbs resembles a similar color to the rest of its body, being a dark-grey/black-brown color.

Adult females and offspring have smaller portions of their bodies that are white in color; the white color is not present around their shoulder areas or their buttocks. Another difference in coloration is present in the upper portion of the arms, which are lighter in color as compared to the males. Body size varies from 40 to 55 cm, with a tail an additional 50–75 cm. Adults weigh between 4 and 7 kg, with marked sexual dimorphism.

== Ecology ==
This species prefers secondary forest locations. Although secondary forests are said to be preferred, these monkeys may also inhabit lowlands, rivers, or swampy areas of the Congo.

The diet of the Dryas is said to be made up of mostly plant foods, including fruits, young leaves, and flowers. Due to most of these foods being seasonal, this species also consumes small invertebrates, such as insects, as a supplement.

== Behaviour ==
This species is very social, and lives in groups that are either made up of their own species exclusively or within groups of mixed species. Visual and oral communication is very important, whether communicating to other Dryas monkeys or to other species. When living exclusively amongst each other, troops are made up of up to 30 individuals. Troops include many young offspring and females, but only contain one male. When females reproduce, they have only one young, and the gestation period lasts five months. Offspring are fully mature and ready to reproduce themselves after three years of life. The expected lifespan in the wild is 10–15 years, and because currently no Dryas monkeys are in captivity, that lifespan is unknown. Their movement occurs with a gait pattern involving all four limbs (quadrupedal).

As communication is very important to this species, they have a unique way of communicating with one another. An example is staring, which is a display used as a threat. The eyes stay fixed as the eyebrows rise and the scalp is retracted. The facial skin becomes stretched and the ears move back. These movements expose the eyelids, which are a different color and heavily contrasts with their facial color. Staring with open mouth is another threat expression that often goes along with head-bobbing. Head-bobbing, another threat display, is thought to be more aggressive. Presenting behavior is used by females during the mating season, showing males they are ready to mate.

== Conservation ==
The IUCN estimates only 200 individuals are left, although because the species is rarely spotted, an actual number is not known, leading this species to be listed as critically endangered. Few speculations are given as to why this species has declined so rapidly and is not showing much progress towards making a comeback. Some reasons include: poaching of the species for meat, habitat loss due to logging and other human activity, and the lack of information and knowledge of this species makes them more susceptible to dangers.

The community-managed Kokolopori Reserve in the north-eastern Democratic Republic of the Congo was initially considered a key to its survival and the only conservation efforts for the species. A second population, about 400 km (250 mi) from the first and partially protected by the Lomami National Park, was discovered in 2014.
