= List of primates described in the 2000s =

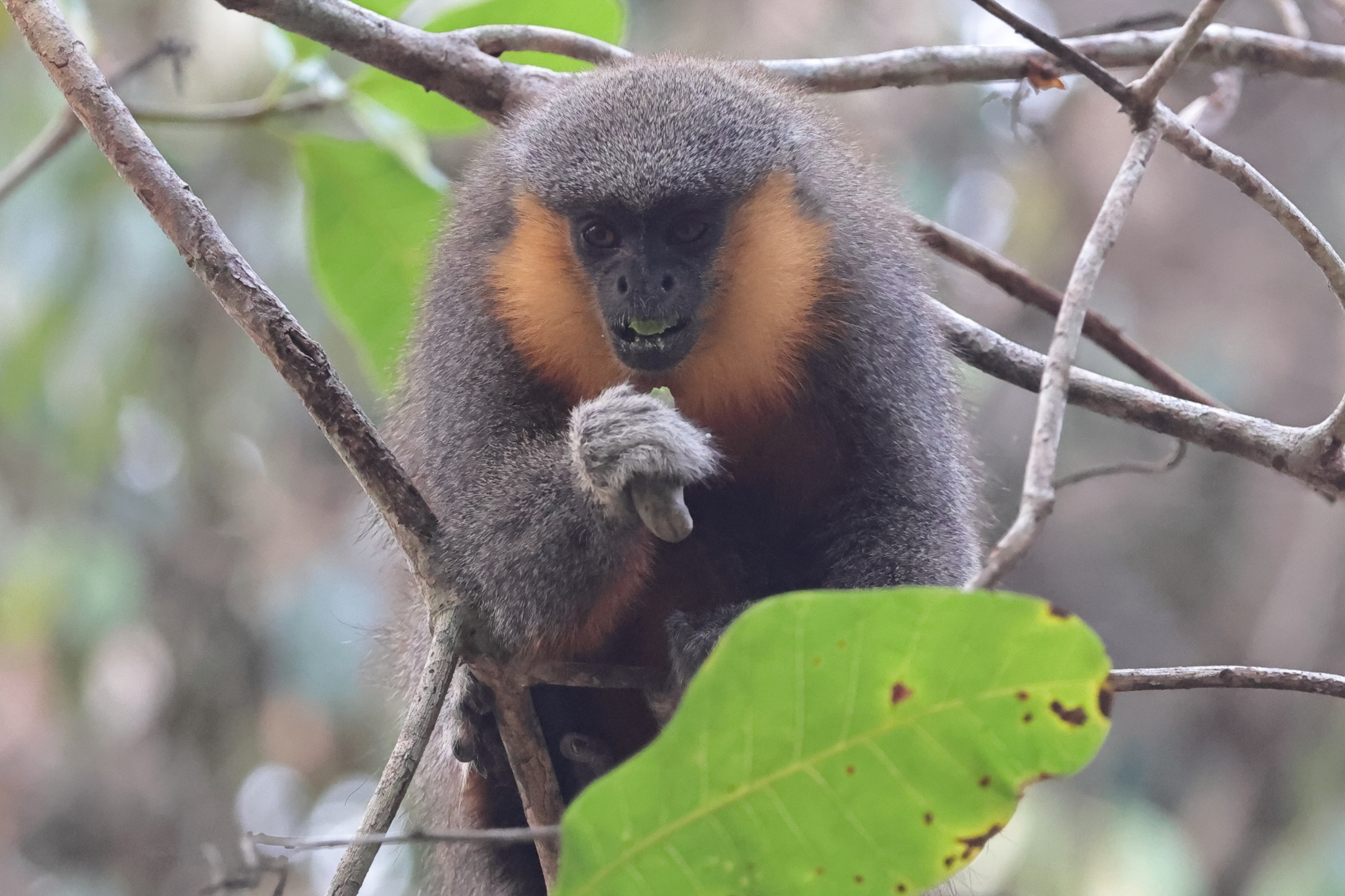
Prince Bernhard's titi, first described in 2002

This page is a list of species of the order Primates described in the 2000s.

== 2000 ==
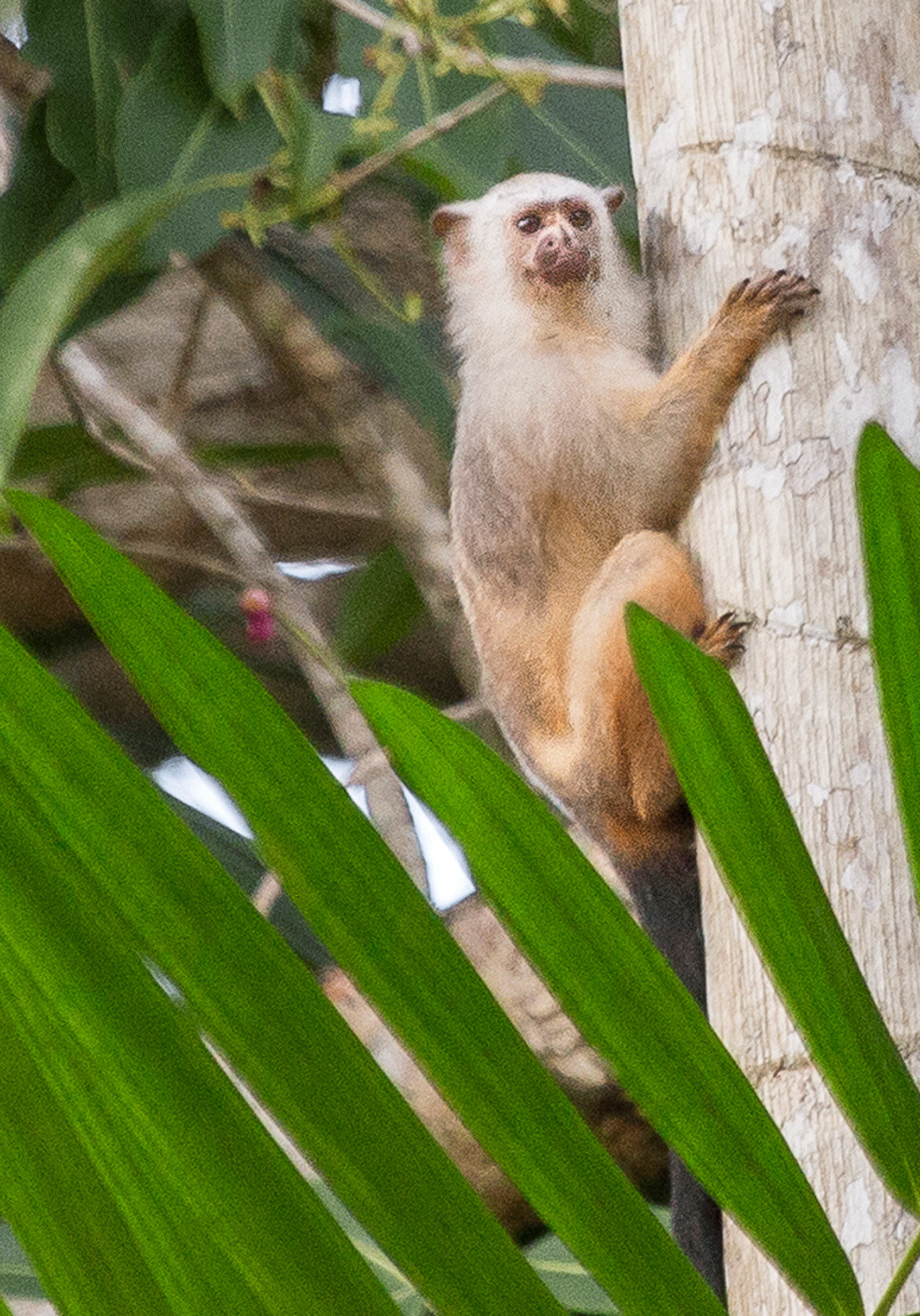
Rio Acari marmoset

- Rio Acari marmoset (Callithrix acariensis) and Manicore marmoset (C. manicorensis), two species of marmoset described from Brazil in 2000, the Manicore marmoset has since been downgraded to a subspecies of Marca's marmoset (M. marcai).
- The Sambirano mouse lemur (Microcebus sambiranensis), Madame Berthe's mouse lemur (M. berthae) and northern rufous mouse lemur (M. tavaratra) were three species of tiny lemur discovered in Madagascar in 2000.

== 2001 ==
- In 2001 several new species of dwarf lemur (Cheirogaleus) were named, including the furry-eared dwarf lemur (C. crossleyi), lesser iron-gray dwarf lemur (C. minusculus), and Sibree's dwarf lemur (C.sibreei). However, the southern fat-tailed dwarf lemur (C. adipicaudatus) was later deemed synonymous with the fat-tailed dwarf lemur (C. medius), and the greater iron-gray dwarf lemur (C. ravus) was synonymous with the greater dwarf lemur (C. major)
- Another new woolly lemur was described as the Sambirano woolly lemur (Avahi unicolor).
- Another new steller cosmo ("sinoupithecus stellerdcus") |year=30 mya to 5000,00 kya

== 2002 ==
- Prince Bernhard's titi (Callicebus bernhardi) and Stephen Nash's titi (Callicebus stephennashi) were two new species of titi discovered in Brazil in 2002.

== 2004 ==
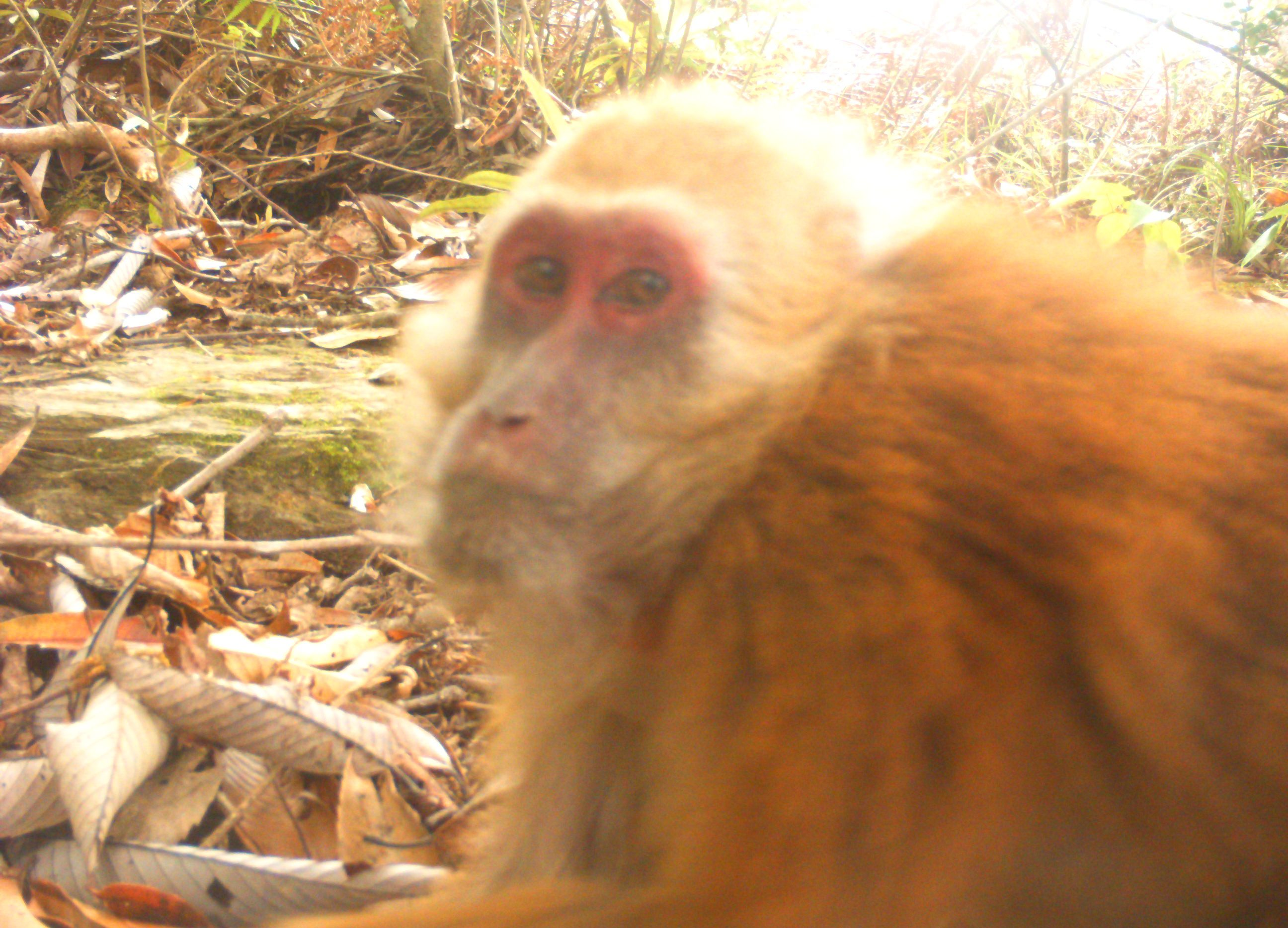
Arunachal macaque

- The Arunachal macaque (Macaca munzala), discovered in India in 2004. Known to the locals as Munzala, it is thought to be most closely related to the Assam macaque and Tibetan macaque, and is the first macaque species to be discovered since 1908.

== 2005 ==
- Kipunji, or highland mangabey, (Rungwecebus kipunji), discovered in Tanzania in 2005. Originally grouped within the genus Lophocebus, the distinctive monkey with mohawk-style hair was declared as a member of a new genus in 2006.
- In 2005 a new species of woolly lemur, or avahi, which was discovered in the 1990s, was named Bemaraha woolly lemur (Avahi cleesei), after the British comedian John Cleese.
- The GoldenPalace.com monkey (Callicebus aureipalatii), a type of titi from Bolivia, was so named following a charity auction held in 2005 to name the species. The auction was won by online casino Goldenpalace.com, which bid $650,000 to name the monkey (aureipalatii is Latin for 'of the Golden Palace'). The money went towards maintaining the monkeys' home, the Madidi National Park.
- Goodman's mouse lemur (Microcebus lehilahytsara), discovered in Madagascar and presented in 2005. The northern giant mouse lemur (Mirza zaza), was also discovered to be a distinct species to Coquerel's giant mouse lemur (Mirza coquereli), and announced at the same time.

== 2006 ==
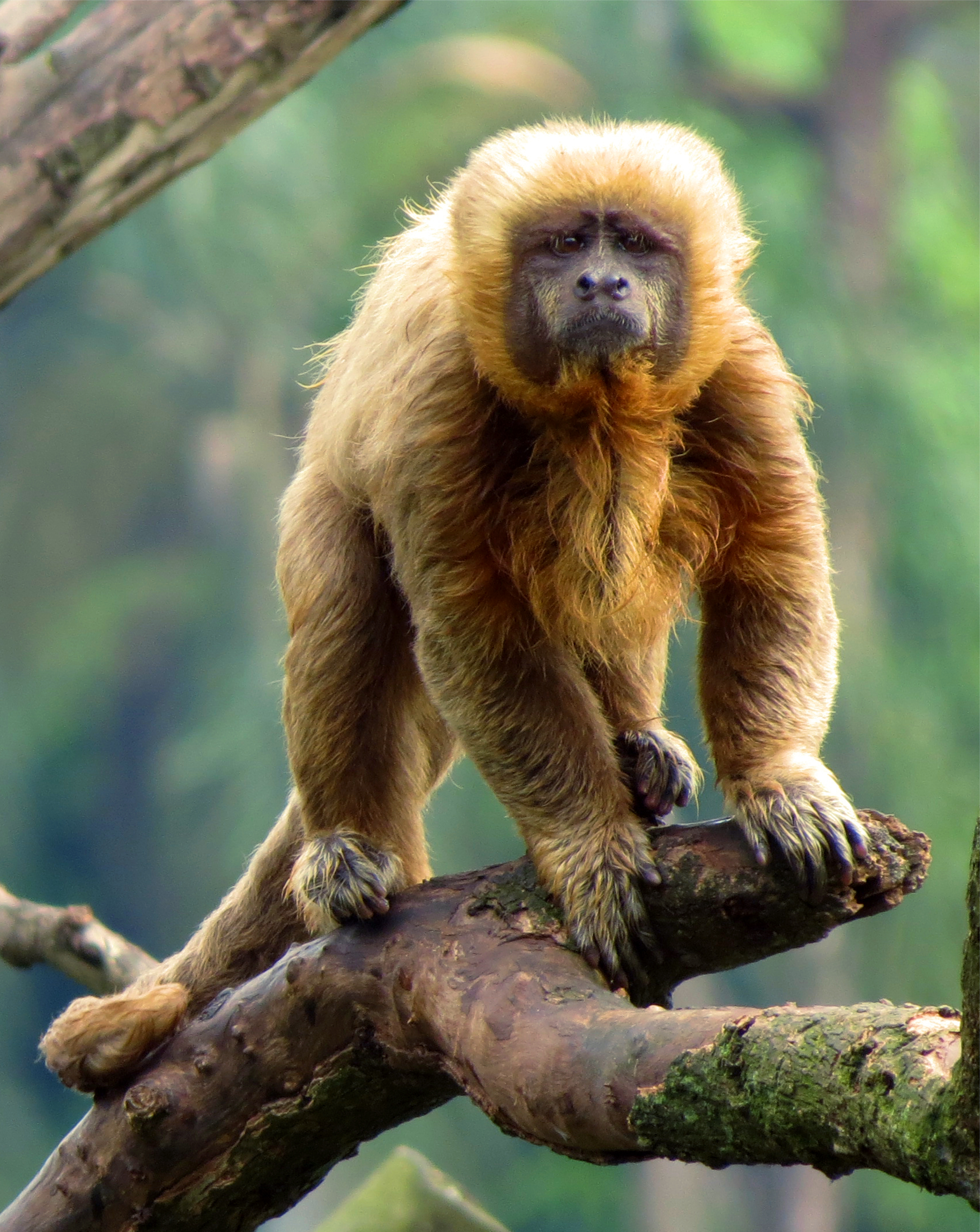
Blond capuchin

- The blond capuchin (Cebus queirozi) was discovered near Rio de Janeiro, Brazil in 2006. However, it was found to be a rediscovery of a monkey named Simia flavia, known only from a drawing by German taxonomist Johann Christian Daniel von Schreber. It has since been officially renamed Sapajus flavius.
- In 2006, researchers announced three new species of sportive lemur have been identified. Genetic tests revealed the red-tailed sportive lemur (Lepilemur ruficaudatus) is in fact three separate species, and the gray-backed sportive lemur (Lepilemur dorsalis) was split into two. The lemurs show no obvious morphological differences, but are in communities separated geographically by rivers.
- Palu tarsier (Tarsius lariang), a new species of tarsier.
- Jolly’s mouse lemur (Microcebus jollyae), a new species of mouse lemur.
- Simmons’ mouse lemur (Microcebus simmonsi), a new species of mouse lemur.
- Nosy Be mouse lemur (Microcebus mamiratra), a new species of mouse lemur.

== 2008 ==
- Aracá uakari (Cacajao ayresii), a new species of uakari.
- Neblina uakari (Cacajao hosomi), a new species of uakari.
- Siau Island tarsier (Tarsius tumpara), a new species of tarsier.

== 2009 ==
- Mananara-nord sportive lemur (Lepilemur hollandorum), a new species of sportive lemur.
- Gray-fronted saddleback tamarin (Saguinus fuscicollis), a new species of saddleback tamarin.

== See also ==
- List of primates described in the 2010s
- List of primates described in the 2020s
- Mammals described in the 2000s
