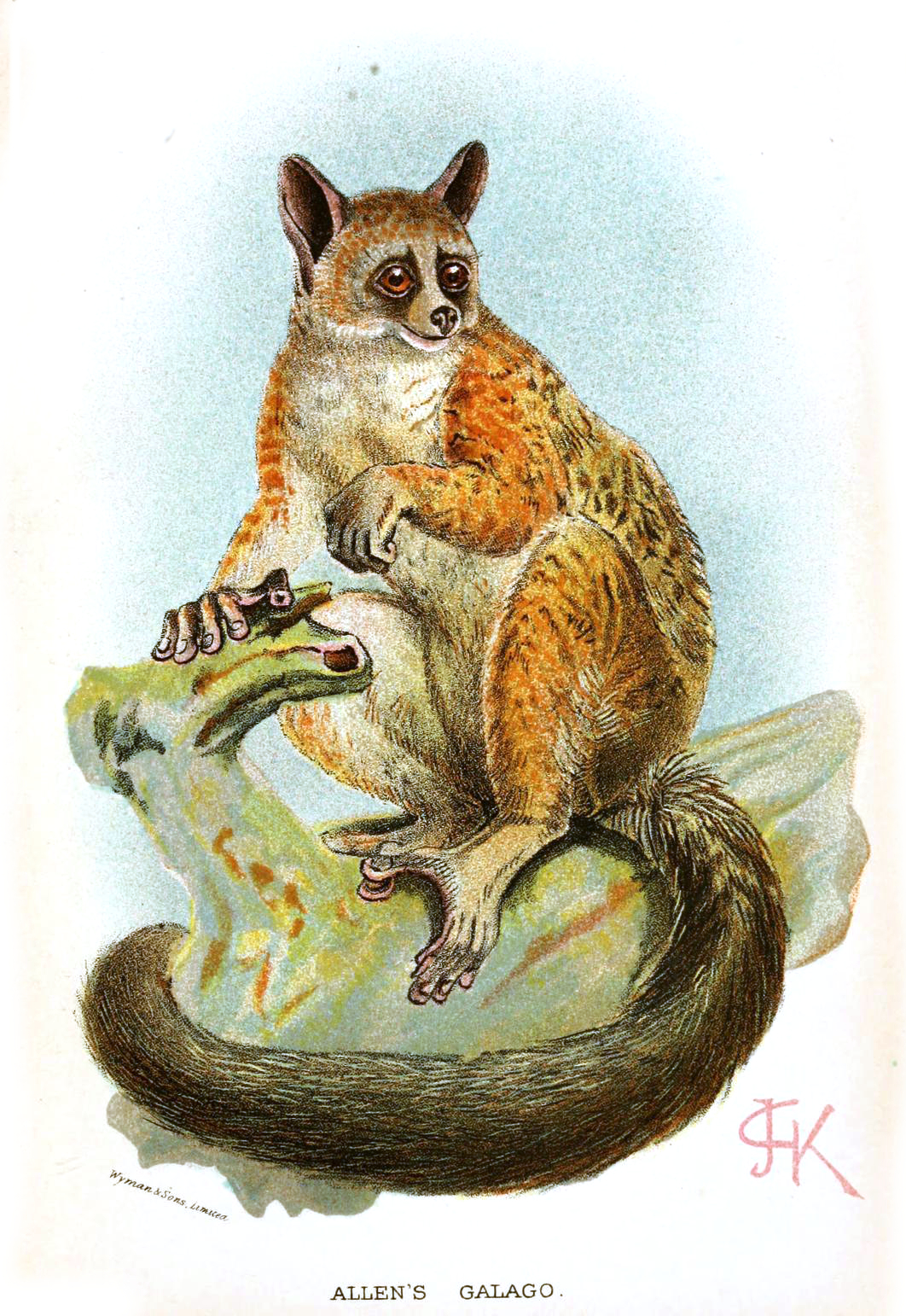
- Bioko Allen's bushbaby (S. alleni)

Scientific classification
- Kingdom: Animalia
- Phylum: Chordata
- Class: Mammalia
- Order: Primates
- Suborder: Strepsirrhini
- Family: Galagidae
- Genus: Sciurocheirus; J. E. Gray, 1872

Type species
- Galago alleni Waterhouse, 1838

Species
- Sciurocheirus alleni Sciurocheirus gabonensis Sciurocheirus makandensis

= Squirrel galago =

Sciurocheirus

Species of primate

The squirrel galagos are a group of four species of strepsirrhine primates. They are classified in the genus Sciurocheirus of the family Galagidae.

Originally a single species was described, Galago alleni, by Waterhouse (1838), and the species was placed in a separate genus, Sciurocheirus by Gray in 1863. While some listings still included them in Galago, the species was split into three taxa, alleni, cameronensis, and gabonensis by Eisentraut (1973) and Groves (1989) which were then later elevated to species status by Groves (2001) as S. alleni, S. cameronensis, and S. gabonensis and followed by Groves (2005) and Nekaris (2013). The IUCN and American Society of Mammalogists both list S. cameronensis as a subspecies of S. alleni (as listed below). In 2013, another species, S. makandensis was described.

Genus Sciurocheirus – Gray, 1872 – three species
| Common name | Scientific name and subspecies | Range | Size and ecology | IUCN status and estimated population |
|---|---|---|---|---|
| Bioko Allen's bushbaby | S. alleni (Waterhouse, 1838) Two subspecies: S. a. alleni (Bioko Allen's bushbaby); S. a. cameronensis (Cross River bushbaby) | Western equatorial Africa | Size: 15–24 cm (6–9 in) long, plus 20–30 cm (8–12 in) tail Habitat: Forest Diet: Fruit, as well as insects and small mammals | NT Unknown |
| Gabon bushbaby | S. gabonensis (Gray, 1863) | Western equatorial Africa | Size: 18–21 cm (7–8 in) long, plus 23–28 cm (9–11 in) tail Habitat: Forest Diet: Arthropods, insects, fruit, and gum | LC Unknown |
| Makandé squirrel galago | S. makandensis Ambrose, 2013 | Gabon in western equatorial Africa | Size: Unknown Habitat: Forest Diet: Unknown | DD Unknown |

== Sources ==
- Kingdon, Jonathan (2020). The Kingdon Pocket Guide to African Mammals (2nd ed.). Bloomsbury Publishing. ISBN 978-1-4729-8320-6.
- Kingdon, Jonathan; Happold, David; Butynski, Thomas; Hoffmann, Michael; Happold, Meredith; Kalina, Jan, eds. (2013). Mammals of Africa. Vol. 2. Bloomsbury Publishing. ISBN 978-1-4081-8996-2.
- Stuart, Chris; Stuart, Mathilde (2017). Stuarts' Field Guide to the Larger Mammals of Africa (4th ed.). Penguin Random House South Africa. ISBN 978-1-77584-276-7.
