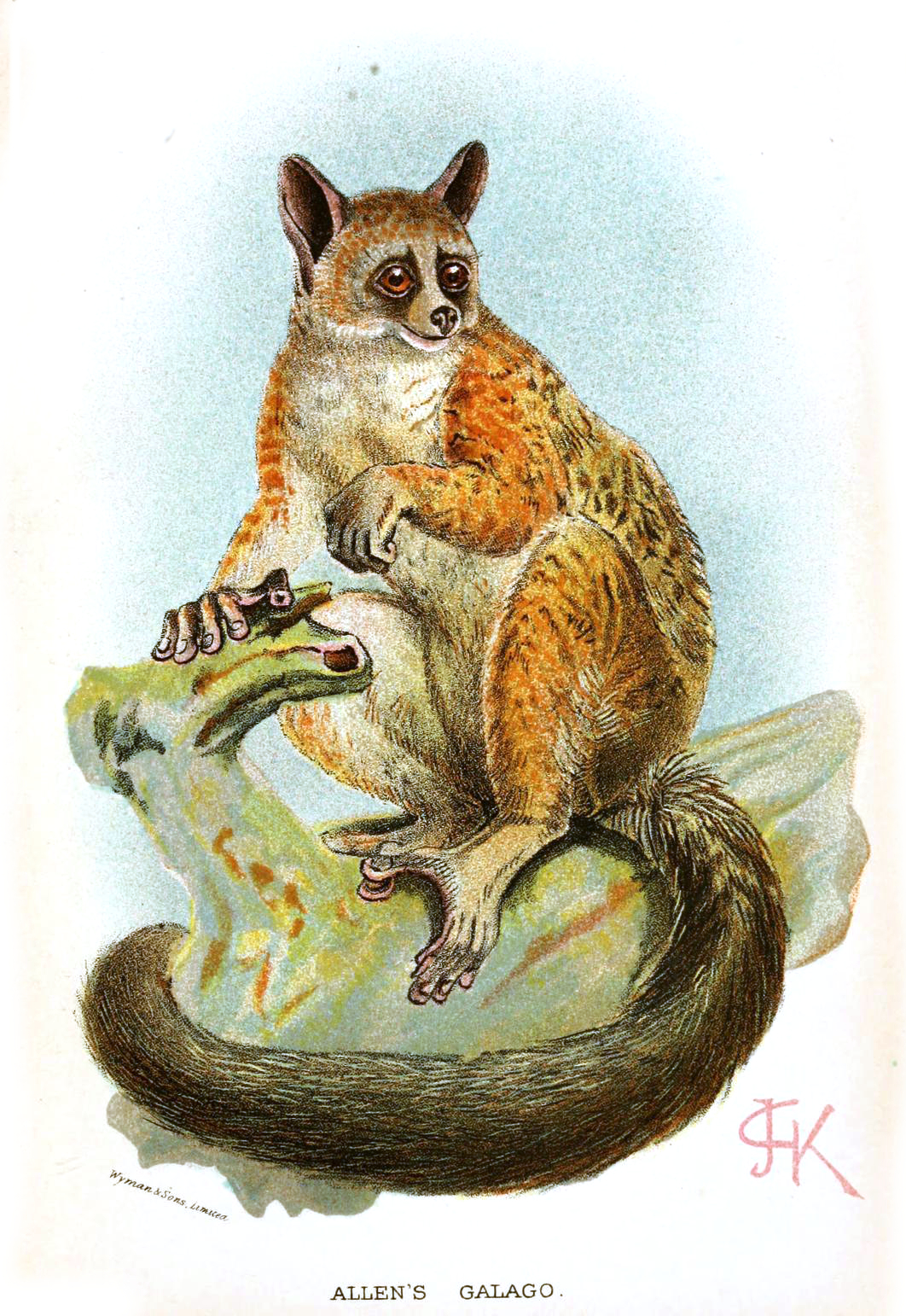

Conservation status
- Near Threatened (IUCN 3.1)

Scientific classification
- Kingdom: Animalia
- Phylum: Chordata
- Class: Mammalia
- Infraclass: Placentalia
- Order: Primates
- Suborder: Strepsirrhini
- Family: Galagidae
- Genus: Sciurocheirus
- Species: S. alleni

Binomial name
- Sciurocheirus alleni (Waterhouse, 1838)
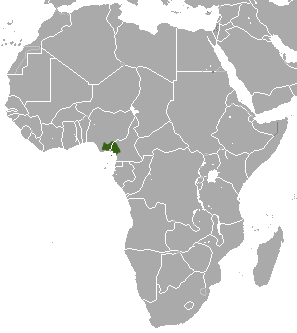
- Bioko Allen's bushbaby range

= Bioko Allen's bushbaby =

Species of primate

Bioko Allen's bushbaby (Sciurocheirus alleni), also known as the Bioko squirrel galago, is a species of primate in the galago family found in Cameroon, Nigeria, and the island of Bioko, Equatorial Guinea. Its natural habitat is subtropical or tropical dry forests. The bushbaby is currently near-threatened, according to the International Union for Conservation of Nature.

== Taxonomy ==
Originally described as Galago alleni by Waterhouse (1838), the species was placed in a separate genus, Sciurocheirus by Gray in 1863. The species was split into three taxa, alleni, cameronensis, and gabonensis by Eisentraut (1973) and Groves (1989) which were then later elevated to species status by Groves (2001) as S. alleni, S. cameronensis, and S. gabonensis and followed by Groves (2005) and Nekaris (2013).

== Physical description ==
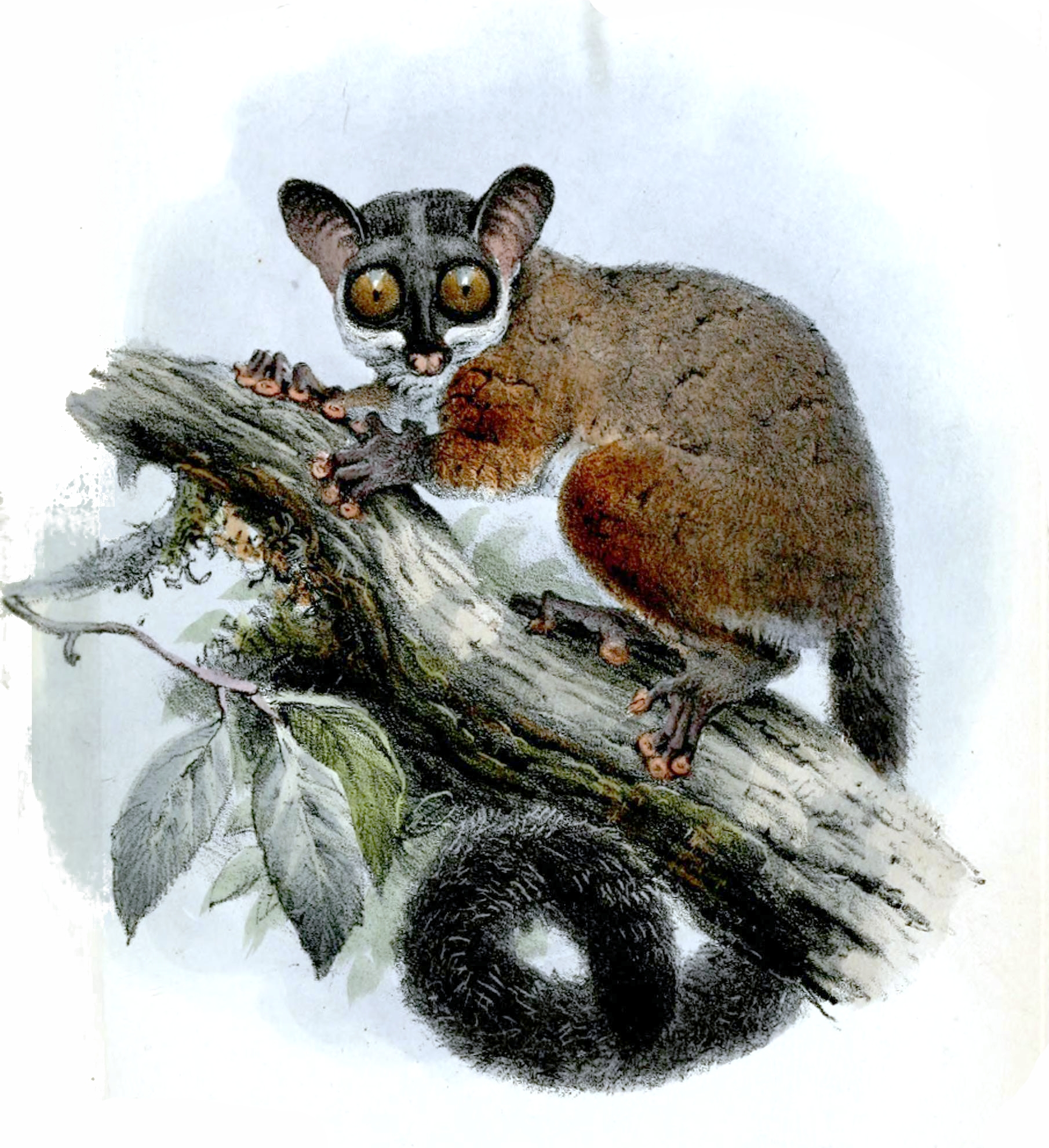
Galago alleni, 1863

Bioko Allen's bushbaby has a head-body length of 20–28 cm (7.9–11.0 in) with a 23–30 cm (9.1–11.8 in) tail and weighs 300–410 g (11–14 oz).
