= Likweli =

Scientific classification
- Kingdom: Animalia
- Phylum: Chordata
- Class: Mammalia
- Order: Primates
- Family: Cercopithecidae
- Genus: Colobus
- Species: C. congoensis

Binomial name
- Colobus congoensis Hart et al., 2026

Species of Old World monkey

The likweli (Colobus congoensis) is a species of Old World monkey in the colobine genus Colobus. It is endemic to a small area of lowland rainforest between the Lomami River and the Lilo River in east-central Democratic Republic of the Congo (DRC), most of which lies within Lomami National Park. Formally described in 2026, it is the seventh recognised species of Colobus and the fifth new species of African monkey to be described in the previous 75 years.

The monkey is smaller than most species of its genus and is mostly black. It is distinguished by a pinkish to orange-cream patch of bare skin around the mouth and nostrils, set against a dark face that includes a grayish mask around the eyes, and by a conspicuous white patch around the anus. Genetic, anatomical, and acoustic evidence identify its closest relative as the black colobus (Colobus satanas) of west-central Africa, more than 1,200 kilometres (750 mi) away. The likweli is estimated to have diverged from the black colobus approximately 5 million years ago, which is the deepest split known within the genus. Its discoverers have recommended that it be classified as endangered on the IUCN Red List.

== Taxonomy ==
Colobus congoensis was described in July 2026 in the journal PLOS One by a team led by John A. Hart, Junior D. Amboko, and Kate M. Detwiler, working with researchers from institutions including the Lukuru Wildlife Research Foundation, the Frankfurt Zoological Society, Florida Atlantic University, and Yale University. It is placed in the family Cercopithecidae, subfamily Colobinae, and genus Colobus, which was previously considered to contain six species.

The holotype is an adult male skin and skeleton (Yale Peabody Museum, YPM MAM 17307), with two adult females designated as paratypes; the specimens derive from dead individuals confiscated from hunters during park patrols. The type locality is on the east bank of the Lomami River in the Biondo Sector of Lomami National Park, Tshopo Province.

=== Etymology ===
The specific epithet congoensis refers to the restriction of the species to the Democratic Republic of the Congo; the authors have described it as, to their knowledge, the first primate named after the country. The recommended common name, likweli, is a vernacular name used by the Balanga people living west of the Lomami River. The Mituku communities at the eastern edge of its range instead call it kasaba nkoni, meaning 'the branch shaker'.

=== Phylogeny ===
Analysis of mitochondrial DNA recovered C. congoensis as the sister species to the black colobus (C. satanas), with the two together forming the sister lineage to all other Colobus species. Comparisons of skull and tooth anatomy and of roaring vocalizations likewise indicated a close relationship with C. satanas. Using fossil-calibrated estimates, the divergence between the two species was dated to approximately 5.0 million years ago (with a 95% highest posterior density interval of roughly 4.3–5.8 million years), representing the deepest divergence yet identified among Colobus monkeys.

== Description ==
Colobus congoensis is a small, long-tailed colobus with little difference in coat color between the sexes. The pelage of the body, limbs, and tail is black, with the longest hairs on the upper shoulders and back, which can produce a sheen and a cape-like appearance in some individuals. The most distinctive feature is a prominent patch of bare, pinkish to orange-cream skin surrounding the mouth and philtrum and extending to the lower parts of the nostrils, contrasting sharply with the otherwise black face; the dark grey skin over the cheekbones and temples gives the face a mask-like appearance. The ears are large, black, and folded at the margins. Both sexes have a well-defined white patch of skin around the anus. This patch is larger and hairless in females, and sparsely covered with fine white hairs in males.

A four-year comparative study by researchers, completed in 2026, recorded likweli mating calls and vocalizations. The analysis revealed that the species' vocalizations are highly distinct from those of other genus members.

The species is also smaller in body mass and skull size than all other members of the genus. It differs from the closely related black colobus, whose face is entirely black, by its pale facial patch, its extensive white perianal patch, its smaller size, its shorter back hair, and the absence of a tuft of long hair at the base of the tail.

== Distribution and habitat ==
The known range of C. congoensis covers approximately 1,700 km^{2} (660 sq mi) in the provinces of Tshopo and Maniema in east-central DRC, within the Tshuapa–Lomami–Lualaba (TL2) interfluve. It occurs from the east bank of the Lomami River eastward to the Lilo River, a tributary of the Congo River. Despite apparently suitable forest, it has not been found west of the Lomami. Recorded elevations range from approximately 390 to 500 m (1,280 to 1,640 ft) above sea level.

The monkey is largely confined to tall, closed-canopy forest growing on deep clay soils and to islands of terra firma forest, where it lives alongside two other colobine monkeys, the Lomami red colobus (Piliocolobus parmentieri) and the Angola colobus (Colobus angolensis). Most of its range lies inside Lomami National Park.

== Behaviour and ecology ==
Colobus congoensis is arboreal and lives in the forest canopy. It was most often seen in small groups averaging about six individuals, frequently in mixed-species associations with other monkeys. Researchers described it as quiet and difficult to observe, as rather than fleeing when encountered, groups tend to climb higher into the canopy and watch the researchers. Eight other primate species share its range, among them the bonobo (Pan paniscus).

Like other colobus monkeys, the species produces loud, deep roaring calls, heard most often around dawn. Its roars are structurally most similar to those of the black colobus, sharing a rapid pulse rate, high frequency, and frequency modulation, and may be distinguished from the roars of the sympatric Angola colobus by their pulse rate and by a characteristic snort between roaring sequences. Roaring was recorded in a range of contexts, including an intense bout during an attack by a crowned eagle (Stephanoaetus coronatus).

== Conservation ==
The describing authors proposed a preliminary status of endangered on the IUCN Red List scale, citing the very small range and population of the species, together with the anticipated effects of increasing hunting and habitat loss. They identified continued protection of Lomami National Park and cooperation with neighbouring communities to discourage hunting of the monkey as the most important measures for its survival.
