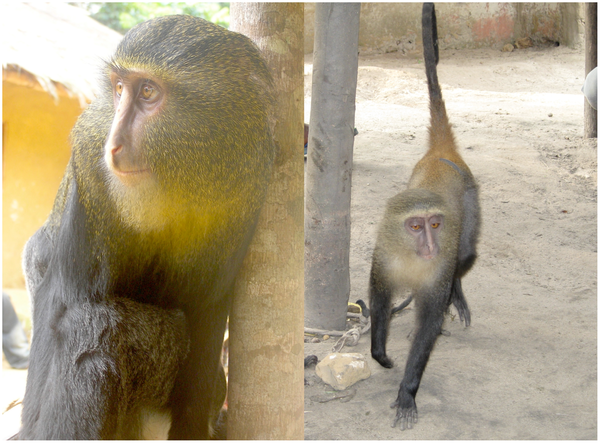

Conservation status
- Vulnerable (IUCN 3.1)

Scientific classification
- Kingdom: Animalia
- Phylum: Chordata
- Class: Mammalia
- Infraclass: Placentalia
- Order: Primates
- Family: Cercopithecidae
- Genus: Cercopithecus
- Species: C. lomamiensis

Binomial name
- Cercopithecus lomamiensis Hart et al., 2012

= Lesula =

Lesula monkey

Species of Old World monkey

The lesula (Cercopithecus lomamiensis) is a species of Old World monkey in the guenon genus Cercopithecus, found in the Lomami Basin of the Congo. Though known to locals, it was unknown to the international scientific community until it was discovered in 2007 and confirmed in a 2012 publication. The lesula is the second new species of African monkey to be discovered since 1984. This monkey is described to have human looking eyes and a blue bottom "...and adult males have a huge bare patch of skin in the buttocks, testicles and perianal area," said John A. Hart, the researcher who described the monkey. "It's a brilliant blue, really pretty spectacular."

The species was listed among the Top 10 New Species 2013 discovered in 2012 as selected by the International Institute for Species Exploration at Arizona State University out of more than 140 nominated species. Its distinctiveness is its human-like eyes, genital area and booming dawn chorus. The selection was declared on 22 May 2013.

== Distribution ==
Lesula booms

The lesula lives in rainforests in the Democratic Republic of Congo, with the 2007 specimen found in captivity in the village of Opala. Since that sighting, it has also been seen in the wild. Its range is between the Lomami and Tshuapa rivers in the central part of the country.

== Status ==
The lesula is vulnerable to hunting for bushmeat. Protecting the species could be challenging, as species with such a small range can go from vulnerable to seriously endangered in a few years. The lesula's range is within the Tshuapa–Lomami–Lualaba Conservation Landscape, and the Lomami National Park was created to protect this and other species in the region.

== Behavior ==
The lesula are generally described by researchers as quiet and shy. They also tend to usually live in small family groups of around five members or less. The Lesula's days consist of leisurely activities such as foraging for fruits and vegetation, grooming, and resting.
