= Sciurocheirus makandensis =

Makandé squirrel galago

Conservation status
- Data Deficient (IUCN 3.1)

Scientific classification
- Kingdom: Animalia
- Phylum: Chordata
- Class: Mammalia
- Infraclass: Placentalia
- Order: Primates
- Suborder: Strepsirrhini
- Family: Galagidae
- Genus: Sciurocheirus
- Species: S. makandensis

Binomial name
- Sciurocheirus makandensis Ambrose, 2013
- Sciurocheirus makandensis range

Species of mammal

Sciurocheirus makandensis (Makandé squirrel galago) is a species of squirrel galago native to Gabon, Africa.
