= Angolan dwarf galago =

Conservation status
- Near Threatened (IUCN 3.1)

Scientific classification
- Kingdom: Animalia
- Phylum: Chordata
- Class: Mammalia
- Infraclass: Placentalia
- Order: Primates
- Suborder: Strepsirrhini
- Family: Galagidae
- Genus: Galagoides
- Species: G. kumbirensis

Binomial name
- Galagoides kumbirensis Svensson et al., 2017

Species of mammal

The Angolan dwarf galago (Galagoides kumbirensis) is a species of dwarf galago native to Angola, and was named after western Angolan Kumbira Forest. Though 36 individuals of the Angolan dwarf galago were identified in September 2013, it was declared as a new species in 2017, and is now the nineteenth species of galago to be identified. Its call, described as "A loud chirping crescendo of longer notes, followed by a fading twitter", was enough to separate it as a new species, without any genetic identification, due to its uniqueness.

It is by far the largest of its family, with a head-body length of 6.7–7.9 inches (17–20 cm) and a tail length of 6.7–9.5 inches (17–24 cm). It is greyish brown in colour and has a darker tail.

Though the species' status in the wild has not been formally identified, it is likely endangered due to large amounts of deforestation around its habitat area.
