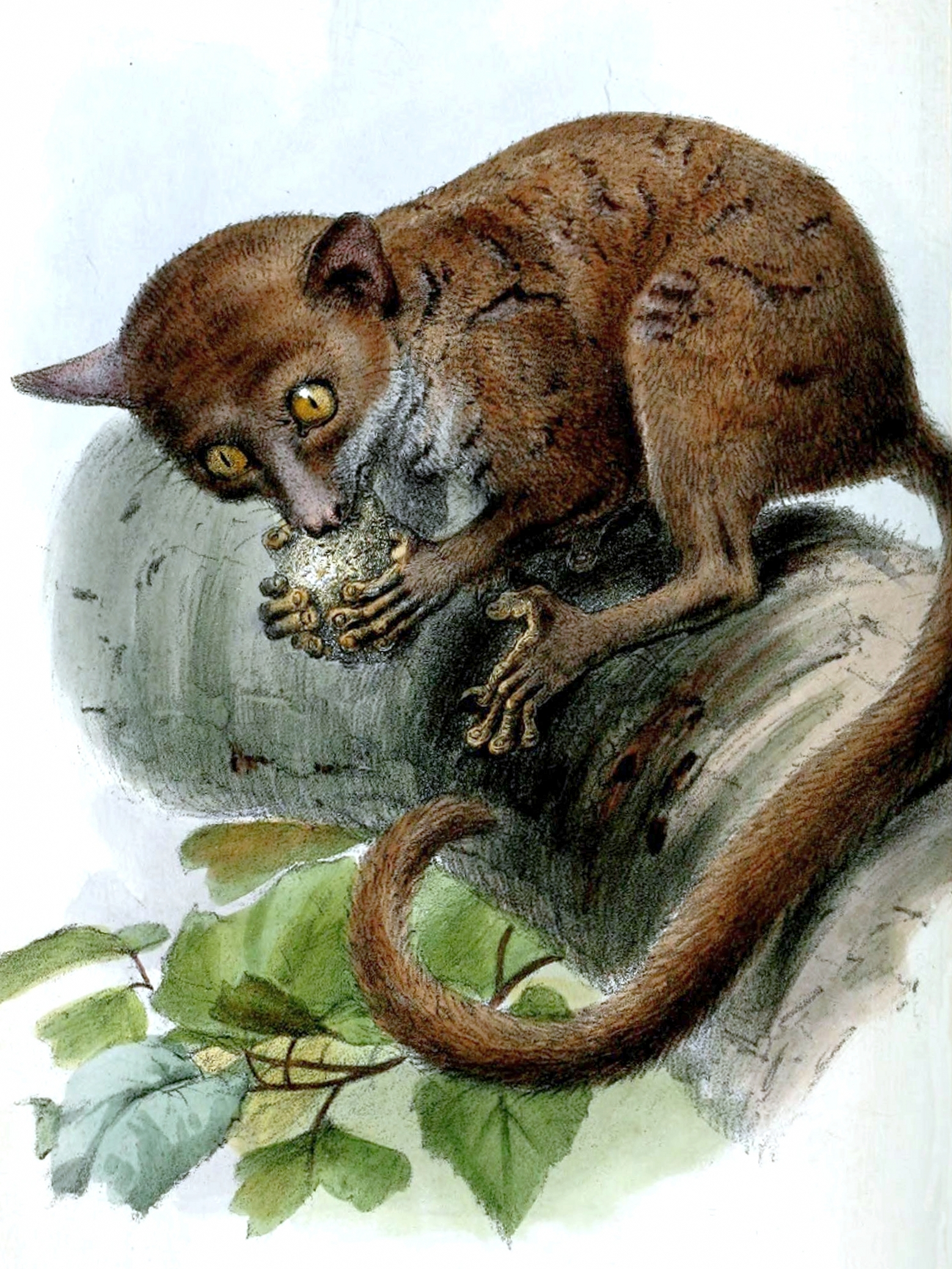

Conservation status
- Least Concern (IUCN 3.1)

Scientific classification
- Kingdom: Animalia
- Phylum: Chordata
- Class: Mammalia
- Order: Primates
- Suborder: Strepsirrhini
- Family: Galagidae
- Genus: Galagoides
- Species: G. demidovii

Binomial name
- Galagoides demidovii (G. Fischer, 1806)
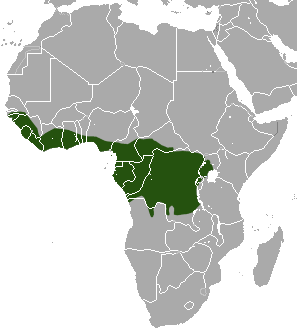
- Prince Demidoff's Bushbaby range

Synonyms
- Galago demidoff

= Prince Demidoff's bushbaby =

Species of primate

Prince Demidoff's bushbaby (Galagoides demidovii), also known as Prince Demidoff's galago, is a species of primate in the family Galagidae. It is native to parts of tropical West and Central Africa.

== Description ==
Prince Demidoff's bushbaby grows to a head-and-body length of 73 to 155 mm (2.9 to 6.1 in), with a tail of 110 to 215 mm (4.3 to 8.5 in). The head is narrow with a pointed muzzle and variable colouring round the eyes. The upper parts are reddish-brown, the underparts are paler and the tail is not bushy.

== Distribution and habitat ==
The species is found in Angola, Benin, Burkina Faso, Burundi, Cameroon, Central African Republic, Republic of the Congo, Democratic Republic of the Congo, Ivory Coast, Equatorial Guinea, Gabon, Ghana, Guinea, Liberia, Mali, Nigeria, Rwanda, Sierra Leone, Tanzania, Togo, Uganda, possibly Kenya, and possibly Malawi. Habitats include both primary and secondary forest as well as swampy forests, mangrove areas, gallery forests and mixed habitats in the Upper Guinean forest zone. It is adaptable and tolerates a certain amount of habitat degradation.

== Ecology ==
Like other galagos, Prince Demidoff's bushbaby is nocturnal and arboreal. During the day it sleeps in a nest made of dense vegetation or leaves some 5 to 40 m (16 to 131 ft) off the ground. At night it forages for insects, mostly beetles and moths, and also feeds on fruit and gum exudate. It can make horizontal bounds of up to 2 m (7 ft). The male has a home range of 0.5 to 2.7 hectares (1.2 to 6.7 acres), which may overlap the smaller home ranges of several females. There is intense competition among males during the breeding season. Females usually have one pregnancy per year, with a gestation period of about 112 days. The female will often hide the baby in the undergrowth during the night while she forages and take it back to the nest in the morning. Weaning takes place at about six weeks and maturity is reached at about nine months.

== Predation ==
Predators of Prince Demidoff’s bushbabies in Cameroon include Jameson's mambas.
