= Tshuapa–Lomami–Lualaba Conservation Landscape =

Region in Democratic Republic of Congo

Coordinates: 0.6908°S 21.6928°E

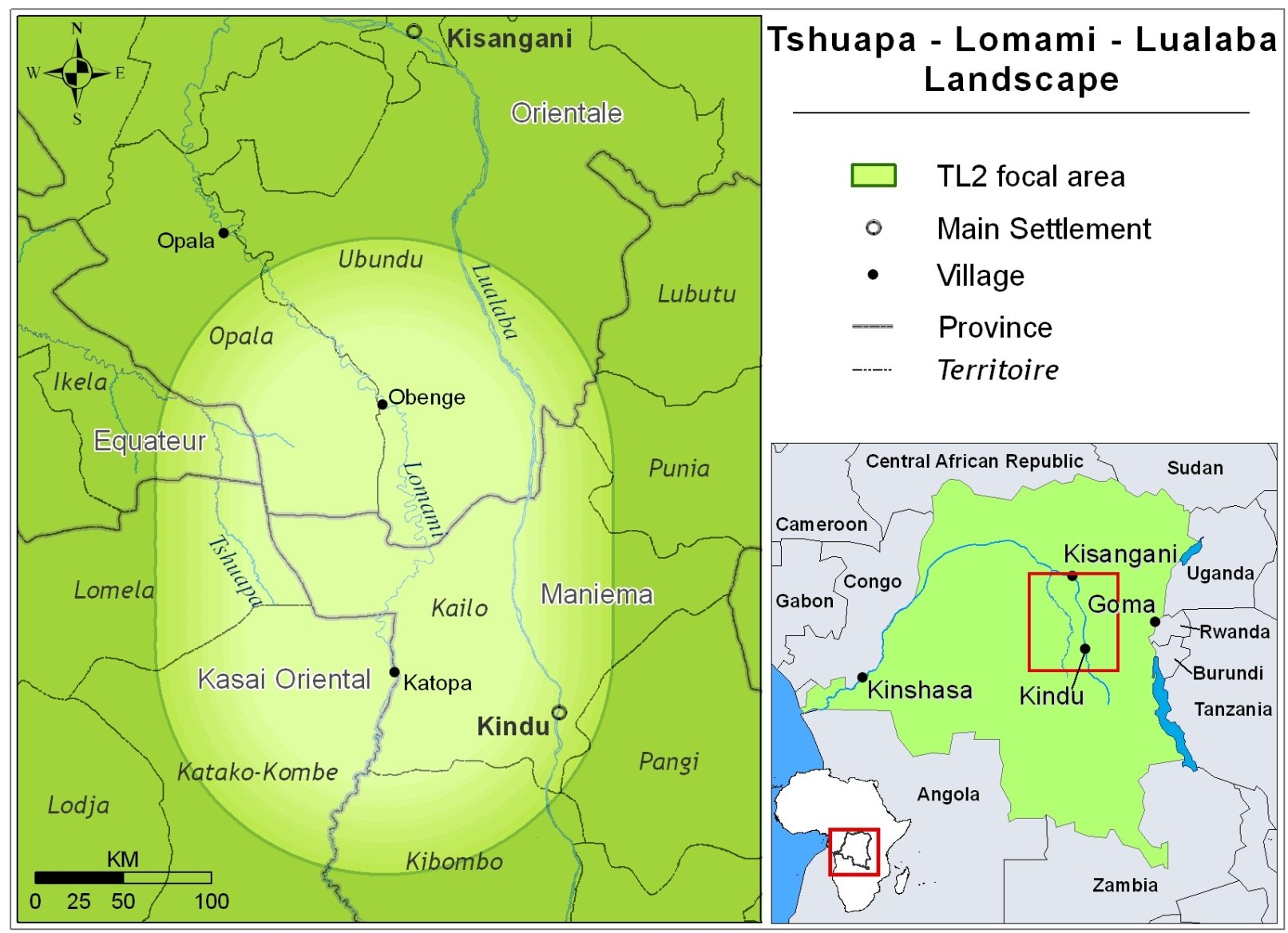
A Map of the TL2 Landscape.

The Tshuapa–Lomami–Lualaba Conservation Landscape (TL2) was until very recently a remarkably unknown forested region in central Democratic Republic of Congo.

== Geography ==
This landscape is known by three principal rivers, the Tshuapa, the Lomami, and the Congo River, known here as the Lualaba, giving the region its name: TL2. The Tshuapa and Lualaba are its western and eastern borders; the Lomami River flows through its center. This region covers over 40,000 km^{2} and is one of the largest blocks of intact forest in DRCongo. It has both low human population densities and little immigration.

== Fauna ==
The most important populations of key fauna, including bonobo and elephant, occur in a central area that can be divided into three linked conservation sectors. There are two primary conservation sectors, one in Tshopo Province and one in Maniema Province (which were respectively the western and south-western districts of former Orientale Province). Along with a third smaller sector in Kasaï-Oriental, surveys show that this region holds a major population of Congo's great ape, the bonobo, as well as the last significant elephant population between the Tshuapa and the Lualaba rivers. The concentrations of these two flagship species also correspond with the highest concentrations of many other large mammals, including primates, throughout this continuously forested landscape.

The forests in the Lomami-Lualaba watersheds are the eastern range limit of Congo’s endemic great ape, the bonobo (Pan Paniscus). Bonobos are found throughout most of TL2, though occurrence is patchy and bonobos are uncommon in some areas where they are present. The largest concentrations of bonobos are found in the south of the landscape, toward the forest-savanna ecotone. Bonobos were recorded in only a few scattered locations in surveys outside the area defined as the TL2 Conservation Landscape, and the evidence suggests populations are small and scattered. Based on interviews with hunters and villagers, bonobos have disappeared from some of these areas over the last two decades as hunting levels increased.

Forest elephants in the landscape are now restricted mainly to a single area in the watershed of the Tutu River, a tributary of the Lomami. It is an area of approximately 5000 km^{2}, and only a scattering of elephants, all highly mobile, occur elsewhere in the landscape. There is a reasonable prognosis for maintenance of forest elephants over the long term, but existing populations were nearly decimated after a decade of intense poaching, associated with the war and the widespread availability of military-grade firearms.

Okapi occur on both sides of the Lomami River, representing an extension of the species’ known range. Okapi are, however, uncommon in the landscape.

=== Primates ===
Several species or subspecies of primates are limited in their distribution to the TL2 landscape region.

A new species of primate, known vernacularly as the lesula, was discovered in this region in 2007. The lesula is most closely related to the owl-faced monkey, Cercopithecus hamlyni. Significant work was subsequently undertaken over the next five years to complete the taxonomic classification of the new species and confirm the importance and significance of the discovery.

On 13 September 2012, the discovery of the lesula (Cercopithecus lomamiensis) was announced to have been confirmed. The final classification of the species was based primarily on genomic evidence.
