= Cross River bushbaby =

Conservation status
- Near Threatened (IUCN 3.1)

Scientific classification
- Kingdom: Animalia
- Phylum: Chordata
- Class: Mammalia
- Order: Primates
- Suborder: Strepsirrhini
- Family: Galagidae
- Genus: Sciurocheirus
- Species: S. alleni
- Subspecies: S. a. cameronensis

Trinomial name
- Sciurocheirus alleni cameronensis (Peters, 1876)
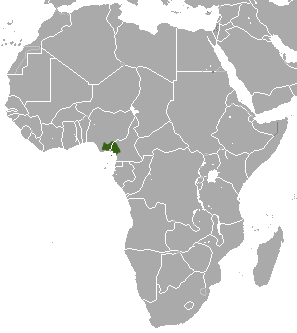
- Map showing range of Cross River bushbaby on the mainland and Allen's bushbaby on Bioko

Subspecies of primate

The Cross River bushbaby, also known as the Cross River squirrel galago, (Sciurocheirus alleni cameronensis) is a subspecies of prosimian primate in the family Galagidae which is endemic to a restricted area of West Africa. It is one of four species of squirrel galago in the genus Sciurocheirus.

== Description ==
The Cross River bushbaby is a medium-sized bushbaby with little noticeable sexual dimorphism, except that the males may be slightly larger than the females. They have a prominent snout with a pale grey stripe on the nose which broadens out on to the forehead. The fur on the animal's underparts is whitish or grey and this extends onto the inside of the legs and the cheeks. It has black rings surrounding the large, round, chocolate brown eyes which meet between the eyes to form a face mask. It has naked ears, which are black in colour with some times have a pale grey ring at their base. The dorsal fur is generally brown grizzled with grey except that the shoulders, flanks and outer forelimbs are rufous. It has greyish black palms on the hands and soles on the feet. The long tail, which is a fifth longer than the body, is bushy along its length and is coloured dark grey to black, and sometimes has a white tip. Individual variation occurs in the extent of rufous on the anterior dorsal fur, tail colour and the face mask. The weight varies from 220 to 355 grams (7.8 to 12.5 oz).

== Distribution ==
The Cross River bushbaby is endemic to a restricted area in West Africa from the Niger River through South-eastern Nigeria to the Sanaga River in central Cameroon. It is recorded from the Cross River National Park in Nigeria, as well as from Ebo Wildlife Reserve, Korup National Park and Banyang-Mbo Wildlife Sanctuary in Cameroon.

== Habitat ==
The Cross River bush baby occurs on high rainfall, primary tropical rainforest, both lowland and montane, up to an altitude of 2000m. It occurs in well developed secondary forest with an understorey which is relatively open and will use plantations for foraging in.

== Habits ==
The Cross River bushbaby is a nocturnal, arboreal animal but it will occasionally forage on the ground, where it hunts for fallen fruit and invertebrates. They are agile leapers and jump from tree to tree, preferring to use vertical limbs or trunks as supports. It usually forages quite close to the ground, normally within 5m, but has been seen up to 15m from the ground. It often sits in the trees above swarming ants to catch the invertebrates escaping the swarm. During the day it roosts in tangles of lianas and young may be left in these while the mother is foraging. They are territorial with both sexes holding territories with home ranges of just under 3ha.

They are normally solitary but 2-3 individuals may associate and move around together, 2-7 female territories may lie within or overlap with a single male's territory. Some adult females may share sleeping sites and these are more likely to associate with each other while foraging. Young females remain in their mother's territory until they are sexually mature. Mating may last up to an hour and is preceded by the marking of the substrate with urine by both sexes. The females carry the normally single young in their mouths for 45 days. Breeding occurs throughout the year.
