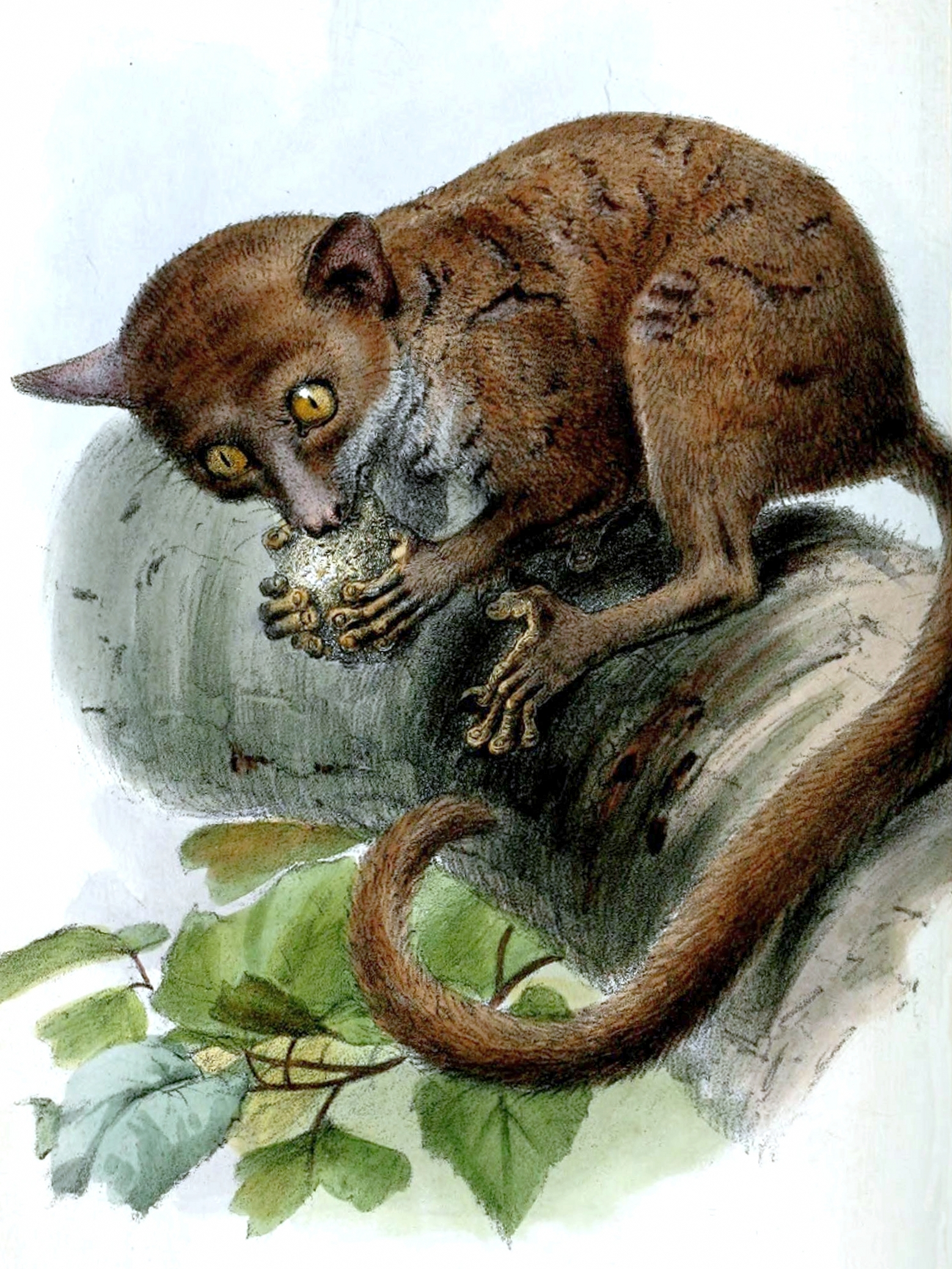
- Prince Demidoff's bushbaby (Gs. demidovii)

Scientific classification
- Kingdom: Animalia
- Phylum: Chordata
- Class: Mammalia
- Order: Primates
- Suborder: Strepsirrhini
- Family: Galagidae
- Genus: Galagoides; A. Smith, 1833

Type species
- Galagoides demidoffii (G. Fischer, 1806)

Species
- Galagoides demidovii Galagoides kumbirensis Galagoides thomasi

= Western dwarf galago =

Galagoides

Species of primate

The western dwarf galagos are a group of three species of strepsirrhine primates, native to western and central Africa. They are classified in the genus Galagoides of the family Galagidae. The eastern dwarf galagos (P. cocos, P. granti, P. orinus, P. rondoensis, and P. zanzibaricus) have been moved to their own genus, Paragalago, based on genetic evidence and differences in vocalization. The two genera are not sister taxa and thus may have evolved their small sizes via parallel evolution. They are separated by the East African Rift.

The first genus to be introduced to scientific literature was Galago by Geoffroy Saint-Hilaire. The genus was based on a smaller species from West Africa. Later, the genus Galagoides was introduced by Sir Andrew Smith in 1833. Smith wanted to differentiate the dwarf (Gd. demidovii) and the lesser galagos from the 'true galagos.' Otolemur was later introduced to indicate the greater galagos by Coquerel in 1859. Before the 21st century, three new dwarf galagos were recognized as species.

The day-sleeping nests may be shared by groups of females or occasionally by visiting males.

== Galagoides species ==
Genus Galagoides – A. Smith, 1833 – three species
| Common name | Scientific name and subspecies | Range | Size and ecology | IUCN status and estimated population |
|---|---|---|---|---|
| Angolan dwarf galago | G. kumbirensis Svensson et al., 2017 | Angola in southwestern Africa | Size: 14–18 cm (6–7 in) long, plus 17–21 cm (7–8 in) tail Habitat: Forest and shrubland Diet: Unknown | NT Unknown |
| Prince Demidoff's bushbaby | G. demidovii (Fischer von Waldheim, 1806) | Western and central equatorial Africa | Size: 10–13 cm (4–5 in) long, plus 15–21 cm (6–8 in) tail Habitat: Forest Diet: Insects, as well as fruit and gum | LC Unknown |
| Thomas's bushbaby | G. thomasi (Elliot, 1907) | Western and central equatorial Africa | Size: 12–17 cm (5–7 in) long, plus 15–24 cm (6–9 in) tail Habitat: Forest Diet: Insects, as well as small vertebrates, fruit, and tree buds, leaves, and gum | LC Unknown |
