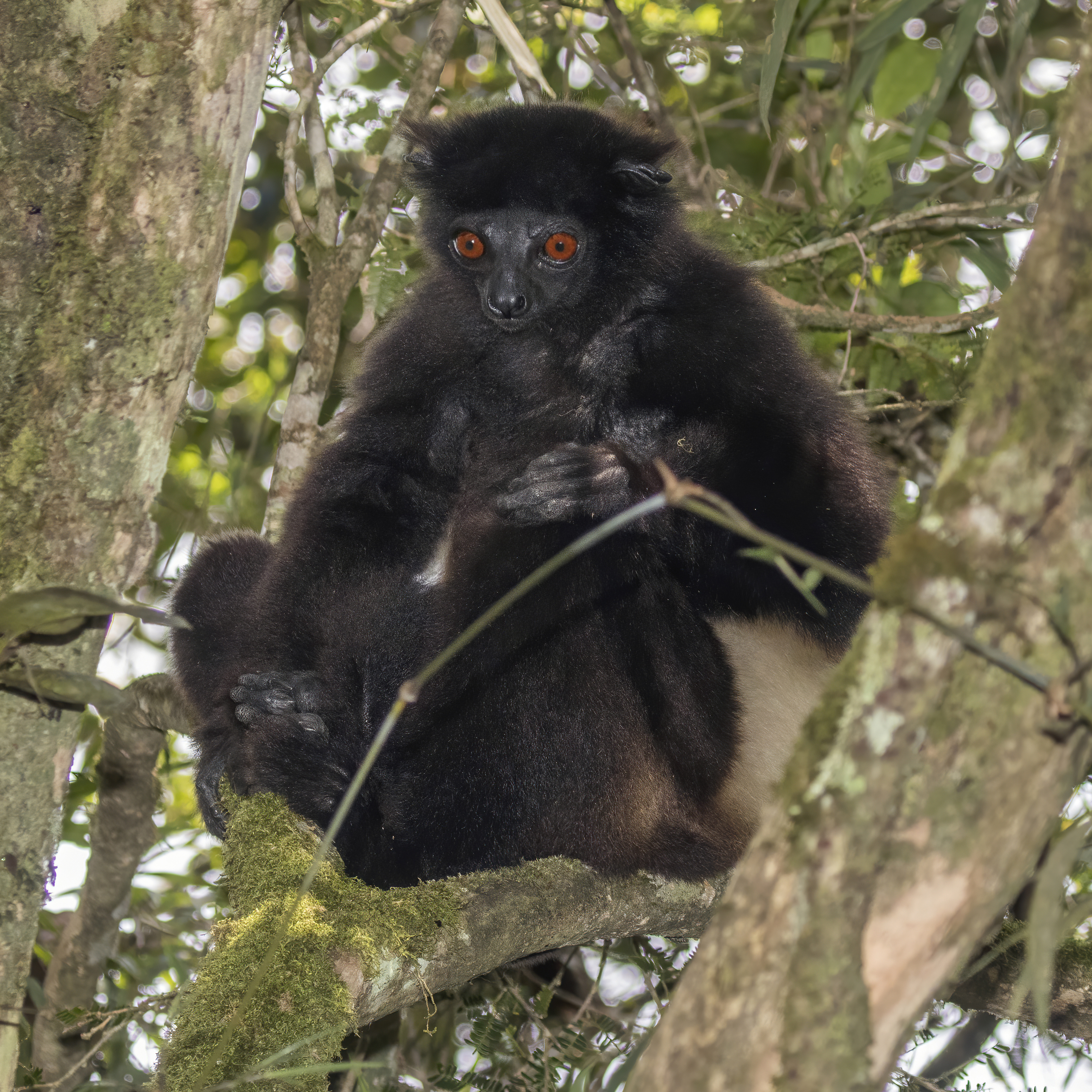
- In Ranomafana National Park

Conservation status
- Endangered (IUCN 3.1)
- CITES Appendix I

Scientific classification
- Kingdom: Animalia
- Phylum: Chordata
- Class: Mammalia
- Order: Primates
- Suborder: Strepsirrhini
- Family: Indriidae
- Genus: Propithecus
- Species: P. edwardsi

Binomial name
- Propithecus edwardsi A. Grandidier, 1871
- Distribution of P. edwardsi

Synonyms
- bicolor Gray, 1872; holomelas Günther, 1875

= Milne-Edwards's sifaka =

Species of lemur

Milne-Edwards's sifaka (Propithecus edwardsi), or Milne-Edwards's simpona, is a large arboreal, diurnal lemur endemic to the eastern coastal rainforest of Madagascar. Milne-Edwards's sifaka is characterized by a black body with a light-colored "saddle" on the lower part of its back. It is closely related to the diademed sifaka, and was until recently considered a subspecies of it. Like all sifakas, it is a primate in the family Indriidae.

The species' name honors French zoologist Henri Milne-Edwards (1800–1885).

== Conservation status ==
Milne-Edwards's sifaka is categorized as endangered by the IUCN, and is listed in CITES Appendix I. As of 2008, there were estimated to be approximately 28,600 individuals left with only about 3,500 of those remaining in protected areas. It remains threatened by habitat loss, hunting and may be sensitive to a changing climate.

== Anatomy and physiology ==
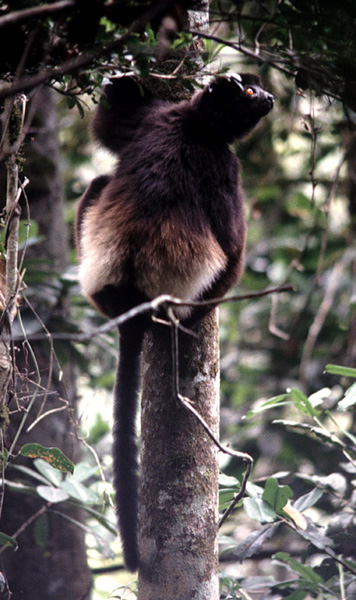
In Ranomafana National Park

Milne-Edwards's sifaka is the second largest species in Propithecus, and one of the larger diurnal lemur species overall. The average weight of a male Milne-Edwards's sifaka is 5.90 kg (13.0 lb) and for females it is 6.30 kg (13.9 lb). The body length excluding the tail is 47.6 cm (18.7 in) for males and females measure 47.7 cm (18.8 in). The tail is slightly shorter than the body, averaging 455 mm (17.9 in) in length or about 94% of the total head and body length.

The Milne-Edwards's sifaka has a typical Propithecus body shape with orange-red eyes and a short, black, bare face ringed by a puffy spray of dark brown to black fur. The majority of its coat is dark brown or black long silky fur, but on the center of the sifaka's back and flanks is a brown to cream colored saddle shaped area which is divided in half by a line of dark fur along the spine. The shape and coloration of the saddle patch vary by individual. The Milne-Edwards' sifaka exhibit neither sexual dimorphism nor sexual dichromatism.

As with all lemurs, the Milne-Edwards's sifaka has special adaptations for grooming, including a toilet-claw on its second toe, and a toothcomb.

The hands and feet of the lemur have prehensile "thumbs" and big toes, which allow it to maintain a superb grip on trunks and branches. The pads of its fingers and toes are rough and have a large contact area. Its nails are also sharp and pointed, which allows them to dig in if it slips. The big toe of the Milne-Edwards's sifaka and indrids in general is longer and has a deeper cleft compared to that of lemurids. This is thought to reflect stronger grasping abilities.

=== Locomotion ===
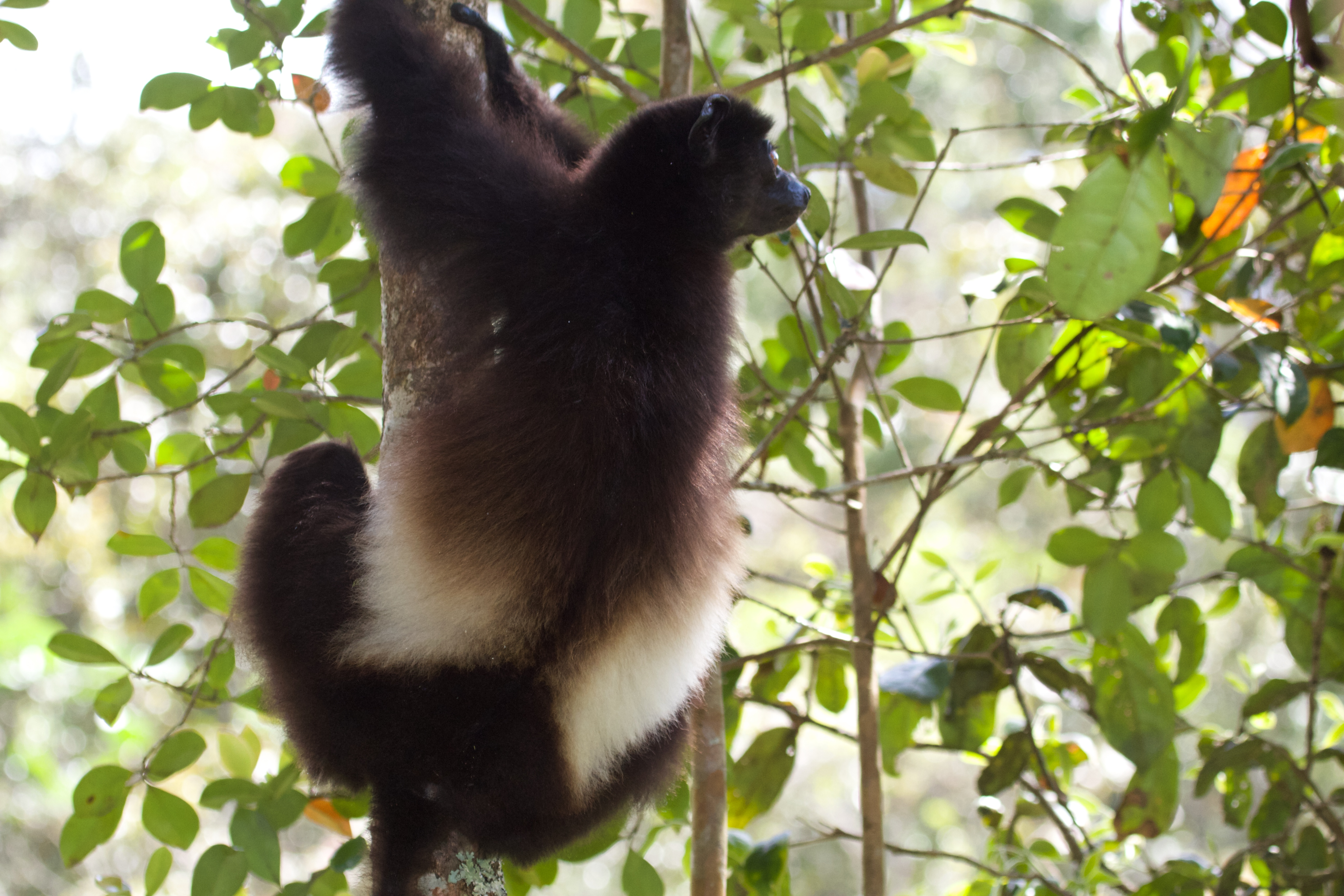
Dorsal view

The arboreal lifestyle of P. edwardsi demands high coordination, a well-developed grip, and considerable acrobatics. This lemur moves by vertical clinging and leaping, meaning it maintains an upright position leaping from tree trunk to tree trunk and moving along branches. It leaping between trees, the Milne-Edwards's sifaka performs a 180 degree twist in midair so that it is facing the incoming landing target. Primarily movements of the arms but also those of the tail are used to adjust the body's rotation and stability on the fly. When landing, the Milne-Edwards's sifaka swings its tail and outstretched forearms downward to help keep the body forward much like a long-jumper. It hands hind legs first. The tail and one arm is flung forward turing takeoff.

Milne-Edwards's sifakas can probably leap between 8 and 10 m (26 and 33 ft). The lemur rarely descends from the relative safety of the canopy, so spends little time on the ground. P. edwardsi will solely use trees to traverse its habitat, however if forced to cross open area like roads it will use a bipedal sideways hop.

The Milne-Edwards's sifaka can hang from its hind legs upside-down.

The sifaka practices climbing and leaping in its infancy when it ventures from its mother's back. It is not uncommon for infant lemurs to fall, whereupon the mother quickly comes to the infant's assistance. Adult lemurs typically do not fall although they may occasionally lose their grip if the bark of the tree shears off from beneath their fingers. Lemurs may carry food while they travel in their hands, though they prefer to place the objects in their mouth.

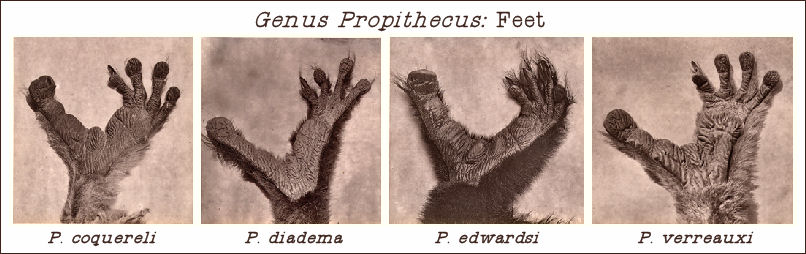

== Ecology ==
=== Geographic range and habitat ===
Milne-Edwards's sifaka is endemic to the island of Madagascar off the southeastern coast of Africa. Milne-Edwards's sifaka is found in primary and secondary rainforests on the southeastern part of the island at elevations between 600 and 1,600 m (2,000 and 5,200 ft). Milne-Edwards' sifaka has the southernmost range of the diademed sifakas. The Mangoro and Onive rivers border the northern part of its range and its southern range extends to Andringitra National Park and the Rienana River.

=== Sympatric relations ===
The following lemur species can be found within the same geographic range as the Milne-Edwards's sifaka:

- Eastern woolly lemur (Avahi laniger)
- Greater dwarf lemur (Cheirogaleus major)
- Aye-aye (Daubentonia madagascariensis)
- Common brown lemur (Eulemur fulvus)
- Red-bellied lemur (Eulemur rubriventer)
- Golden bamboo lemur (Hapalemur aureus)
- Eastern lesser bamboo lemur (Hapalemur griseus)
- Small-toothed sportive lemur (Lepilemur microdon)
- Brown mouse lemur (Microcebus rufus)
- Greater bamboo lemur (Prolemur simus)
- Black-and-white ruffed lemur (Varecia variegata)

== Behavior ==
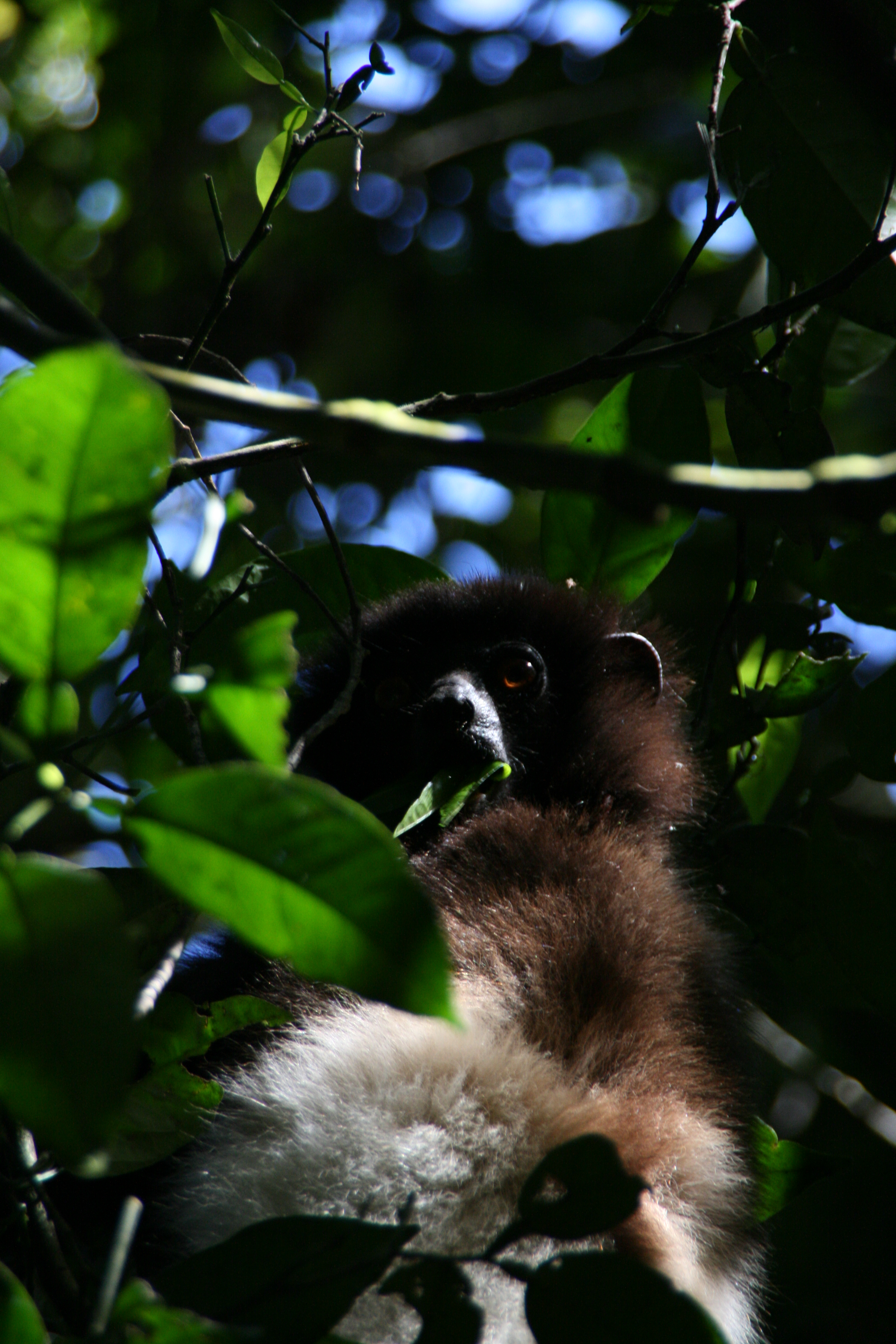
Nestling in foliage

The behavior and social organization of P. edwardsi is particularly well studied. The Milne-Edwards's sifaka is arboreal, diurnal, territorial, and group-forming. Females are dominant over males, typical of lemurs but extremely rare in all other primates.

=== Diet ===
The Milne-Edwards's sifaka's diet is composed primarily of both mature and immature leaves and seeds, but they also regularly consume flowers and fruit. They also supplement their diet with soil and subterranean fungus. In the process of foraging, the Milne-Edwards' sifakas range an average of 670 m (2,200 ft) per day.

=== Social organization ===
Milne-Edwards's sifakas form multi-male/multi-female, multi-age groups of between three and nine individuals with a mean group size of 4.8. Depending on the number and gender of individuals, the group may be polygynandrous, polyandrous, polygynous, or monogamous. Shifts in the number of individuals or the ratio of males and females will affect the social structure. The groups provide protection from predators, while the size is limited by inter-group competition for seasonal feeding resources. Group dynamics are probably dictated by balancing the benefits and costs of predation protection, inter-group competition for food resources, and mating opportunities. About half of Milne-Edwards's sifakas of the individuals of both sexes born in a particular group will emigrate; females leave as juveniles, while males can leave as both juveniles and adults.

=== Reproduction ===
Milne-Edwards's sifakas become sexually mature at 2 or 3 years or age. Milne-Edwards's sifakas have one mating season annually during the austral summer in the months of December and January. Females give birth during the austral winter months of May and July after a 179-day gestation.

== Research ==
Most of the research on Propithecus edwardsi is conducted at Ranomafana National Park in Madagascar. Most of the lemurs are collared and the lead females carry a tracking device. Currently there are no captive lemurs of this species.
