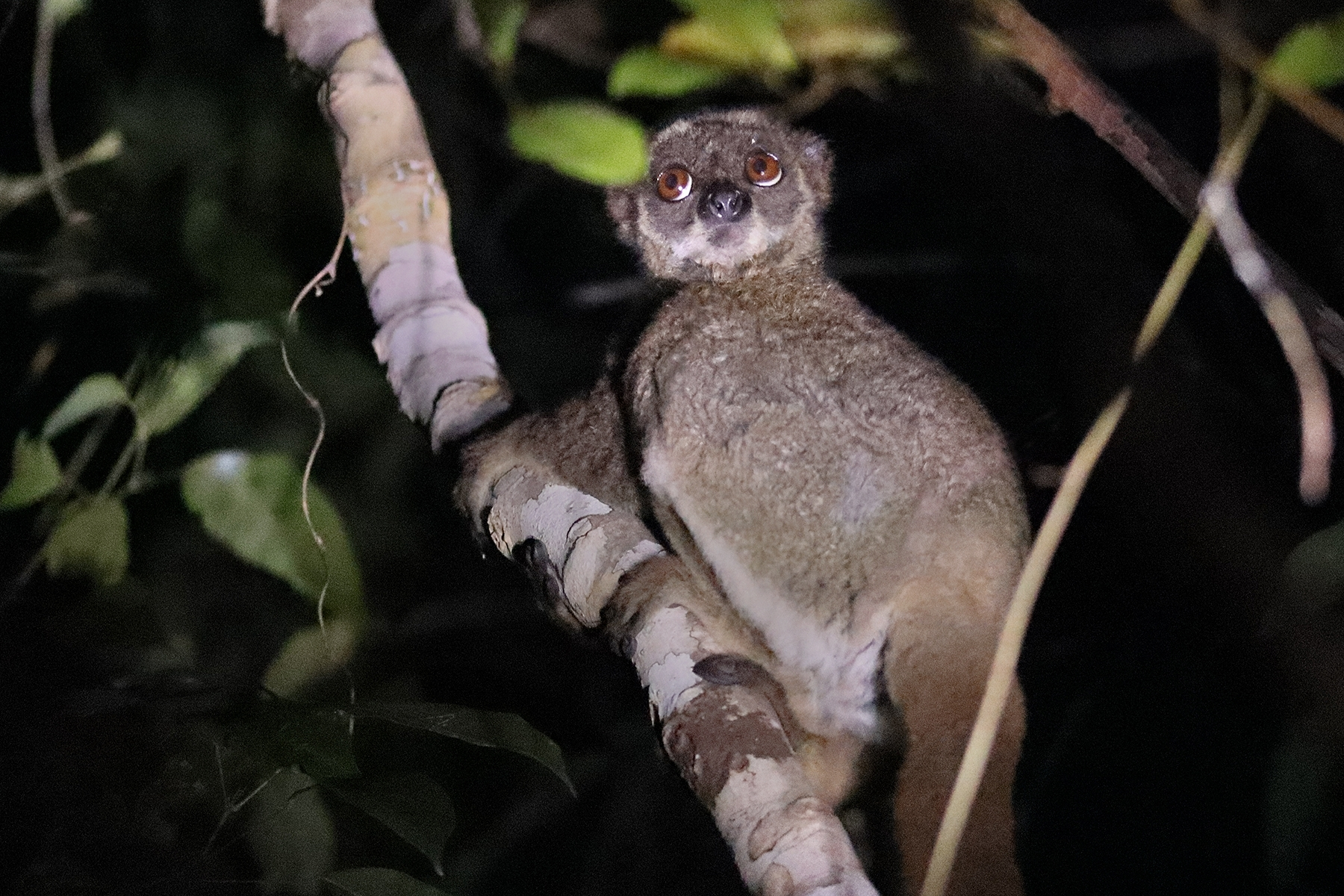

Conservation status
- Critically Endangered (IUCN 3.1)
- CITES Appendix I

Scientific classification
- Kingdom: Animalia
- Phylum: Chordata
- Class: Mammalia
- Order: Primates
- Suborder: Strepsirrhini
- Family: Indriidae
- Genus: Avahi
- Species: A. cleesei

Binomial name
- Avahi cleesei Thalmann & Geissmann, 2005
- Distribution of A. cleesei

= Bemaraha woolly lemur =

Species of lemur

The Bemaraha woolly lemur (Avahi cleesei), also known as Cleese's woolly lemur, is a species of woolly lemur native to western Madagascar, named after John Cleese. The first scientist to discover the species named it after Cleese, star of Monty Python, mainly because of Cleese's fondness for lemurs, as shown in Operation Lemur with John Cleese and Fierce Creatures, and his efforts at protecting and preserving them. The species was first recorded in 1990 by a team of scientists from Zurich University led by Urs Thalmann, but was not formally described as a species until 11 November 2005.

The diurnal animal weighs about 5–6 kilograms (11–13 lb), has brown skin with white regions on the rear and inside of the thighs and has a short damp nose, large plate eyes, and ears which hardly stand out from the skin. It typically has a strictly vegetarian diet of leaves and buds, living together in small families. The local population calls the species dadintsifaky, which means "grandfather of the sifaka", because it is similarly sized to sifakas, but more ponderous, heavyset and has ample greyish-brown fur.

The habitat is limited to the Tsingy de Bemaraha Strict Nature Reserve in western Madagascar, which is a UNESCO World Heritage Site. The animal is probably threatened with becoming extinct in the long run, since the size of the population is unknown so far and its habitat shrinks continuously.

== Description ==
Its face is slightly more pale than its upper head, and the area above the nose extends to the forehead to contrast with the triangular pattern created by the forehead fur. The fur that borders the face is a black tone and forms a dark pattern in the shape of a line or stripe that resembles the letter "V". Its eyes are a maroon color with black eyelids, and the snout is black and hairless, while the corners of the mouth have a white tone.

The fur on the head and body is a brown-gray color and has a slightly curled or freckled appearance. Its tail is beige or brownish-gray in color, and slightly red on the dorsal side of the base. The surface color of the lower limbs of the species is white, while the chest, belly, and inner area of the upper limbs is a light gray color with relatively thin fur.

== Distribution ==
The Bemaraha woolly lemur is found between 27 and 82 meters (89 and 269 ft) above sea level in western Madagascar, in Tsingy de Bemaraha National Park to the north of the Manambolo River. Within the National Park, it has been recorded in Ankindrodro Forest and in a forest 3–4 kilometers (1.9–2.5 mi) east-northeast from the village of Ambalarano at the base of the western Tsingy precipice. It formerly occurred in a forest near the village of Ankinajao that was destroyed in the 2000s. The northern extent of its range is unclear. The extent of occurrence is less than 500 km^{2} (190 sq mi). The type locality is about 3 km (1.9 mi) northeast of the village of Ambalarano.
