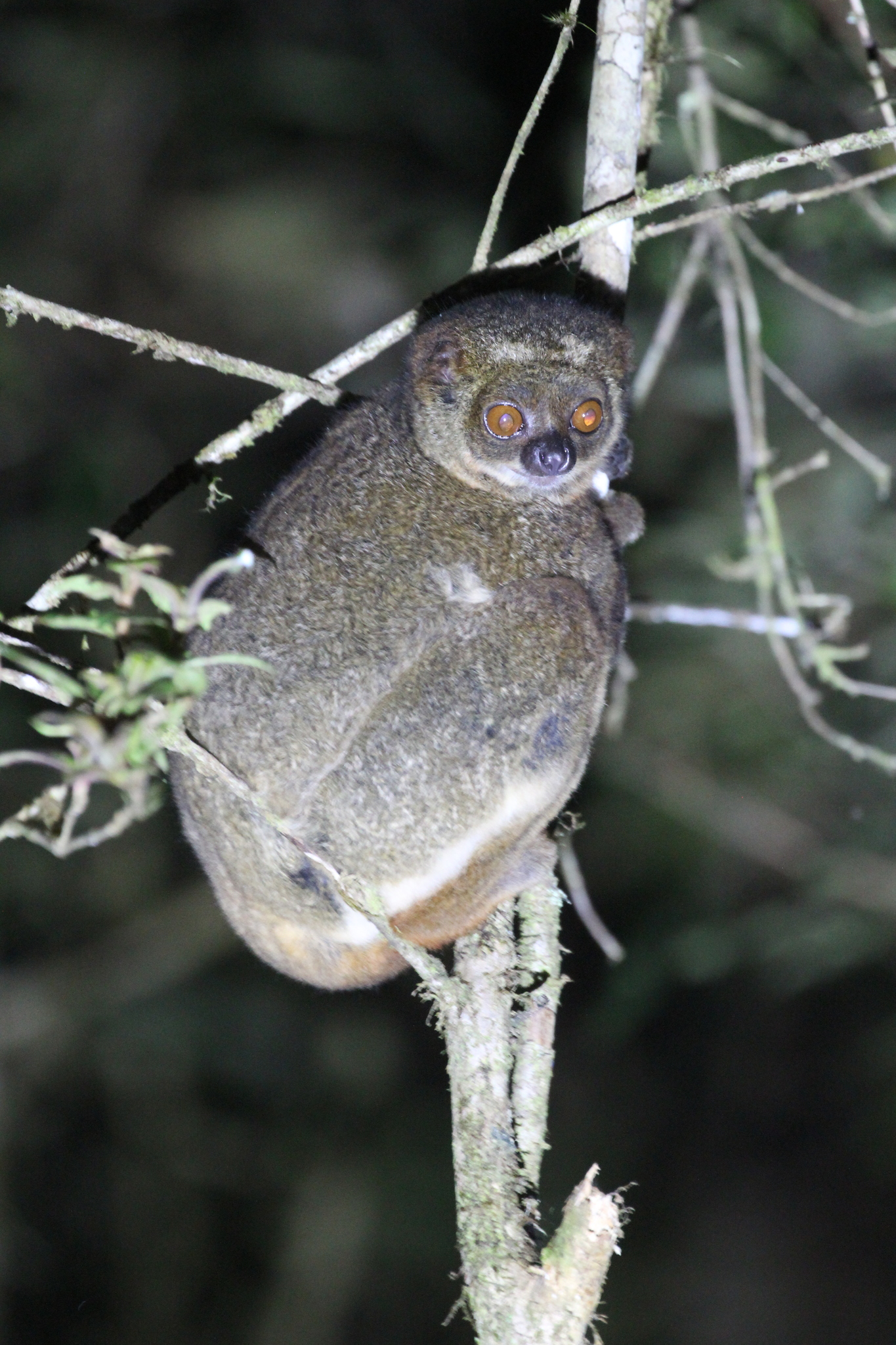
- Eastern woolly lemur (A. laniger)

Scientific classification
- Kingdom: Animalia
- Phylum: Chordata
- Class: Mammalia
- Order: Primates
- Suborder: Strepsirrhini
- Family: Indriidae
- Genus: Avahi; Jourdan, 1834

Type species
- Lemur laniger Gmelin, 1788

Diversity
- About 9 species
- Combined distribution of Avahi

Synonyms
- Microrhynchus Jourdan, 1834; Semnocebus Lesson, 1840; Iropocus Gloger, 1841; Habrocebus Wagner, 1839

= Woolly lemur =

Woolly lemurs (Avahi)

Genus of lemurs

The woolly lemurs, also known as avahis or woolly indris, are nine species of strepsirrhine primates belonging to the genus Avahi. These lemurs are endemic to Madagascar, where they inhabit the eastern rainforests and the western dry deciduous forests of the island. Woolly lemurs are the smallest indriids, with head-body lengths of 23 to 33 cm (9.1 to 13.0 in), tail lengths of 26.5 to 40 cm (10.4 to 15.7 in), and body weights that are 1 kg (2.2 lb) on average. The pelage is short and flocky. The body can be gray-brown to reddish, and is accompanied by a long, rufous tail. A white stripe is present on the dorsal aspect of the thigh in all species. The head is round with a short muzzle, and the ears are hidden by the fur. The generic name Avahi is derived from an eastern Malagasy name for woolly lemurs, and there are many other local names for the genus across Madagascar. Though they were once considered to comprise a single species, woolly lemurs have a complex taxonomic history, with most members of the genus having been described in the 2000s.

Woolly lemurs are typically the only primates that are simultaneously nocturnal, folivorous, and monogamous, although some populations of the southern woolly lemur (Avahi meridionalis) are cathemeral. Woolly lemurs can be found in both humid and dry forests, where they spend their lives traveling between tree crowns using their vertical clinging and leaping method of locomotion. They are strictly herbivorous, with their diets being primarily composed of young leaves. As nocturnal folivores, they take long naps throughout the night and sleep through the day to digest their fibrous diet. Woolly lemurs live in groups of two to five individuals, which typically consist of a bonded breeding pair and their offspring. Groups sleep together during the day in tree forks, vine tangles, and dense tree crowns. Both sexes participate in the defense of their territories, with conflicts involving aggressive chasing and vocalizations. Although females are dominant over males, woolly lemurs exhibit low rates of agonism between pair-bonded partners.

All nine woolly lemur species are classified as threatened by the International Union for Conservation of Nature, with the Sambirano woolly lemur (A. unicolor) and Bemaraha woolly lemur (A. cleesei) being classified as critically endangered. Threats include widespread poaching and deforestation resulting in habitat loss and fragmentation. Poaching of woolly lemurs is often motivated by food insecurities among rural Malagasy communities due to a lack of livestock as alternative meat sources, while deforestation is usually caused by bush fires created for slash and burn agriculture. These dangers are present both within and outside of protected areas.

== Etymology ==
In Malagasy, woolly lemurs are known as fotsifé, which means "white leg," in reference to the white patch of fur on the dorsal surface of the thigh in all species. In eastern Madagascar, woolly lemurs are known as avahy, which is an onomatopoeia derived from one of their vocalizations. In the east, they are also known by the Sabaki-derived name ampongy, which could be related to k^{h}ima punju, a Swahili name for the Zanzibar red colobus (Colobus kirkii) on Unguja, or ndege, a generic name for birds. An alternative explanation for the name ampongy relates it to the Nyakyusa word for the kipunji (Rungwecebus kipunji). In western Madagascar, the western woolly lemur (Avahi occidentalis) is known as the tsarafangitra, which may be related to the Malagasy word for a curved mark or sign, fangitra. The Bemaraha woolly lemur is called dadintsifaky, which means "grandfather of sifakas," on account of its resemblance to lemurs of the genus Propithecus.

== Evolutionary history ==
The Indriidae and Lemuridae families diverged from the Cheirogaleidae and Lepilemuridae families together about 43 million years ago, and were separated from each other shortly thereafter. The ancestral lineage of Avahi split from the ancestor of Propithecus and Indri about 29 million years ago. Woolly lemurs are basal indriids, as their karyotypes closely resemble the most recent common ancestor of Indriidae, compared to extant sifakas and the indri (Indri indri). The last common ancestor of all lemurs was hypothesized by Yves Rumpler et al. to have a somatic number of 2n = 66. Extant western woolly lemurs have a somatic number of 2n = 70, wherein all but two autosomal chromosomes are acrocentric. The X chromosome is submetacentric, and the Y chromosome is acrocentric. The eastern woolly lemur differs from the western woolly lemur insofar as it underwent a Robertsonian translocation between der(14) and an ancestral lemuroid microchromosome resulting in chromosome 2, and a pericentric chromosomal inversion of the ancestral lemuroid chromosome 1, from which arose the eastern woolly lemur's chromosome 1.

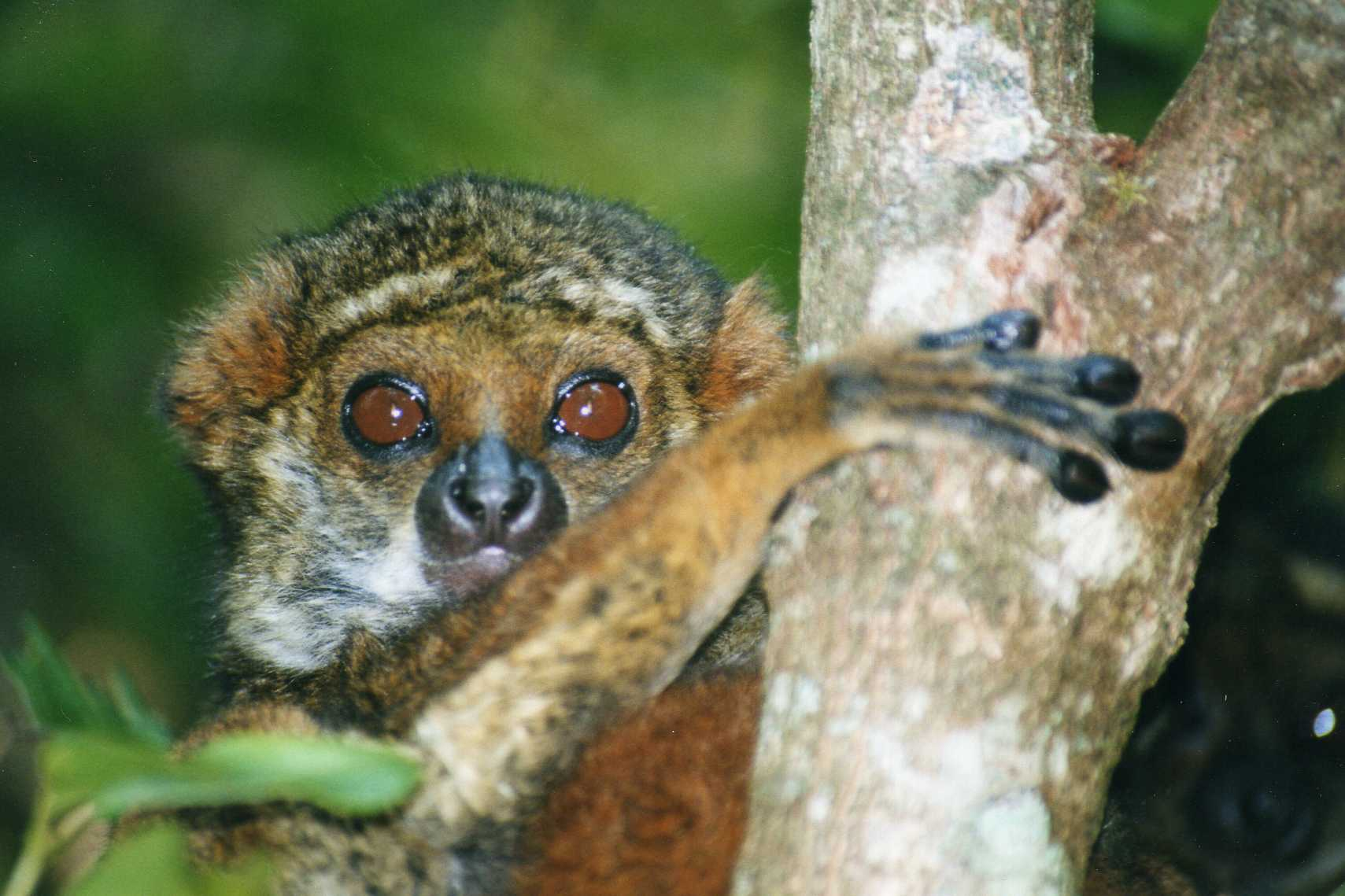
Molecular data indicate that there is significant genetic variation among Peyrieras's woolly lemurs.

Genetic variation exists within Peyrieras's woolly lemur (A. peyrierasi) such that Rambinintsoa Andriantompohavana et al. identified two "types" of the species. Runhua Lei et al. later found there to be three types that lived in sympatry in forest fragments near Ranomafana National Park. Lei et al. assigned two of the types to a species complex that is shared with the Betsileo woolly lemur (A. betsileo), with a third type potentially being a different species, although they suggested that larger data sets across different generations should be acquired before any conclusions could be drawn about the types' taxonomic relationships.

Further genetic variation within the genus was identified by Rumpler in a population of eastern woolly lemurs in the Maromizaha Forest with a heterozygotic karyotype featuring an additional Robertsonian translocation. He speculated that this was the result of hybridization with an as of yet undescribed subspecies of A. laniger, or that the species exhibits intraspecific chromosomal polymorphism. No species or subspecies other than the eastern woolly lemur have since been described in the Maromizaha Forest.

=== Taxonomic classification ===
Nine species are currently recognized. The genus is divided into two clades that correspond with the western and eastern distributions of the taxa.

- Family Indriidae
  - Genus Indri: indris
  - Genus Propithecus: sifakas
  - Genus Avahi: woolly lemurs
    - East coast subgroup
      - Eastern woolly lemur, Avahi laniger
      - Peyrieras's woolly lemur, Avahi peyrierasi
      - Southern woolly lemur, Avahi meridionalis
      - Ramanantsoavana's woolly lemur, Avahi ramanantsoavanai
      - Betsileo woolly lemur, Avahi betsileo
      - Moore's woolly lemur, Avahi mooreorum
    - West coast subgroup
      - Western woolly lemur, Avahi occidentalis
      - Sambirano woolly lemur, Avahi unicolor
      - Bemaraha woolly lemur, Avahi cleesei

=== Changes in taxonomy ===
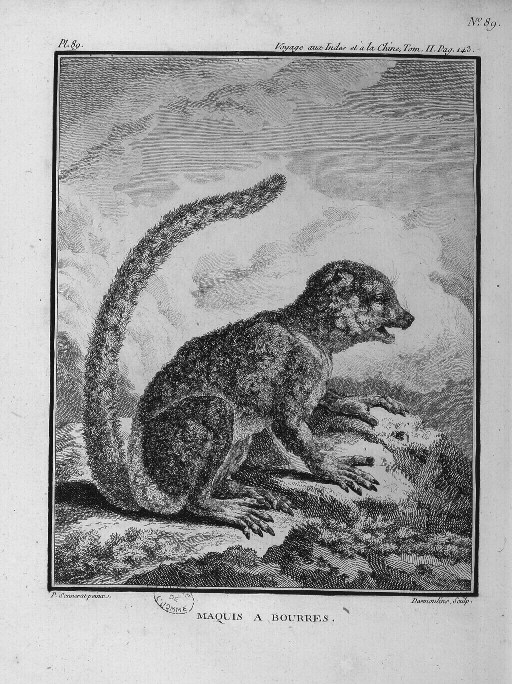
Pierre Sonnerat's maquis à bourres was the holotype of several synonymous descriptions.

The earliest verifiable account of a woolly lemur specimen was published in 1782 by Pierre Sonnerat in his memoir, Voyage aux Indes Orientales et a la Chine, wherein he details an eastern woolly lemur specimen that he acquired from the Antongil Bay area. He named the specimen le maquis à bourres, which was the only known woolly lemur specimen in Europe for almost 50 years. Sonnerat's specimen may not have been the first recording of the animal; Henri Milne-Edwards and Alfred Grandidier believed that a vari de Manghabey that was mentioned by Étienne de Flacourt in 1661 was also a woolly lemur. Sonnerat's maquis à bourres was not granted a binomial name until Johann Friedrich Gmelin published his 1788 description of the specimen as Lemur laniger in the posthumous 13th edition of Carl Linnaeus' Systema Naturae. Using Sonnerat's specimen, Johann Heinrich Friedrich Link then wrote of a Lemur brunneus in 1795, based on Gmelin's description. Étienne Geoffroy Saint-Hilaire removed the woolly lemur from the Lemur genus in 1796, and instead assigned it to Indri as Indri longicaudatus. Johann Karl Wilhelm Illiger subsequently described it as Lichanotus laniger in 1811, with Lichanotus being an alternative generic name to Indri and Lemur. Later authors, such as Jan van der Hoeven and Daniel Giraud Elliot, would mistakenly bestow priority on Lichanotus over Avahi on account of the former preceding the latter. This nomenclature was invalid, as Illiger's Lichanotus was coined to replace the generic name Indri, rather than to move the woolly lemur to a unique genus. The first author to validly describe the woolly lemur as a monotypic genus was Claude Jourdan in his 1834 description of Avahi. Jourdan's prior description of the animal, Microrhynchus, was invalidated on account of the name having already been used by Johann Carl Megerle in 1823. Jourdan used the skin and skull of Sonnerat's specimen as his holotype, and derived the generic name from the Malagasy term for the eastern woolly lemur: the onomatopoeic avahi or vahi, which imitate one of the animal's vocalizations. Subsequent generic names include Avahis I. Geoffroy Saint-Hilaire, 1835 as a correction of Jourdan's generic name, Habrocebus Wagner, 1839, Semnocebus Lesson, 1840, and Iropocus Gloger, 1841.

The first taxonomic acknowledgement of variation within Avahi was described by Ludwig Lorenz von Liburnau in 1898, when he distinguished an eastern Avahi laniger laniger subspecies from a novel western A. l. occidentalis subspecies. He based this new description on a western woolly lemur skull and skin collected near Betsako by Alfred Voeltzkow in 1892. Both of the holotypes for Lorenz's subspecies, one of which was Sonnerat's maquis à bourres, were later lost from their museum collections in Paris and Vienna, and had to be substituted with neotypes. Lorenz's taxonomy was used by scholars throughout most of the 20th century, and would not become obsolete until 1990, when Rumpler et al. proposed elevating both A. l. laniger and A. l. occidentalis to specific statuses after modeling an infertile hybrid between the two taxa. A third Avahi species, the Sambirano woolly lemur, was described on account of morphological evidence published in 2000 by Urs Thalmann and Thomas Geissmann. Thalmann and Geissmann described A. unicolor as constituting the northernmost of three discontinuous populations of western woolly lemurs, while also suggesting potential speciation between the central and southern populations. They revisited Avahi in 2005, when they described the southernmost population as the Bemaraha woolly lemur. The description was based on a released type individual from which the authors obtained hair samples, photographs, recorded vocalizations, and morphometric data. They named the species in honor of John Cleese for his contributions to lemur conservation.

It was not until after all three extant species of western woolly lemur were described that the eastern A. laniger taxon was revised. Using mitochondrial DNA to calculate genetic distance, Zaramody et al. described the southern woolly lemur and Peyrieras's woolly lemur in 2006, thereby relegating A. laniger to the northern half of its previously recognized range. At the time, they recognized two subspecies within A. meridionalis: A. m. meridionalis and Ramanantsoavana's woolly lemur (A. m. ramanantsoavanai), with the former constituting the majority of the species' range and the latter being confined to the Manombo Special Reserve and Agnalahaza Forest. The following year, Andriantompohavana et al. used mitochondrial DNA together with morphological and phenotypic data to conduct the first phylogenetic analysis of all then-recognized woolly lemur species. With these data, they recommended that A. m. meridionalis and A. m. ramanantsoavanai be elevated to specific statuses, as their genetic and morphological data exhibited greater disparities than those between other woolly lemur types that were already recognized as separate species. Additionally, they described a new eastern species, the Betsileo woolly lemur, based on blood samples, measurements, and photographs. The most recent woolly lemur species to be identified is Moore's woolly lemur (Avahi mooreorum), which was described in a 2008 revision of Avahi and Lepilemur species in Masoala National Park by Lei et al. They named the species after the Moore Family and the Gordon and Betty Moore Foundation for their support of conservation efforts around the world.

== Anatomy and physiology ==
Eastern woolly lemur skull

Woolly lemurs are the smallest living indriids. Head-body lengths range between 23 and 33 cm (9.1 and 13.0 in) and tail lengths range between 26.5 and 40 cm (10.4 and 15.7 in). Taken together, the average weight of woolly lemurs is 1 kg (2.2 lb), though this varies between species. The body mass of woolly lemurs is small relative to other folivores. Sexual dimorphism is minimal, though females are slightly larger than males, and a dark scent gland beneath the mandible is more pronounced in males. Woolly lemurs have long legs that facilitate their vertical clinging and leaping style of locomotion. The average intermembral index is 57, which is one of the lowest among primates. Woolly lemurs lack caudofemoralis muscles, which are almost ubiquitous across other primate taxa. The digital formula is 4>3>5>2>1, which, among lemurs, is unique to indriids and the aye-aye (Daubentonia madagascariensis). Most of the fingers are webbed up to the distal ends of the proximal phalanges, with the index finger being free. Woolly lemurs' heads have round appearances due to their large eyes, globular skulls, small ears, and flat muzzles. This roundness is further accentuated by a short, wide nasal bone that is rooted in a deep maxilla. The retina is almost entirely composed of rod cells, which is a trait that is associated with nocturnality.

The dentition of woolly lemurs has been the subject of controversy. Authors such as Charles Benjamin Bennejeant, Madeleine Friant, and Adolf Remane have constructed the permanent dental formula as 2.1.2.32.0.2.3 × 2 = 30, wherein the deciduous lower canines (dc_{−}) are not replaced, which results in the characteristic four-toothed toothcomb of indriids. Conversely, William Warwick James and Daris Swindler each constructed the dental formula as 2.1.2.31.1.2.3 × 2 = 30, which posits that it is two of the deciduous lower incisors (di_{2}) that are not replaced, and the permanent lower canines (C_{−}) adopt an incisiform shape in the toothcomb. Both models are in agreement that the deciduous dental formula is 2.1.22.1.2 × 2 = 20, and that the permanent dentition lacks a pair of premolars that are present in many other lemurs. The upper incisors (I^{1–2}) are peg-shaped, and the internal pair (I^{1}) are diastematic. There is no sexual dimorphism in canine size. The molars are bilophodont, and have prominent buccal cusps. The third molar (M^{3} and M_{3}) is much smaller than the first and second (M^{1–2} and M_{1–2}).

Woolly lemurs have large salivary glands. The stomach has a thick mucous membrane. The small intestine is over 14 times an individual's body length, and the cecum is so large that it is folded over itself five times. Woolly lemurs possess two large intestines. The first large intestine is a tight ovoid spiral called the tortillon, which consists of three loops. While the tortillon is also present in sifakas and the indri, it is smaller and less elaborate among woolly lemurs. Beyond the tortillon is a second, floating colon that terminates into the rectum. Woolly lemurs lack gallbladders and have rudimentary pancreases. Males have small testicles relative to the body sizes of non-monogamous lemurs, although they enlarge during annual mating seasons.

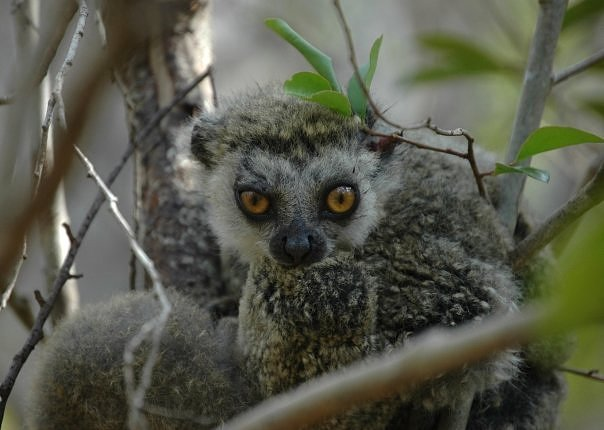
The mask of a western woolly lemur

The pelages of woolly lemurs vary between species, but generally consist of white, gray, red, and brown hues. Species can also be distinguished by facial markings known as "masks." Facial patterns are influenced by environmental factors such as climate and vegetation. Species living under dense forest cover tend to have darker forehead and periorbital coloration, while those living in areas with lower annual rainfall tend to have more complex facial patterns. Higher rainfall is associated with darker pigmentation around the eyes, on the forehead, and along the face margins. All woolly lemurs have a white patch on the dorsal side of the thigh, which is visible while they sit in the typical upright clinging posture. With the exception of the dorsal thigh patches, woolly lemurs exhibit countershading. Tails tend to be reddish relative to the rest of the pelage.

== Behavior ==
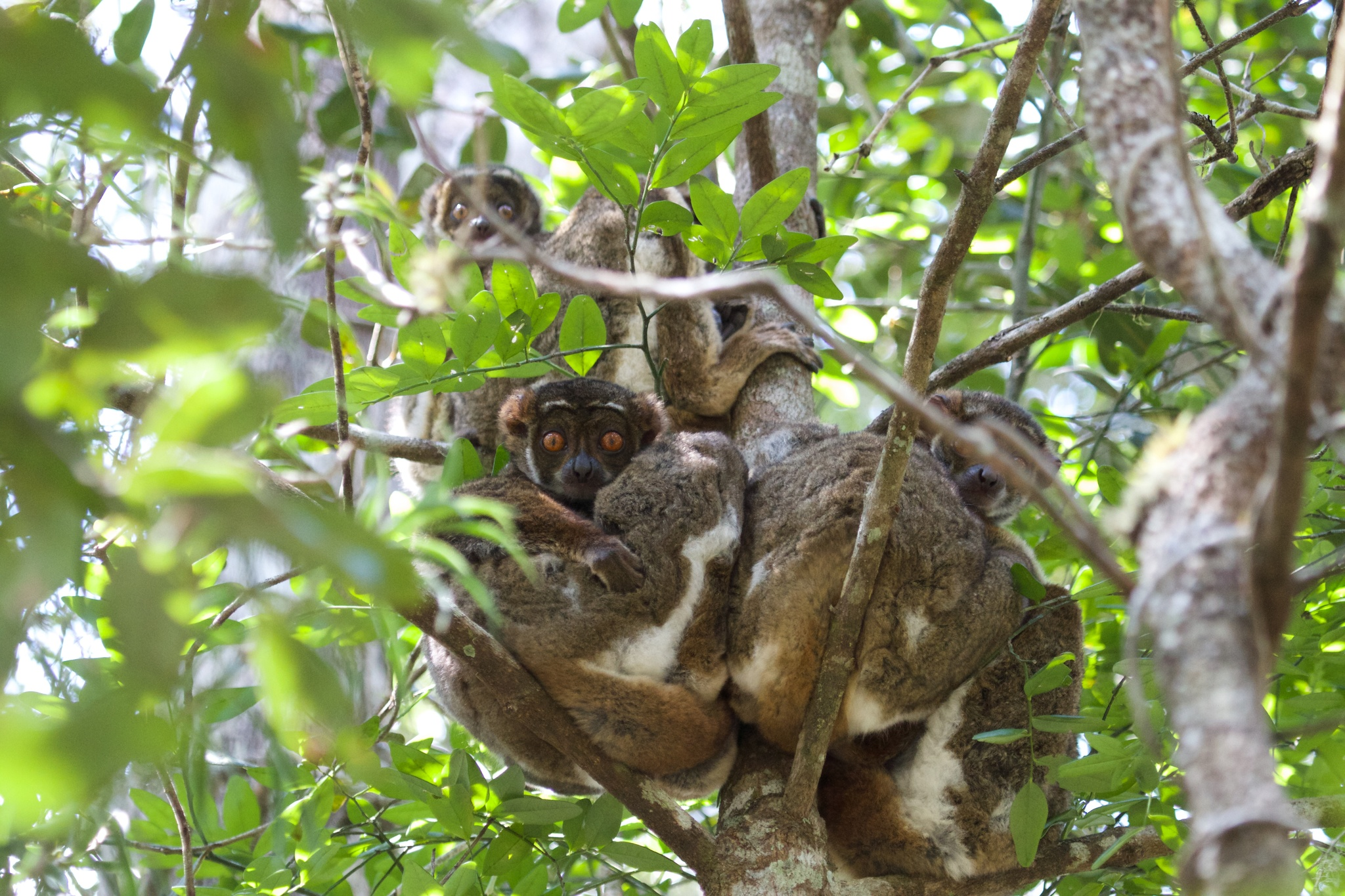
Eastern woolly lemurs sharing a sleeping site

Woolly lemurs' daily activities are prompted by ambient light levels. They are at their most active shortly after waking up during twilight, and they remain active throughout the rest of the night. After waking, individuals engage in autogrooming before leaving their sleeping sites, after which they undertake the longest bout of daily travel. A second period of high activity occurs around midnight, which is when foraging behaviors are most common. Woolly lemurs take frequent rests throughout a night; a 2004 study of unhabituated eastern woolly lemurs found that they spent 82% of their waking hours resting. During the daytime, woolly lemurs may continue their foraging activities after dawn, after which they will sleep until the evening. Some populations of southern woolly lemur are cathemeral. Woolly lemurs typically huddle together in tree crowns during the day, but will sometimes sleep in separate trees. They may move between trees during the day if they are exposed to too much sunlight.

=== Social structure ===
Woolly lemurs are monogamous, territorial primates that live in small family groups consisting of a breeding adult pair and their offspring. Woolly lemurs may need familiarity with their small home ranges to exploit food resources from a limited supply of trees, which may be the cause of their monogamous social structure. Thalmann proposed that pairs repeatedly exploit under-represented resources whose locations must be known and defended, and that females may prefer familiar mates who share this knowledge. He also discussed protection from infanticide and predation avoidance as possible correlates of monogamy. No direct paternal care has been observed in woolly lemurs. Both sexes participate in defending the borders of their territories from outgroup conspecifics, with intergroup conflicts consisting of chasing and reciprocal calling. A 2008 study of western woolly lemurs found that they exhibit the lowest rate of agonism between pair-living partners among all lemur species for which such data were available, however no studies have examined this pattern in other Avahi species as of 2022.

=== Diet ===
Woolly lemurs are folivores and young leaf specialists; a study of eastern woolly lemurs found that 98% of the surveyed individuals' diets were composed of young leaves. Young leaves are preferred over mature leaves, as mature leaves have fewer free sugars and a greater quantity of harmful compounds. Like other vertebrates, woolly lemurs are unable to digest cell walls of ingested food in their digestive tracts without the assistance of symbiotic microbes, many of which are housed in woolly lemurs' enlarged, sacculated ceca.

Woolly lemurs are unusual in that they are some of the smallest folivorous primates. Because leaves tend to be less nutritious than other food resources, most folivorous primates are large-bodied so as to efficiently ingest leaves in high volumes. Additionally, woolly lemurs are vertical clingers and leapers, which is an energetically expensive mode of travel that is usually practiced by specialist species that consume nutrient-rich foods such as gums, fruits, saps, or insects. As such, woolly lemurs are metabolically constrained by their small body sizes, low-quality leafy diets, and nutritionally demanding locomotor method. These challenges are overcome by being discriminatory with regard to leaf selection; western woolly lemurs closely inspect each leaf prior to consumption, possibly to discern nutritional quality. Woolly lemurs forage more frequently in the first half of a night than in the later hours. This behavior replenishes nutrients lost during sleep, and takes advantage of the high sugar contents of leaves that recently engaged in photosynthesis. Studies of western and eastern woolly lemurs indicate that they prefer a narrow range of food resources that provide easily extractable proteins, avoid alkaloids, and do not discriminate against condensed tannins. Tannin consumption slows down food passage rates in a woolly lemur's gut, which gives symbiotic microbes more time to digest cellulose. Southern woolly lemurs deviate from this pattern insofar as they consume alkaloids, and maintain a comparatively generalist diet by diluting toxins in their digestive tracts with a variety of plant species.

=== Circadian rhythm ===
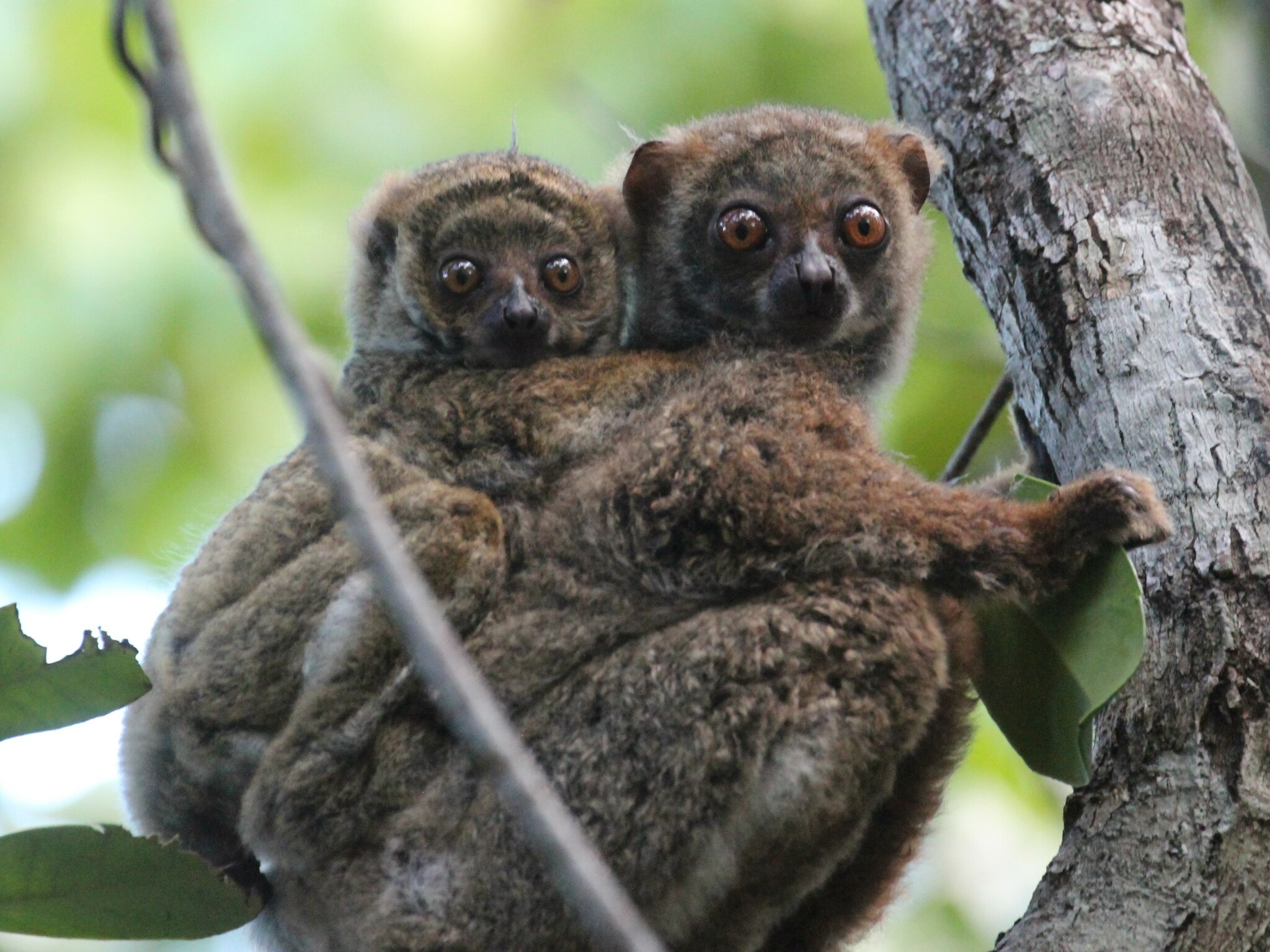
Southern woolly lemurs can be cathemeral.

Woolly lemurs are typically nocturnal, folivorous, and monogamous, with some southern woolly lemur populations exhibiting cathemerality. They are secondarily nocturnal, as they evolved from a diurnal indrisine ancestor. Unlike many nocturnal animals, they possess dichromatic vision. The rarity of nocturnal folivory among primates can be attributed to color vision being necessary to discern leaves that are rich in proteins, and because leaves contain fewer sugars during the night than in daytime. Several etiologies of this abnormal combination of behavioral traits have been proposed. Competition with extant, sympatric lemurs such as the indri is an unlikely explanation, as woolly lemur practice successful resource partitioning with other folivores. Nocturnal folivory in woolly lemurs may instead be a remnant of competition with extinct subfossil lemurs. Predation could also influence this combination of behaviors, as many other nocturnal lemurs are attacked by diurnal hawks in the same manner that woolly lemurs are.

Nocturnality is not ubiquitous across all Avahi populations; southern woolly lemurs in the Tsitongambarika protected area are cathemeral, as they engage in foraging and other locomotor activities throughout the daytime with such regularity as to not be attributable to sleep disturbances. It is possible that this behavioral pattern is a response to competition with sympatric lemur species such as Fleurette's sportive lemur (Lepilemur fleuretae), as cathemerality has not been recorded in southern woolly lemur populations that are not in sympatry with sportive lemurs. Alternatively, this could be a predation avoidance tactic, as woolly lemurs do not shelter in tree hollows, unlike other nocturnal strepsirrhines.

== Conservation status ==
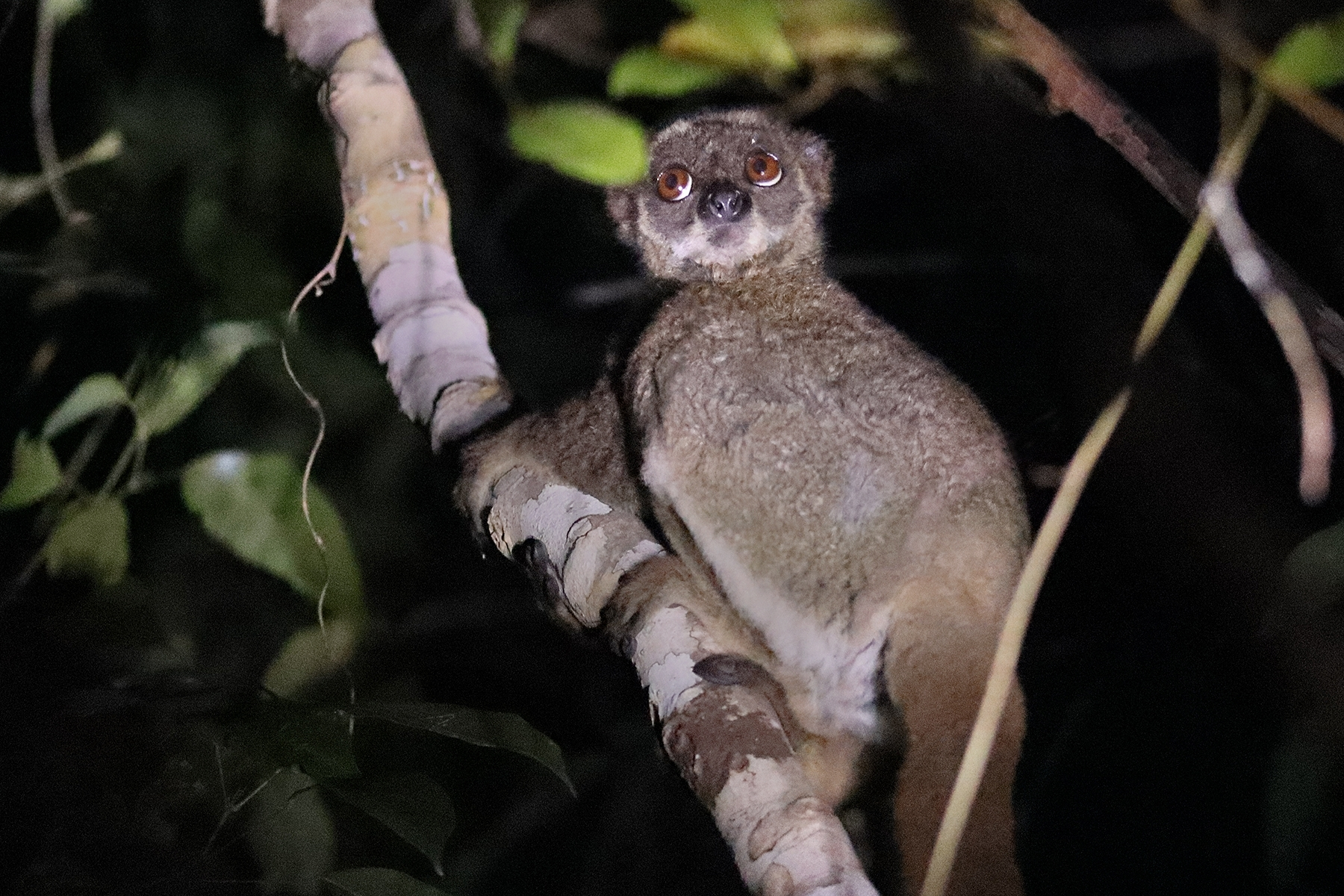
The Bemaraha woolly lemur is one of two critically endangered Avahi species.

All nine woolly lemur species are classified as threatened species by the International Union for Conservation of Nature, and the Sambirano woolly lemur and the Bemaraha woolly lemur are classified as critically endangered. Although woolly lemurs are found within protected areas, they are subjected to widespread poaching. Hunters most commonly use snares baited with fruit to trap eastern woolly lemurs. Alternatively, they may actively hunt them using slingshots, spears, and hunting dogs. Wealthy hunters, most of whom are residents of urban centers, sometimes hunt with guns instead. Many poachers target woolly lemurs for subsistence bushmeat, and are motivated by food insecurity and a lack of livestock in rural Malagasy communities. A 2016 survey of residents of the Tsitongambarika protected area found that 43.5% of respondents had previously consumed the meat of the southern woolly lemur. Woolly lemur hunting also results from the lack of alternative wild meat sources in Madagascar, such as large ungulates and rodents. Dry forest-dwelling woolly lemurs are especially threatened by hunting because their daytime sleeping sites are made conspicuous by yearly foliage reductions during the dry season.

Deforestation due to slash and burn agriculture is another major cause of woolly lemur species decline, as it results in habitat loss and fragmentation. Woolly lemurs are severely impacted by deforestation because they require trees to facilitate their vertical clinging and leaping locomotor method.

Avahi species are highly susceptible to COVID-19 infections through contact with humans. As of 2023, no woolly lemurs have been successfully kept in captivity.
