= Ramanantsoavana's woolly lemur =

Conservation status
- Vulnerable (IUCN 3.1)
- CITES Appendix I

Scientific classification
- Kingdom: Animalia
- Phylum: Chordata
- Class: Mammalia
- Order: Primates
- Suborder: Strepsirrhini
- Family: Indriidae
- Genus: Avahi
- Species: A. ramanantsoavanai

Binomial name
- Avahi ramanantsoavanai Zaramody et al., 2006
- Distribution of A. ramanantsoavanai

Species of lemur

Ramanantsoavana's woolly lemur (Avahi ramanantsoavanai), also known as Ramanantsoavana's avahi or the Manombo woolly lemur, is a species of woolly lemur native to southeastern Madagascar.

== Etymology ==
Ramanantsoavana's woolly lemur is named in honor of Georges Ramanantsoavana, the first Director of Water and Forestry of Madagascar, for his support of lemur conservation.

== Taxonomy ==
Ramanantsoavana's woolly lemur was originally considered a subspecies of the southern woolly lemur (A. meridionalis), as A. m. ramanantsoavana, but was elevated to a separate species in 2006 based on molecular, phenotypic and morphological data.

== Description ==
Ramanantsoavana's woolly lemur has a head-body length of 24–31 centimeters (9.4–12.2 in), a tail length of 33–40 cm (13–16 in), totaling to a full body length of 54.6–68.9 cm (21.5–27.1 in). The species exhibits sexual dimorphism in body mass, as the average weight for females is 1.019 kg (2.25 lb), and 897 g (31.6 oz) for males.

The dorsal pelage is gray-brown, while the ventrum is gray. A "mask" of fur is present on the face; some individuals' masks are lighter and more pronounced than others'. The dorsal aspect of the legs has a white patch. The tail is a rufous-brown.

== Distribution ==
Ramanantsoavana's woolly lemur is endemic to humid rainforests in southeastern Madagascar with an extent of occurrence of 14,376 km^{2} (5,551 sq mi). Its type locality is in the Manombo Special Reserve, south of Farafangana. It also occurs in Vevembe Forest and Midongy du sud National Park. The southern extent of its range is unknown, as are the limits of its distribution with regard to the neighboring species of Peyrieras's woolly lemur (Avahi peyrierasi) and the southern woolly lemur (Avahi meridionalis).

== Conservation status ==
Ramanantsoavana's woolly lemur has not been studied in the wild. It is listed as a vulnerable species by the International Union for the Conservation of Nature's Red List. Its primary threat is habitat loss, which is caused by deforestation for agriculture and timber harvesting, as well as cyclones. Very few infants and juveniles have been reported from the Manombo Special Reserve.
