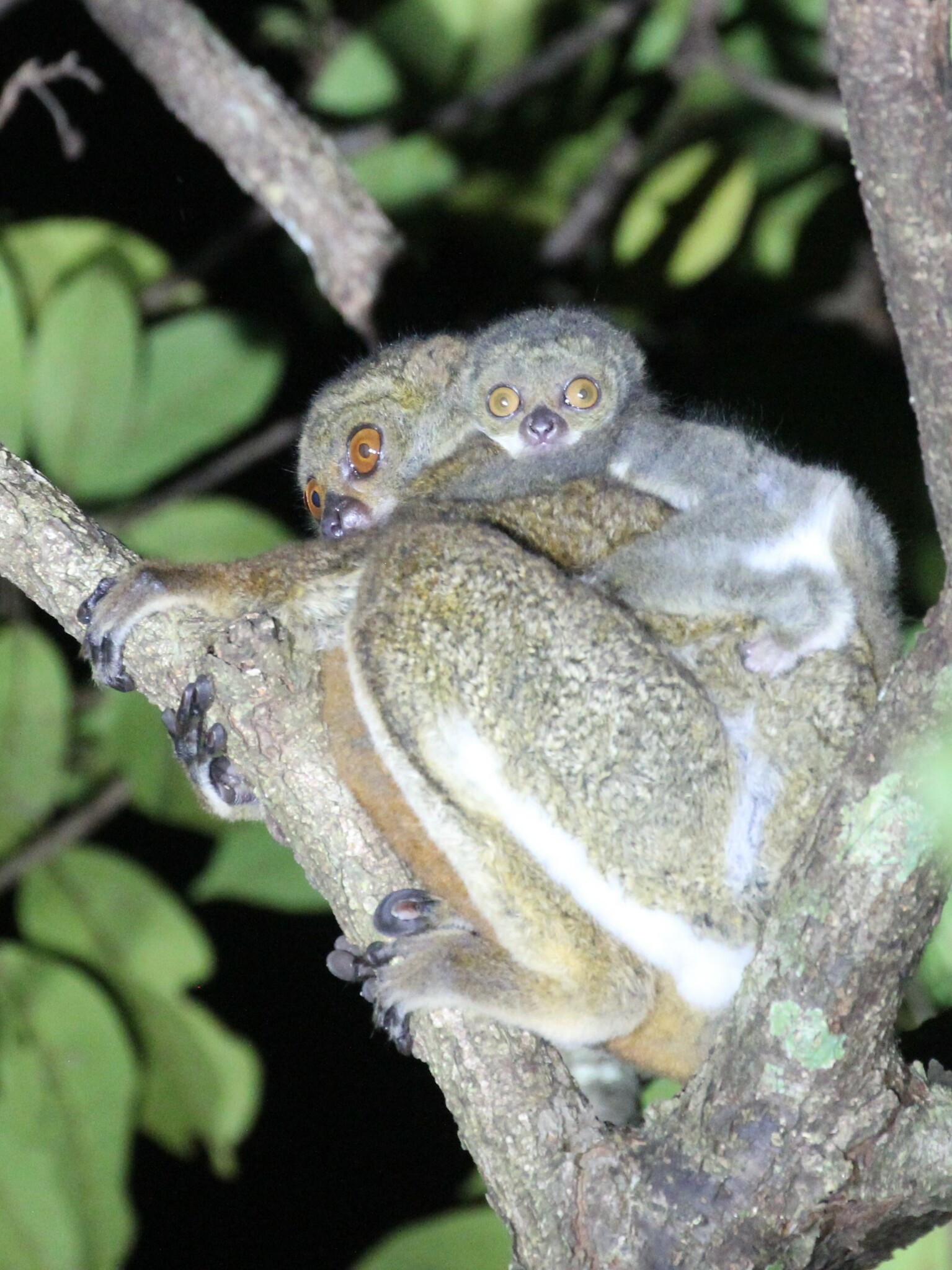

Conservation status
- Endangered (IUCN 3.1)
- CITES Appendix I

Scientific classification
- Kingdom: Animalia
- Phylum: Chordata
- Class: Mammalia
- Order: Primates
- Suborder: Strepsirrhini
- Family: Indriidae
- Genus: Avahi
- Species: A. mooreorum

Binomial name
- Avahi mooreorum Lei et al., 2008
- Distribution of A. mooreorum

= Moore's woolly lemur =

Species of lemur

Moore's woolly lemur (Avahi mooreorum), or the Masoala woolly lemur, is an endangered woolly lemur endemic to Madagascar. It has brown-grey fur and a reddish tail. It is named in honor of the Gordon and Betty Moore Foundation of Palo Alto.

== Description ==
The head-body length of Moore's woolly lemur is 28.4–33 centimeters (11.2–13.0 in), which, combined with a tail length of 29.4–37.2 cm (11.6–14.6 in), totals to 57.8–70.3 cm (22.8–27.7 in). It weighs about 920 g (32 oz).

The pelage is a mixture of light and dark brown shades dorsally, which lightens into a cream color towards the base of the tail. The mask-like facial markings of this species are less defined than they are in other woolly lemurs of the eastern Avahi subgroup. White patches are present beneath each mandible. Moore's woolly lemur possesses the characteristic dorsal white thigh-stripes of woolly lemurs on the posterior aspects of the upper hindlimbs. The tail is a reddish-brown. The ears are hidden by the fur.

== Distribution ==
Moore's woolly lemur is only known to occur in lowland and littoral rainforests in Masoala National Park, as well as some neighboring areas. The extent of occurrence is less than 2,600 km^{2} (1,000 sq mi). The northern extent of the species' territory has not yet been determined.

High densities of Moore's woolly lemurs are associated with the presence of Garcinia commersonii saptrees and Eugenia myrtles. The population density recorded near the village of Ambodiforaha was 93.8 lemurs/km^{2}. It is found in groups of up to four individuals.

== Conservation status ==
Moore's woolly lemur is listed as an endangered species by the IUCN Red List. It faces existential threats in the forms of habitat loss and a relatively high amount of poaching for subsistence consumption.

The only protected area the species occurs in is Masoala National Park. The park was created in 1997, and may be the reason for a large increase in the population density of the species in that area between 1998 and 2017.
