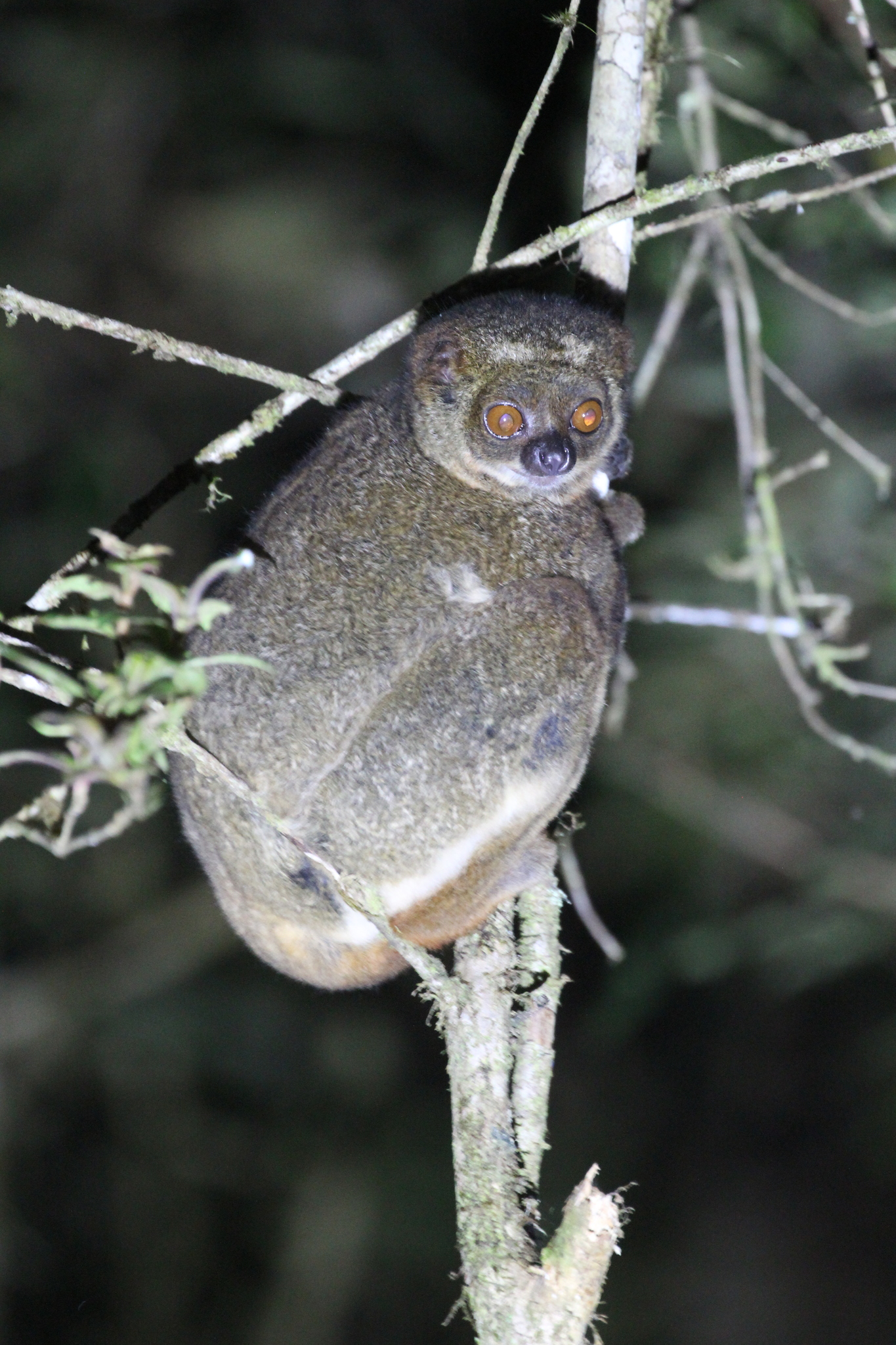
- Near Andasibe, Ambatosoa

Conservation status
- Vulnerable (IUCN 3.1)
- CITES Appendix I

Scientific classification
- Kingdom: Animalia
- Phylum: Chordata
- Class: Mammalia
- Order: Primates
- Suborder: Strepsirrhini
- Family: Indriidae
- Genus: Avahi
- Species: A. laniger

Binomial name
- Avahi laniger (Gmelin, 1788)
- Distribution of A. laniger

Synonyms
- avahi van der Hoeven, 1844; lanatus Wagner, 1840; longicaudatus E. Geoffroy, 1796; orientalis von Lorenz-Liburnau, 1898

= Eastern woolly lemur =

Species of lemur

The eastern woolly lemur (Avahi laniger), also known as the eastern avahi or Gmelin's woolly lemur, is a species of woolly lemur native to eastern Madagascar, where it lives in the wet tropical rainforest at low elevations along the eastern coast of the island.

== Etymology ==
The eastern woolly lemur is locally known as the avahy, fotsife, ampongy, and fotsifaka in Malagasy. The generic name, Avahi, is derived from the Malagasy name avahy, which is in reference to the high-pitched "ava-hee" defensive vocalization produced by the eastern woolly lemur. In French it is called the avahi laineaux oriental or the maki à bourre.

== Description ==
The eastern woolly lemur has a head-body length of 27.7–32.2 cm (10.9–12.7 in) and a tail length of 30.4–36.6 cm (12.0–14.4 in), totaling to a full body length of 58.1–68.8 cm (22.9–27.1 in). Body weights vary between 1 and 1.4 kilograms (2.2 and 3.1 lb). The tail is long and thin, and the hindlimbs are large.

The pelage is short and dense. The dorsum is gray-brown to rufous, which lightens towards a russet-red tail. The ventrum is gray. Distinct patches are found above the eyes. The cheeks and throat are pale. The dorsal aspects of the thighs have conspicuous white patches. The head is small and round, while the eyes are large. The ears are hidden by the fur.

== Behavior ==
Eastern woolly lemurs live in territorial groups of up to five individuals. Social groups are organized based around monogamous breeding pairs and their offspring. The eastern woolly lemur's breeding season ranges from March to May with the baby lemurs being born around August to September. Male woolly lemurs rarely interact with more than one other individual when sleeping, traveling or grooming. At night, a male woolly lemur would spend about 40% of the time with his partner either grooming or resting. Eastern woolly lemurs prefer to sleep on branches or in dense vegetation at an average height of 3 m (9.8 ft).

=== Diet ===
The eastern woolly lemur primarily eats leaves, with occasional supplements of fruit and flowers. The nutrient-deficient leafy diet results in the eastern woolly lemur's lethargic activity budget, whereby it exhibits low levels of activity even during waking hours at night.

== Ecology ==
The eastern woolly lemur is predated upon by Henst's goshawk (Accipiter hentsii).

=== Distribution ===
The eastern woolly lemur is endemic to moist lowland and montane primary and secondary forests in northeastern Madagascar, between the Bemarivo River in the north and the Nesivolo and Mangoro rivers in the south, including Anosibe An'ala, Mangabe, and Tsinjoarivo. Home ranges of social groups are typically 1–2 hectares (2.5–4.9 acres). Population density varies between location. Surveys in Makira Natural Park found that eastern woolly lemurs to be clustered in higher volumes in regenerating secondary forests than in mature forests, with 134 lemurs/km^{2} in the case of the former and 38 lemurs/km^{2} for the latter. Local extinctions will likely result from unsustainable levels of poaching, which may affect the species' distribution.

== Conservation status ==
The eastern woolly lemur is listed as a vulnerable species by the IUCN Red List, and is classified as an Appendix I species by CITES. The primary threat to the species is habitat loss as a result of logging and deforestation for agriculture, resulting in localized declines in population. It is also poached for its meat. Unsustainable poaching will likely result in local extinction events for the species. It was likely recently extirpated from the Ankarana Special Reserve.

It is protected in Analamazaotra, Mananara-Nord, Mantadia, Marojejy, and Zahamena National Parks, as well as in Ambatovaky, Ambohitantely, Anjanaharibe-Sud, and Mangerivola Special Reserves. It is also found in the Tsinjoarivo Classified Forest and the Tsihomanaomby Natural Resources Reserve.
