= Vertical clinging and leaping =

Galago leaping

Vertical clinging and leaping (VCL) is a type of arboreal locomotion seen most commonly among the strepsirrhine primates and haplorrhine tarsiers. The animal begins at rest with its torso upright and elbows fixed, with both hands clinging to a vertical support, such as the side of a tree or bamboo stalk. To move from one support to another, it pushes off from one vertical support with its hindlimbs, landing on another vertical support after an extended period of free flight. Vertical clinging and leaping primates have evolved a specialized anatomy to compensate for the physical implications of this form of locomotion. These key morphological specializations have been identified in prosimian fossils from as early as the Eocene.

== Vertical clinging and leaping primates ==
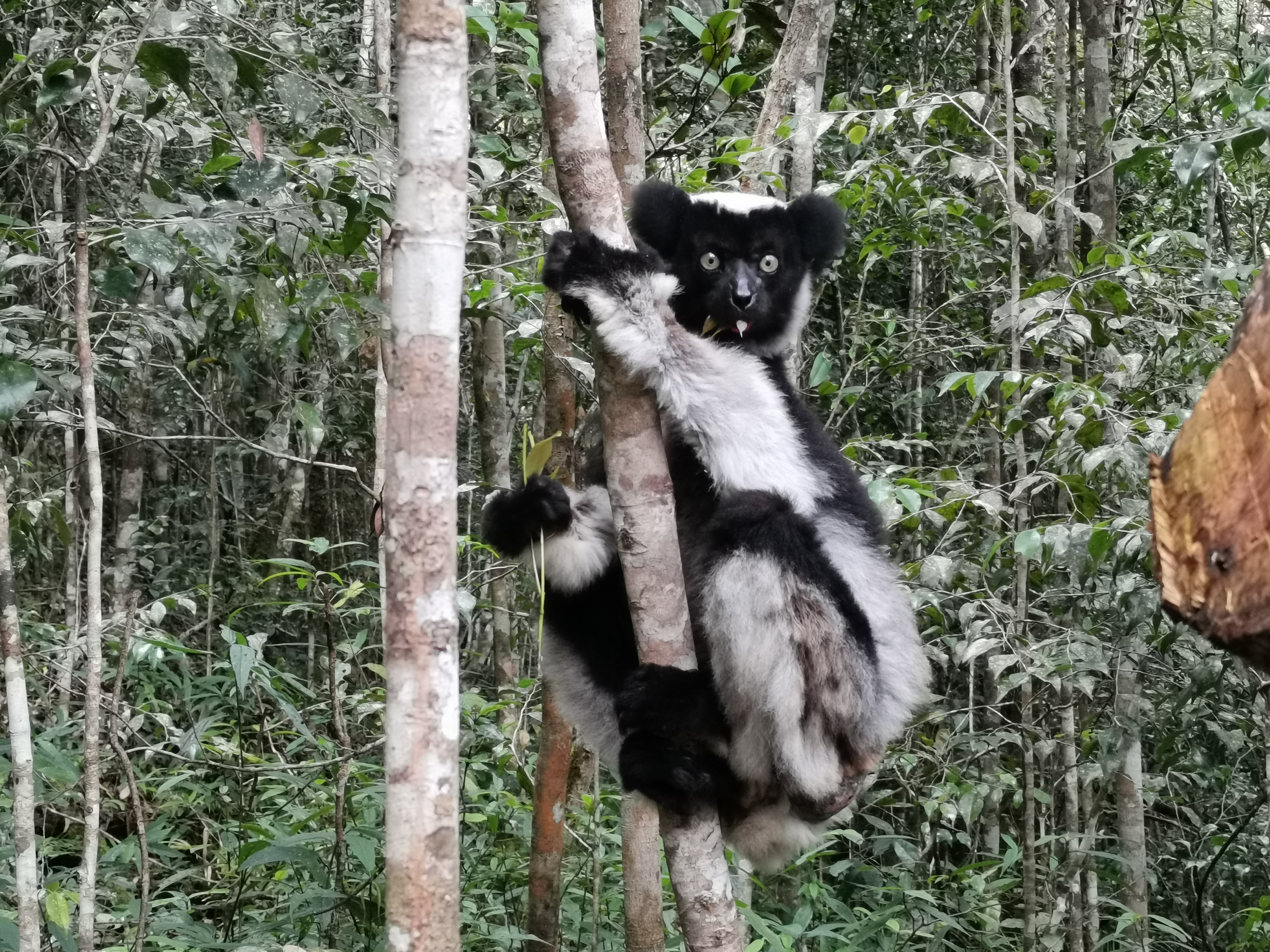
Indri indri clinging to a tree

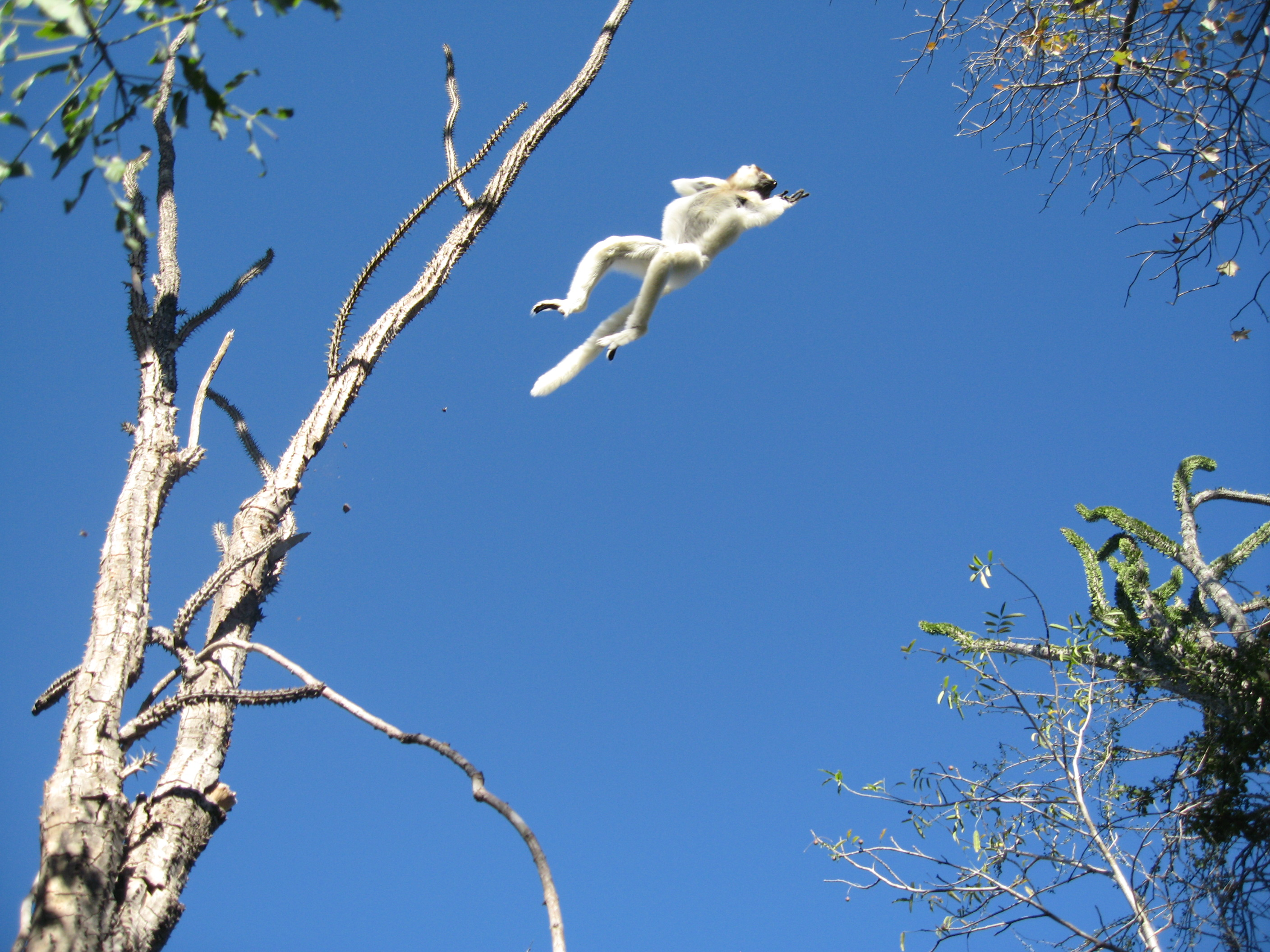
Propithecus verreauxi leaping from tree

P. verreauxi employs a similar form of locomotion on the ground

Vertical clinging and leaping has only been observed in primates, and primarily in prosimians. A few anthropoids have been observed to engage in this behavior, such as Pithecia, and are similar in morphological adaptations to prosimians who rely on VCL.

Vertical clinging and leaping strepsirrhine taxa include:

- Galagidae
- Indriidae
  - Indri
  - Propithecus
  - Avahi
- Lepilemuridae (Lepilemur)
- Prolemur
- Cheirogaleus

Vertical clinging and leaping haplorrhine taxa include:

- Tarsiidae
- Pitheciinae
  - Cacajao
  - Chiropotes
  - Pithecia
- Cebuella
- Callimico
- Saguinus

== Variations in posture ==
Variations in mid-flight posture

=== Variations in mid-flight posture ===
The variations in vertical leaping can be classified into three types based on differences in mid-flight posture:

(A) During the stretched-out vertical cling leap, the femur is extended. (ex. Indriidae)
(B) During the curled-up vertical cling leap, the torso is sub-orthograde with all limbs positioned in front of the body. (ex. Galago)
(C) During the limbs-down vertical cling leap, the torso is pronograde, with all limbs positioned underneath the body. (ex. Cheirogaleus)

=== Variations in clinging posture ===
There is an array of clinging postures that primates use while foraging and resting in trees. These postures include sitting, bipedal standing, squatting, forelimb suspension, forelimb-hindlimb suspension and more. Stabilization is key to how a primate positions themselves while clinging. The placement of the torso depends on the weight distribution between the hands, feet, and tail. Vertical clinging and leaping primates may also use their tails to grip adjacent branches in order to stabilize their positional modes.

== Morphological specializations ==
Locomotion and movement are the main contributing factors to primate's body shape and structure, thus the anatomy of vertical climbers and leapers is highly specialized to enable them to move effectively within their arboreal habitat. Features found in the hips, knees, feet, hands, arms, and tails are specialized to facilitate climbing and leaping in primates, and aids in other postures such as tail suspensions and foot hanging. With the features described, these primates can move through trees efficiently and obtain food easily. Body size also has a direct correlation to how fast and how far a primate can leap. There are other musculoskeletal specializations that differentiate VCL dependent primates, such as their hip joints and muscles. Leaping primates have more proximally positioned lesser and third trochanters, and have relatively large muscles for hip extensors, knee extensors or ankle plantar flexors. This is an adaptation that has come from the increased need for hind limb propulsion.

The evolution of key features of VCL primate anatomy can be explained by analyzing how they leap. Longer limbs allow for enhanced locomotive abilities. Leaping requires primates to achieve a certain height and distance and then land on a vertical support. Longer hindlimbs therefore allow more time and distance for acceleration and takeoff, so longer and stronger femurs evolved because they increase the distance over which acceleration occurs. Additionally, during landing, longer limbs help with the deceleration of the body, since hindlimb length is directly proportional to the time required for landing. Therefore, longer limbs provide more time for deceleration and can prevent injury after landing with high velocity.

== Launch point considerations ==
=== Launch point branch diameter ===
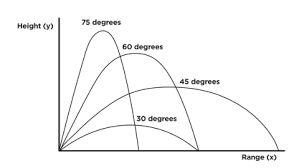
Launch angles vary depending on height and range needs

Before leaping, primates must fundamentally consider the distance they are traveling and the stability in their launch point and landing point. A large branch is preferable to a small branch as a launch point, as the wider diameter provides a sturdier base for the jump and also reduces the energy expended during takeoff. In fact, tarsiers have been observed climb to lower heights in order to leap from and land on larger diameter branches. However, this also limits the height of the leap, as the primate must be able to land on a branch that is large enough to stabilize the animal and also minimize the energy necessary for maintaining balance during landing.

=== Launch point angle ===
Launch angle does not appear to be species-specific, and the range of angles varies between 30 and 70 degrees. The optimum ballistic trajectory angle would be 45 degrees, but often the animal will need to cover more horizontal than vertical distance, or vice versa. In these cases, a trajectory other than 45 degrees would be more beneficial to give more height or more range (see photo), so vertical clinging and leaping animals adjust their launch angles accordingly to compensate for this.

== Fossil evidence ==
=== Locomotor adaptations in Eocene prosimians ===
Ida, an early Eocene primate fossil who provided the first evidence of vertical clinging and leaping

There is evidence of vertical clinging and leaping adaptations in the postcranial skeleton of early Eocene fossils of prosimians. Lacking any common quadrupedal features, the postcranial bones and fossils of the Eocene prosimians most closely resemble the specializations of vertical clingers and leapers. Common morphological elements identified in these early fossils include a high phalangeal index, low intermembral index, femurs with cylindrical head and high, narrow patellar grooves, and fused fibula and tibia. The high phalangeal index is the elongation of the phalangeal finger bones, which helps vertical clingers who require increased prehensile power in their hands to support their large bulk. The low intermembral index is the total length of the humerus and radius in percentage of total length of the femur and tibia. The features of the femur is part of an evolution of elongated femurs that helps the primates' extreme range of flexion and extension, which allows them to perform their leaps. Thus, VCL seems to be the only known locomotor adaptation in the Eocene primates, meaning it is one of, if not the earliest, locomotor adaptations.

=== Early Eocene primate fossil: Ida ===
The earliest evidence of VCL can be found in an early Eocene adolescent primate, named Ida. She exhibited legs that were longer than her arms, suggesting that leaping was a key aspect of her locomotion. Her death is hypothesized to be linked to her vicinity to the Messel Pit, near Frankfurt, Germany. The hot magma from the earth mixing with the underground water tables led to explosions that released toxic gasses. Ida was found with a broken wrist, and it is believed that due to this, she could not leap or cling to the higher tree branches, and therefore had to stay lower to the ground where she came into contact with the toxic gasses and died.
