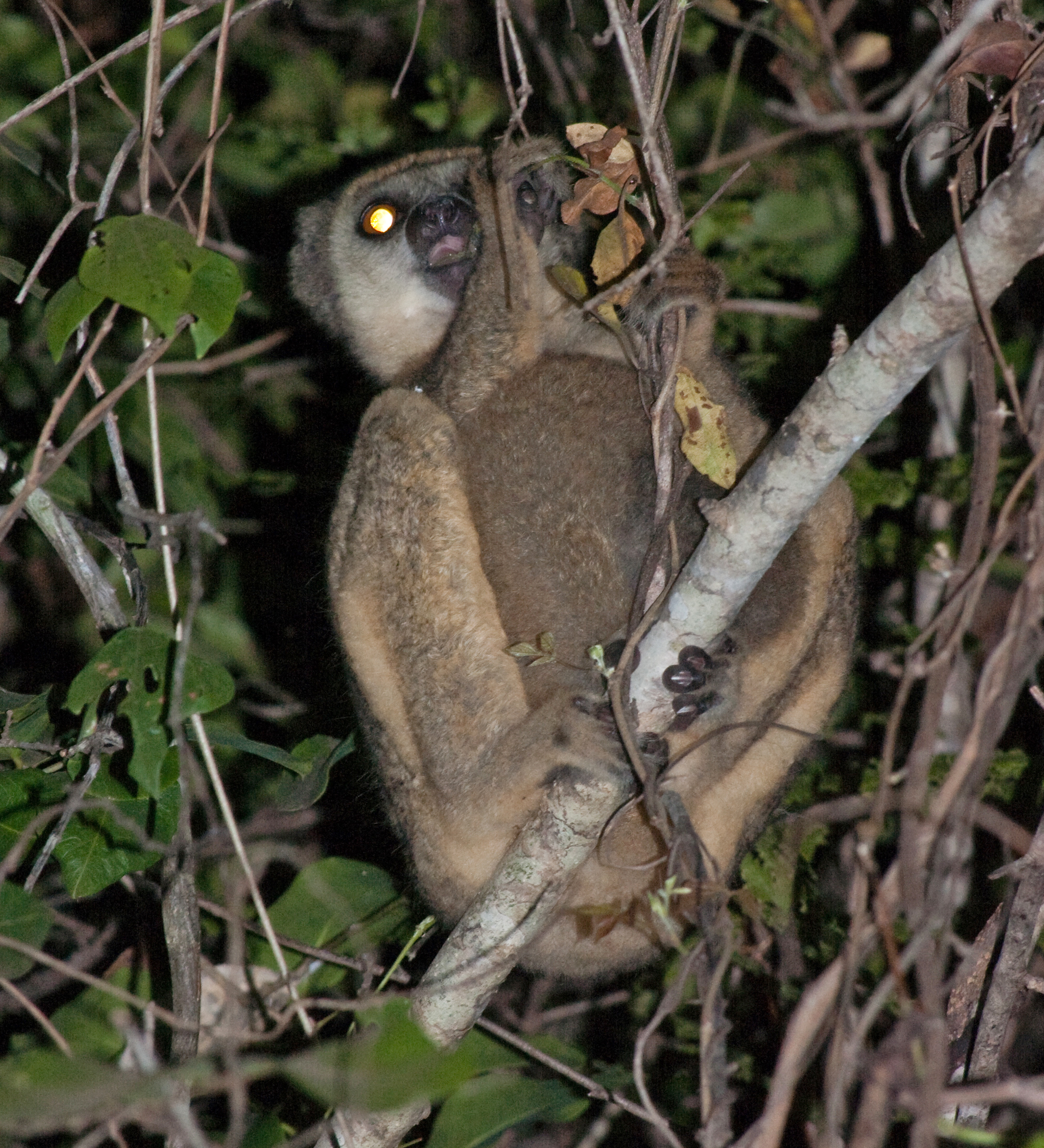

Conservation status
- Vulnerable (IUCN 3.1)
- CITES Appendix I

Scientific classification
- Kingdom: Animalia
- Phylum: Chordata
- Class: Mammalia
- Order: Primates
- Suborder: Strepsirrhini
- Family: Indriidae
- Genus: Avahi
- Species: A. occidentalis

Binomial name
- Avahi occidentalis Lorenz von Liburnau, 1898
- Distribution of A. occidentalis

= Western woolly lemur =

Species of lemur

The western woolly lemur or western avahi (Avahi occidentalis) is a species of woolly lemur native to western Madagascar, where they live in dry deciduous forests. It is a folivorous species.

The western woolly lemurs live in monogamous pairs together with their offspring.

== Description ==
The western woolly lemur is one of the smallest avahis. It has a head-body length of 26.9–30.3 centimeters (10.6–11.9 in) with a tail length of 30.7–37.7 cm (12.1–14.8 in), totaling to 57.6–68.2 cm (22.7–26.9 in). Body weights range between 800 and 1,100 grams (28 and 39 oz). Its facial fur is white, white-grey, or cream, and forms an outline that contrasts with its surrounding facial features. There is a small darker spot of fur above the nose within the facial outline, and the light facial hair extends below the ears. The eyes have a yellow-brown tint and are surrounded by a circle of black, hairless skin. The nose is black and hairless, and the hair surrounding the nose has a white tint. Its head and body is a brown-grey or yellowish-brown color, and the fur is lightly curled and may appear freckled (some may have a darker color along the back). The tail is pale gray or has tints of grayish-beige, but can also have tints of red, and occasionally, some will have a white tip. On the chest, belly, and inner parts of the body, the fur is fairly thin, light beige, cream, or of an apricot color.

== Behavior ==
Western woolly lemurs travel in pairs with their mate and offspring. These pairs are female-dominated and usually very peaceful. However, if conflicts do arise, they are always initiated and resolved by the female. The female Western woolly lemur also is known for not showing submission towards a male partner.

=== Diet ===
The western woolly lemur mostly consumes leaves and buds that derive from around 20 different plants which have not matured and have high levels of sugars and proteins. The food is typically consumed within the time frame of two hours before dawn and two hours after dusk, in which the lemurs consume their food at the tops of trees ranging between 2 and 9 m (6 ft 7 in and 29 ft 6 in). While feeding, lemurs typically settle on thinner branches unless the tree itself is too small to support the animal's weight. Because of its folivorous diet, the western woolly lemur spends large amounts of time resting in order to conserve energy.

== Distribution ==
The western woolly lemur is endemic to two disconnected ranges in northwestern Madagascar, to the east and north of the Betsiboka River, up to the Bay of Narindra. It is also found in Ankarafantsika National Park and the Mariarano Classified Forest. It was previously found in the region of Ankarafantsika National Park to the north of its present ranges, however it was likely extirpated from that area. The area of occupancy adds to 3,057 km^{2} (1,180 sq mi). The IUCN estimates that a 78% reduction in the species' range will occur between the years 2000 and 2080.

== Conservation status ==
The western woolly lemur is classified as a vulnerable species by the IUCN Red List. Because the Avahi as a species is highly selective in their folivorous diet, depending on plants with specific characteristics, it is hard to keep Avahi in captivity. Therefore, one of the primary and most general ways of conserving the species is to conserve the forests in which Avahi are currently found.
