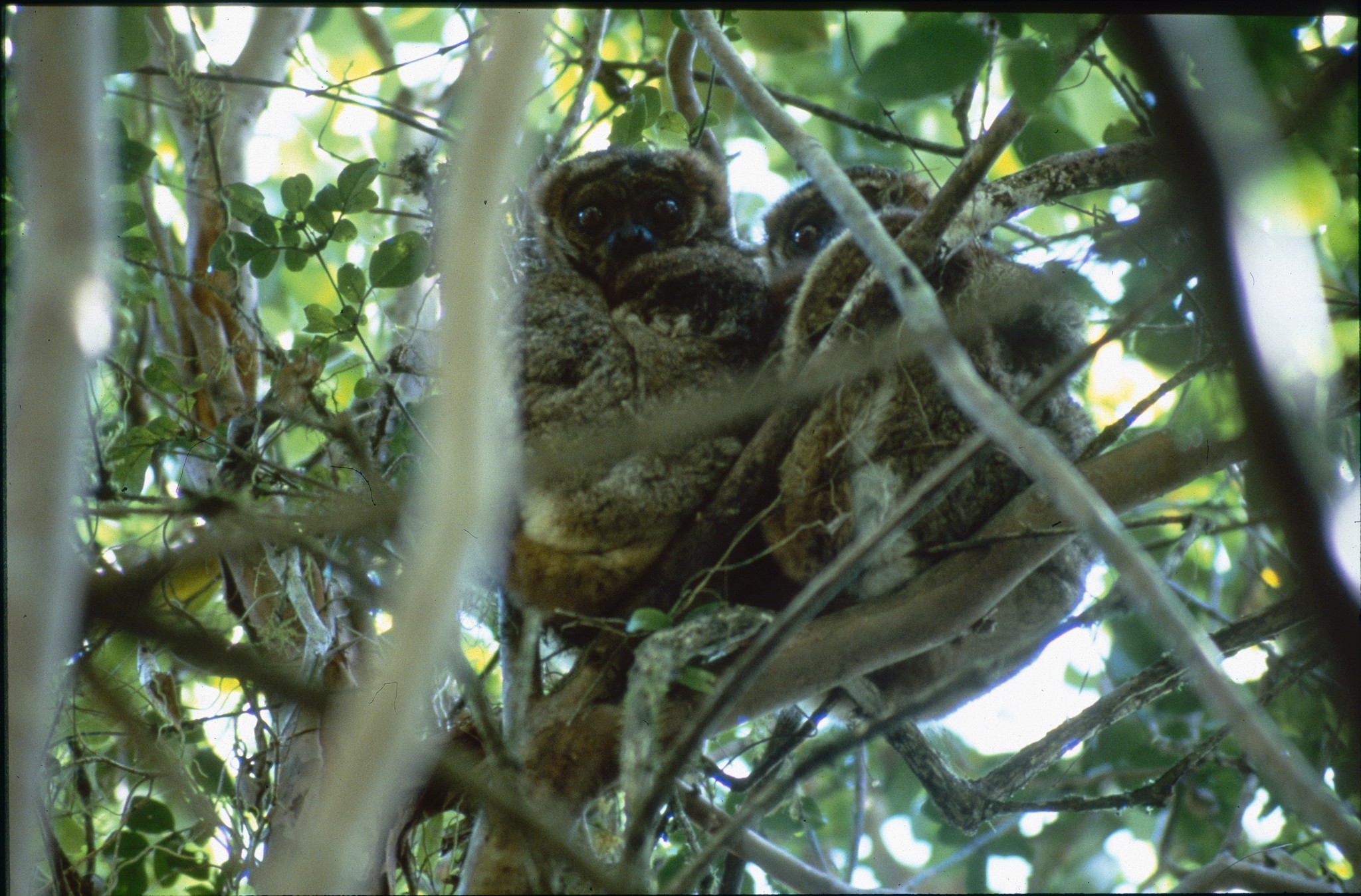

Conservation status
- Vulnerable (IUCN 3.1)
- CITES Appendix I

Scientific classification
- Kingdom: Animalia
- Phylum: Chordata
- Class: Mammalia
- Order: Primates
- Suborder: Strepsirrhini
- Family: Indriidae
- Genus: Avahi
- Species: A. peyrierasi

Binomial name
- Avahi peyrierasi Zaramody et al., 2006
- Distribution of A. peyrierasi

= Peyrieras's woolly lemur =

Species of lemur

Peyrieras's woolly lemur or Peyrieras's avahi (Avahi peyrierasi) is a species of woolly lemur endemic to lowland and montane rainforests in southeastern Madagascar.

== Description ==
Peyrieras's woolly lemur has a head-body length of 2.61–31.7 centimeters (1.03–12.48 in) and a tail length of 28.5–34.4 cm (11.2–13.5 in), totaling to a full body length of 54.7–66.6 cm (21.5–26.2 in). It weighs between 0.9 and 1.2 kilograms (2.0 and 2.6 lb), averaging at about 1 kg (2.2 lb).

Dorsally, the pelage is gray-brown. The ventrum can either be gray or white. The tail is red-brown. The thigs are gray-brown anteriorly and are white posteriorly. Small white bands are present along the dorsum of the legs, which are also present on the ventral aspect of the legs in some individuals. There is variation in the facial pelage; the face is sometimes encircled by a white border. White bears and cheeks also occur in some individuals.

Rambinintsoa Andriantompohavana and colleagues identified two "types" of Peyrieras's woolly lemur in 2007. Runhua Lei and colleagues later found there to be three sympatric types near Ranomafana National Park. They assigned two of these types to a species complex shared with the Betsileo woolly lemur (A. betsileo), and speculated that the third type could potentially be a unique species. As of 2023, the taxonomic statuses of these three types has not been reexamined.

== Behavior ==
Peyrieras's woolly lemur is nocturnal and arboreal. Its diet is approximately consists of 98% leaves, which is supplemented by a small amount of flowers and fruits. In one study, the young leaves of dragon's blood tree (Harungana madagascariensis) and lillipillies (Syzygium sp.) comprised 67.5% of the diets of observed individuals at Vatoharanana in Ranomafana. This preference for young leaves may have contributed to the evolution of color vision in the species.

A study in Ranomafana found that Peyrieras's woolly lemur spent 56.5% of the night resting.

== Distribution ==
Peyrieras's woolly lemur is found in primary humid lowland and montane rainforests in southeastern Madagascar. It also occurs in secondary and disturbed forest fragments. It occurs south of the Mangoro/Nesivolo river systems in Manara, Vatoalatsaka, Sangalampona, and Mahasoarivo forests. The type locality is in Ranomafana National Park. It also occurs in Andringitra National Park, the municipality of Kianjavato, and the corridor between Andringitra and Ranomafana National Parks.

The boundaries of its distribution are not certain; the borders of the ranges of the Betsileo woolly lemur in the Fandriana District and Ramanantsoavana's woolly lemur (A. ramanantsoavanai) in the Manombo Special Reserve and Vevembe are tentatively considered the edges of Peyrieras's woolly lemur's range. The northern and southern boundaries have yet to be ascertained, however it is possible that the southern boundary is the Manampatrana River.

Home ranges are approximately 1 hectare (2.5 acres) in size. Studies have found contradictory correlations between population density, habitat disturbance, and canopy heights.

== Conservation status ==
Peyrieras's woolly lemur is listed as a vulnerable species by the International Union for Conservation of Nature's Red List, and is scheduled under CITES Appendix I. Both habitat loss and poaching threaten the species, though poaching for consumption is a less pressing danger than it is for other species because of the bitter taste of A. peyrierasi's meat. A population decline of at least 30% in anticipated to occur between 2020 and 2050.
