= Betsileo woolly lemur =

Conservation status
- Endangered (IUCN 3.1)
- CITES Appendix I

Scientific classification
- Kingdom: Animalia
- Phylum: Chordata
- Class: Mammalia
- Order: Primates
- Suborder: Strepsirrhini
- Family: Indriidae
- Genus: Avahi
- Species: A. betsileo

Binomial name
- Avahi betsileo Andriantompohavana et al., 2007
- Distribution of A. betsileo

Species of lemur

The Betsileo woolly lemur or Betsileo avahi (Avahi betsileo) is an endangered species of woolly lemur native to high-altitudes environments in the Fandriana District of east-central Madagascar.

The Betsileo woolly lemur lemur is an arboreal, herbivorous, nocturnal, female-dominant primate. It is a vertical clinging and leaping species endemic to the eastern rainforests.

== Description ==
The Betsileo woolly lemur has a head-body length of 26–31.1 centimeters (10.2–12.2 in), a tail length of 28.3–34.4 cm (11.1–13.5 in), amounting to a total body length of 48–58.9 cm (18.9–23.2 in). Body weights range between 0.9 and 1.2 kilograms (2.0 and 2.6 lb).

The pelage differs significantly from those of the other eastern woolly lemurs in that it is primarily light-reddish brown on the dorsal aspect, while it is gray under the jaw and on the extremities. The gray color of the ventral aspect darkens towards the midline, whereas it lightens towards the extremities. The tail is rusty red, and is darker on the dorsal aspect than it is on the ventral surface, which approaches reddish-blonde. The Betsileo woolly lemur has a distinct facial "mask," with grayish pelage beneath the jaw that contrasts against cream-colored eyebrow markings. The pelage is thicker on the head than other eastern woolly lemurs, which gives its face a more rounded shape than those of its congeners.

== Distribution ==
The Betsileo woolly lemur has only been found in the higher altitudes of Bemosary Classified Forest in the Fandriana District. Its full distribution is estimated to be from south of the Mangoro River to north of the Mananjary River. The extent of occurrence is estimated to be less than 1,470 km^{2} (570 sq mi).

== Conservation ==
Avahi betsileo is classified as an endangered species by the IUCN Red List. It has not been studied in the wild.

The primary threat to the survival of the Betsileo woolly lemur is habitat loss and degradation. The habitat of this species is now less than 1,500 km^{2} (580 sq mi) due to the impact of deforestation in Madagascar. It does not occur in any protected areas other than the Bemosary Classified Forest, which does not offer much protection for the species. The Betsileo woolly lemur's habitat is used as a source of illegal Malagasy moonshine rum known as toaka gasy, which is mostly made from sugarcane.
