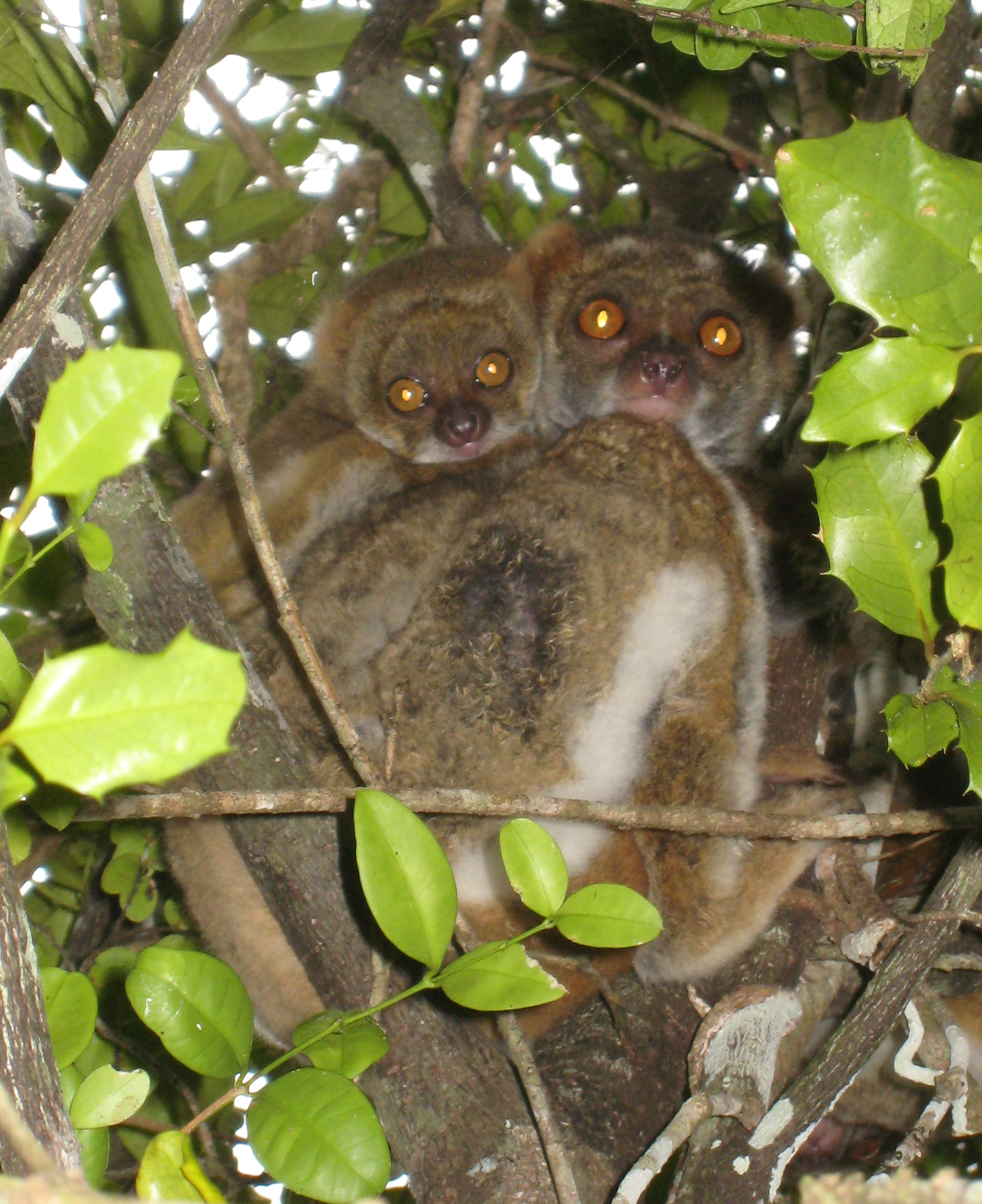

Conservation status
- Endangered (IUCN 3.1)
- CITES Appendix I

Scientific classification
- Kingdom: Animalia
- Phylum: Chordata
- Class: Mammalia
- Infraclass: Placentalia
- Order: Primates
- Suborder: Strepsirrhini
- Family: Indriidae
- Genus: Avahi
- Species: A. meridionalis

Binomial name
- Avahi meridionalis Zaramody et al., 2006
- Distribution of A. meridionalis

= Southern woolly lemur =

Species of lemur

The southern woolly lemur (Avahi meridionalis), or southern avahi, has been recently recognized as a separate species of woolly lemur in 2006 by Zaramody et al. It is a nocturnal and pair-living species. Groups can range from 2 (the parental pair only) to 5 individuals (including the offspring of subsequent years). A study in Sainte Luce forest revealed home range varied from 2.2 to 3.5 ha and that males can have larger home range and cover longer daily distances than females (which can spend more time feeding), in agreement with the territory defence and mate guarding hypotheses.

== Distribution ==
The species is restricted to the reserve of Andohahela, Sainte Luce and Ambatotsirongorongo. Further studies are required to determine the exact distribution range and especially the limits with its sister species Peyrieras' woolly lemur (A. peyrierasi). In southeastern littoral forests, sympatric lemur species of Avahi meridionalis are the brown mouse lemur (Microcebus rufus), the greater dwarf lemur (Cheirogaleus major), the fat-tailed dwarf lemur Cheirogaleus medius and the collared brown lemur (Eulemur collaris) in Sainte Luce Forest, and the southern lesser bamboo lemur (Hapalemur meridionalis) in Mandena Forest.

== Description ==
Dorsal fur is grey-brown toning down to light grey distally, while ventrum is grey. The tail is red-brown and darkens distally. The southern woolly lemur has a mean weight of 1.2 kg (2.6 lb) for females and 1.1 kg (2.4 lb) for males, with a mean head-body length of 27 cm (11 in) and 25 cm (9.8 in) for females and males, respectively.

== Diet ==
Avahi meridionalis eats leaves (and buds) and, much more rarely, flowers and appears not to base food choice on abundance. Avahi meridionalis can eat adult leaves with higher content of easily soluble protein (than non-food leaves) and switch, as soon as possible, on young leaves, richer in crude protein, and poorer in acid detergent fiber and sugar. In Sainte Luce, A. meridionalis also ate leaves with condensed tannins, alkaloids, and intermediate concentrations of polyphenolics. Contrary to previous studies that considered Avahi spp. a specialist, A. meridionalis acted as leaf eating generalists with moderate selectivity, based on nutritional quality and tolerance of a wide array of plant secondary metabolites.

== Conservation ==
The southern woolly lemur lives primarily in fragments of south-eastern rain littoral forest of Madagascar (Mandena and Sainte Luce). Degradation level, more than fragment size, seems to affect density and birth rates of the populations of this species.
