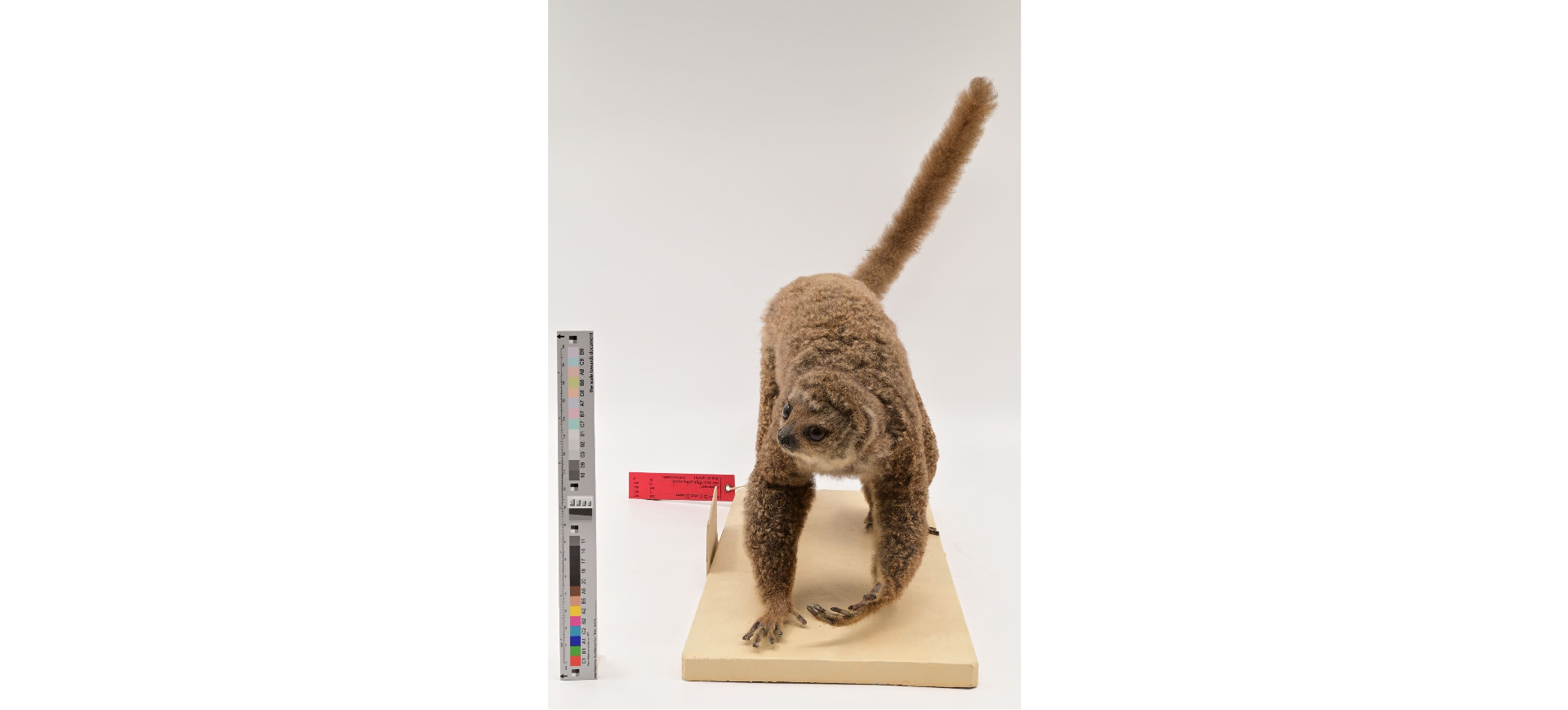

Conservation status
- Critically Endangered (IUCN 3.1)
- CITES Appendix I

Scientific classification
- Kingdom: Animalia
- Phylum: Chordata
- Class: Mammalia
- Order: Primates
- Suborder: Strepsirrhini
- Family: Indriidae
- Genus: Avahi
- Species: A. unicolor

Binomial name
- Avahi unicolor Thalmann & Geissmann, 2000
- Distribution of A. unicolor

= Sambirano woolly lemur =

Species of lemur

The Sambirano woolly lemur (Avahi unicolor), also known as the Sambirano avahi or unicolor woolly lemur, is a species of woolly lemur native to western Madagascar.

== Description ==
The head-body length ranges between 23 and 31 centimeters (9.1 and 12.2 in), with a tail length of 26.5–30.3 cm (10.4–11.9 in), totaling to a length of 57.5–66 cm (22.6–26.0 in). The average body weight is 0.7–1 kilogram (1.5–2.2 lb).

The fur of the head and body is a light gray-beige, and has a sightly curled, freckled appearance. Its tail is gray-brown or reddish-brown, while the base is a pale brown or cream color. The back is slightly darker in the shoulder-blade area. The lower body's limbs are an off-white color, while the fur on the chest, belly, and inner limbs is fairly thin and light-gray in color. The ventral coat is thinner than the dorsal coat. The face itself is slightly more pale than the upper head, which creates a slight contrasting facial outline caused by a variation in fur length and consistency, as the facial hair is short and not curled in comparison to the rest of the body. The contrasting facial outline has a small fur spot above the nose and the forehead that presents the appearance of a dark line. The eyes are maroon with black, hairless eyelids. The snout is also black and hairless, with the corners of the mouth having a white tint. The tail can be dark gray-brown or red-brown, with the base having a lighter cream color. A triangular, beige pygal patch is present superior to the base of the tail.

== Distribution ==
The Sambirano woolly lemur is endemic to the moist lowland forests of the Ampasindava Peninsula in northwestern Madagascar. It is found from sea level to 1,600 metres (5,200 ft) above sea level, and at higher altitudes in the Sambirano forests. Its range includes the forests south of the Sambirano River and west of the Manongarivo Special Reserve. The probable limit of the species' range in the south is the Andranomalaza or Maevarano River. This species is very poorly known, as only a few specimens have been found.

It has also been observed in the Anaborano Forest, south of the Maromiandra Forest, adjacent to the Antafondro Classified Forest.

== Conservation status ==
As it is not known to what degree the species is hunted, deforestation is probably the primary threat to the species' survival. It is listed on Appendix I of CITES. Since there are only a few known specimens in protected areas, additional research is necessary to fully evaluate its conservation status. The only protected areas the Sambirano woolly lemur occurs in are the Anaborano Classified Forest and the western slopes of the Manongarivo Special Reserve.
