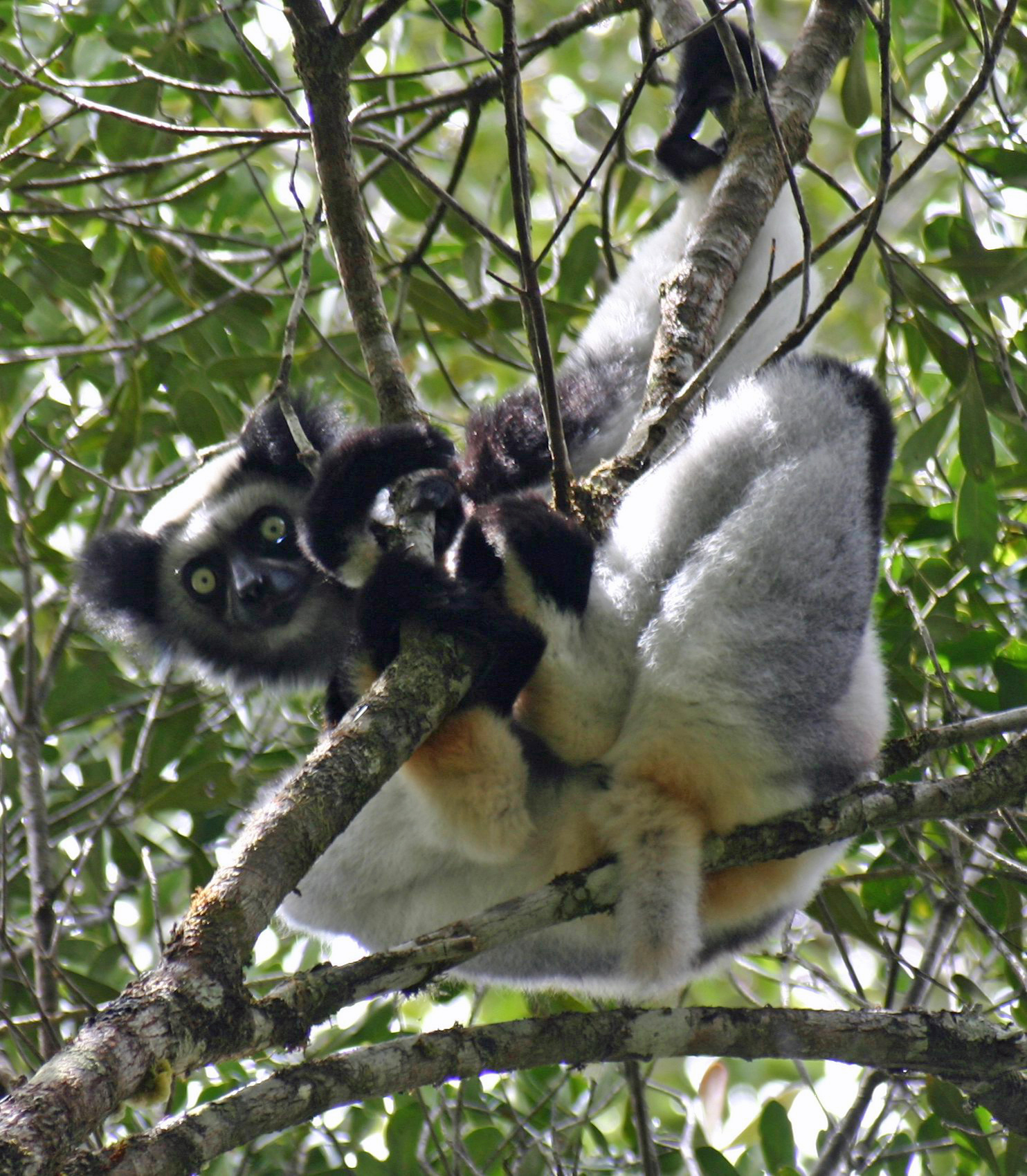
- Indri (Indri indri)

Conservation status
- CITES Appendix I

Scientific classification
- Kingdom: Animalia
- Phylum: Chordata
- Class: Mammalia
- Infraclass: Placentalia
- Order: Primates
- Suborder: Strepsirrhini
- Superfamily: Lemuroidea
- Family: Indriidae; Burnett, 1828

Type genus
- Indri É. Geoffroy & G. Cuvier, 1796

Genera
- Indri; Avahi; Propithecus
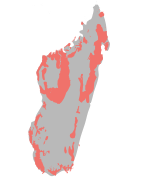
- Indriidae distribution

Synonyms
- Lichanotina Gray, 1825; Indrisina Geoffroy Saint-Hilaire, 1851; Indrisidae Alston, 1878; Indrisinae Mivart, 1864; Indriidae Hill, 1953; Indriinae Hill, 1953; Propitheci Winge, 1895; Propithecinae Trouessart, 1897

= Indriidae =

Family of lemurs

The Indriidae (formerly spelled Indridae) are a family of strepsirrhine primates. They are medium- to large-sized lemurs, with only four teeth in the toothcomb instead of the usual six. Indriids, like all lemurs, live exclusively on the island of Madagascar.

== Classification ==
The 19 living species in the family are divided into three genera.

Family Indriidae

- Genus Indri
  - Indri, Indri indri
- Genus Avahi, woolly lemurs
  - Bemaraha woolly lemur, Avahi cleesei
  - Eastern woolly lemur, Avahi laniger
  - Moore's woolly lemur, Avahi mooreorum
  - Western woolly lemur, Avahi occidentalis
  - Sambirano woolly lemur, Avahi unicolor
  - Peyrieras's woolly lemur, Avahi peyrierasi
  - Southern woolly lemur, Avahi meridionalis
  - Ramanantsoavana's woolly lemur, Avahi ramanantsoavani
  - Betsileo woolly lemur, Avahi betsileo
- Genus Propithecus, sifakas
  - Propithecus diadema group
    - Diademed sifaka, Propithecus diadema
    - Silky sifaka, Propithecus candidus
    - Milne-Edwards's sifaka, Propithecus edwardsi
    - Perrier's sifaka, Propithecus perrieri
    - Golden-crowned sifaka, Propithecus tattersalli
  - Propithecus verreauxi group
    - Verreaux's sifaka, Propithecus verreauxi
    - Coquerel's sifaka, Propithecus coquereli
    - Decken's sifaka, Propithecus deckenii
    - Crowned sifaka, Propithecus coronatus

== Characteristics ==
The 19 extant Indriidae species vary considerably in size. Not counting the length of their tails, the avahis are only 30 cm (12 in) in length, while the indri is the largest extant strepsirrhine. The tail of the indri is only a stub, while avahi and the sifaka tails are as long as their bodies. Their fur is long and mostly from whitish over reddish up to grey. Their black faces, however, are always bald. The hind legs are longer than their fore limbs, their hands are long and thin, and their thumbs cannot be opposed to the other fingers correctly.

All species are arboreal, though they do come to the ground occasionally. When on the ground, they stand upright and move with short hops forward, with their arms held high. In the trees, though, they can make extraordinary leaps and are extremely agile, able to change direction from tree to tree. Like most leaf eaters, they adjust for the low nutrient content of their food by long rests. Often, they can be seen lying stretched on trees sunning themselves. Indriidae live together in family federations up to 15 animals, communicating with roars and facial expressions.

Indriidae are herbivores, eating mostly leaves, fruits, and flowers. Like some other herbivores, they have a large cecum, containing bacteria that ferment cellulose, allowing for more efficient digestion of plant matter. They have fewer premolar teeth than other lemurs, with the dental formula of: 2.1.2.32.1.2.3

Females and males usually mate monogamously for many years. Mostly at the end of the dry season, their four- to five-month gestation ends with the birth of a single offspring, which lives in the family for a while after its weaning (at the age of five to six months).

== See also ==
- Holocene extinction event
