= Ludwig Lorenz von Liburnau =

Ludwig Lorenz von Liburnau (26 August 1856 in Fiume – 9 December 1943 in St. Gilgen) was an Austrian zoologist. He was the son of naturalist Josef Roman Lorenz von Liburnau (1825–1911).

In 1879 he obtained his PhD from the University of Vienna, receiving his habilitation in zoology in 1898. From 1880 to 1922 he was associated with the Naturhistorisches Museum in Vienna.

In 1899 he was the first scientist to provide analysis of Hadropithecus stenognathus (an extinct species of lemur), a study based on a mandible discovered by fossil collector Franz Sikora at Andrahomana cave in southeastern Madagascar. At the time, Lorenz believed the specimen to be the mandible of an anthropoid primate species.

The North Island kaka (Nestor meridionalis septentrionalis), a nationally endangered bird from New Zealand, was named by Lorenz in 1896. The western avahi (Avahi occidentalis), a species he described in 1898, is sometimes referred to as "Lorenz von Liburnau’s woolly lemur".

== Publications ==
- Über einige Reste ausgestorbener Primaten von Madagaskar. — Denkschr., 70, S. 1 — 15, 3 Abb., 3 Taf., Wien 1900.
- Über Hadropithecus stenognathus Lz. nebst Bemerkungen zu einigen anderen ausgestorbenen Primaten von Madagaskar. — Denkschr., 72, S. 1 — 12, 2 Taf., Wien 1901.
