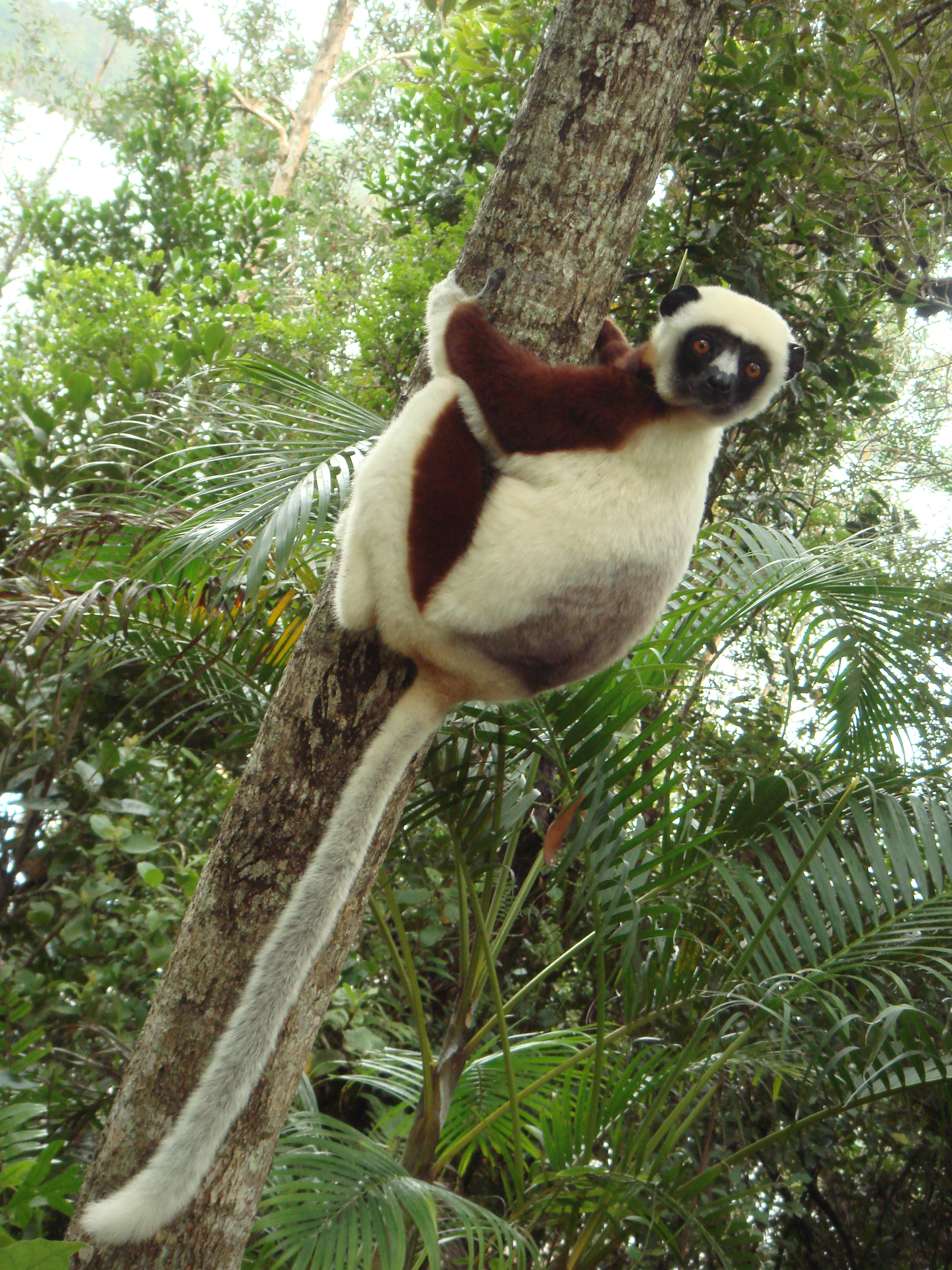
- Coquerel's sifaka (P. coquereli)

Conservation status
- CITES Appendix I

Scientific classification
- Kingdom: Animalia
- Phylum: Chordata
- Class: Mammalia
- Order: Primates
- Suborder: Strepsirrhini
- Family: Indriidae
- Genus: Propithecus; Bennett, 1832

Type species
- Propithecus diadema Bennett, 1832

Diversity
- 9 species
- Combined distribution of Propithecus

Synonyms
- Macromerus A. Smith, 1833

= Sifaka =

Sifakas

Genus of lemur

A sifaka (/sɪˈfɑːkə/; Malagasy pronunciation: [ˈsifakə̥]) is a lemur of the genus Propithecus from the family Indriidae within the order Primates. The common name is an onomatopoeia of their characteristic "shi-fak" alarm call. Like all lemurs, they are found only on the island of Madagascar. All species of sifakas are threatened, ranging from endangered to critically endangered.

== Anatomy and physiology ==
Sifakas are medium-sized indriids with a head and body length of 40 to 55 cm (16 to 22 in) and a weight of 3 to 6 kg (6.6 to 13.2 lb). Their tail is just as long as their body, which differentiates them from the Indri. Their fur is long and silky, with coloration varying by species from yellowish-white to blackish-brown. Their round, hairless face is always black. As with all lemurs, the sifaka has special adaptations for grooming, including a toilet-claw on its second toe and a toothcomb.

Sifakas move by vertical clinging and leaping, meaning they maintain an upright position leaping from tree trunk to tree trunk and moving along branches. They are skillful climbers and powerful jumpers, able to make leaps up to 10 m (32.8 ft) from one tree to the next. On the ground, they move like all indrids, with bipedal, sideways leaping movements of the hind legs, holding their fore limbs up for balance. Sifakas are diurnal and arboreal.

Sifakas are herbivores, eating leaves, flowers, and fruits. When not searching for food, they spend a good part of the day sunbathing, stretched on the branches. Sifakas live in larger groups than the other indrids (up to 13 animals). They have a firm territory, which they mark with scent glands. Edges of different sifaka territories can overlap. Though they defend their territory from invasion by others of their species, they may peacefully co-exist with other lemur species such as the red-bellied lemur and the common brown lemur. Successful invasions are known to result in death of male members, group takeover, and infanticide.

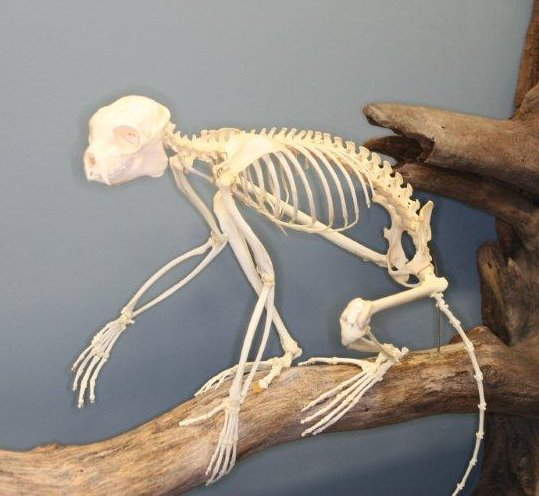
Sifaka skeleton

Predators of the sifaka include the fossa, a puma-like mammal native to Madagascar, and aerial hunters such as hawks. The sifaka usually avoids these attacks with its agile acrobatics through the trees high above the ground. However, they have been known to attack by biting and scratching and have even been witnessed fighting off a Madagascar ground boa.

A four- to five-month gestation period ends with the birth of a single offspring in July. The young holds fast to the mother's belly when small, but then later is carried on her back. Young are weaned after about six months and reach full maturity at the age of two to three years. The life expectancy of the sifakas is up to 20 years.

== Threats ==
Conservative estimates show that the utilization of fire for slash and burn cultivation, cattle raising, logging, and mining activities has contributed to the loss of 52% of the forested land since the 1950s, impacting the survival of sifakas. For instance, Perrier's sifaka relies solely on vast forest cover, so little to no institutions are addressing these threats or the species' conservation status.

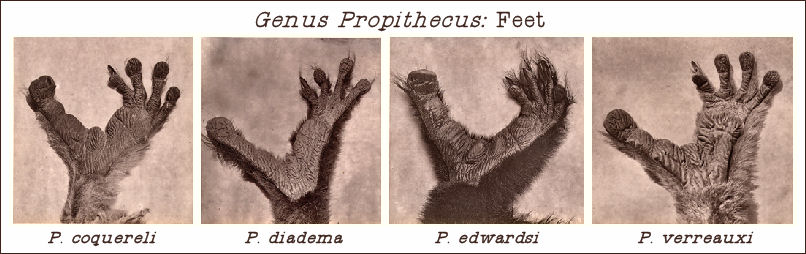

Sifakas hop side-to-side when moving on the ground.

== Classification ==
Propithecus distribution

Range of the verreauxi group: red = P. verreauxi, green = P. coquereli,
purple = P. deckenii, orange = P. coronatus,
blue = P. tattersalli

Range of the diadema group: red = P. perrieri, green = P. candidus,
purple = P. diadema, orange = P. edwardsi

- Family Indriidae
  - Genus Indri
  - Genus Avahi
  - Genus Propithecus
    - P. diadema group
      - Diademed sifaka, P. diadema
      - Milne-Edwards's sifaka, P. edwardsi
      - Silky sifaka, P. candidus
      - Perrier's sifaka, P. perrieri
    - P. verreauxi group
      - Coquerel's sifaka, P. coquereli
      - Verreaux's sifaka, P. verreauxi
      - Von der Decken's sifaka, P. deckenii
      - Crowned sifaka, P. coronatus
      - Golden-crowned sifaka, P. tattersalli
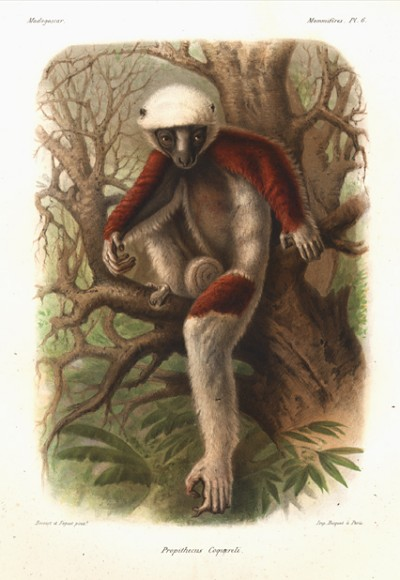
P. coquereli

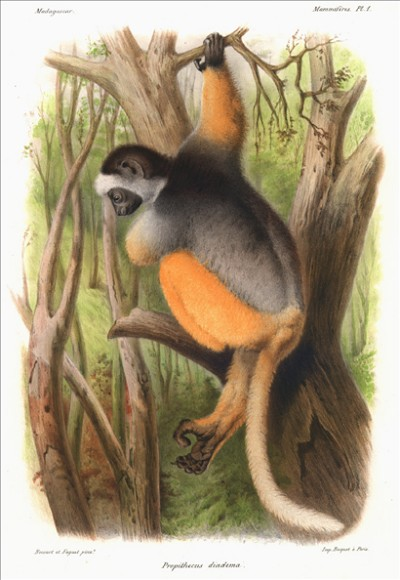
P. diadema

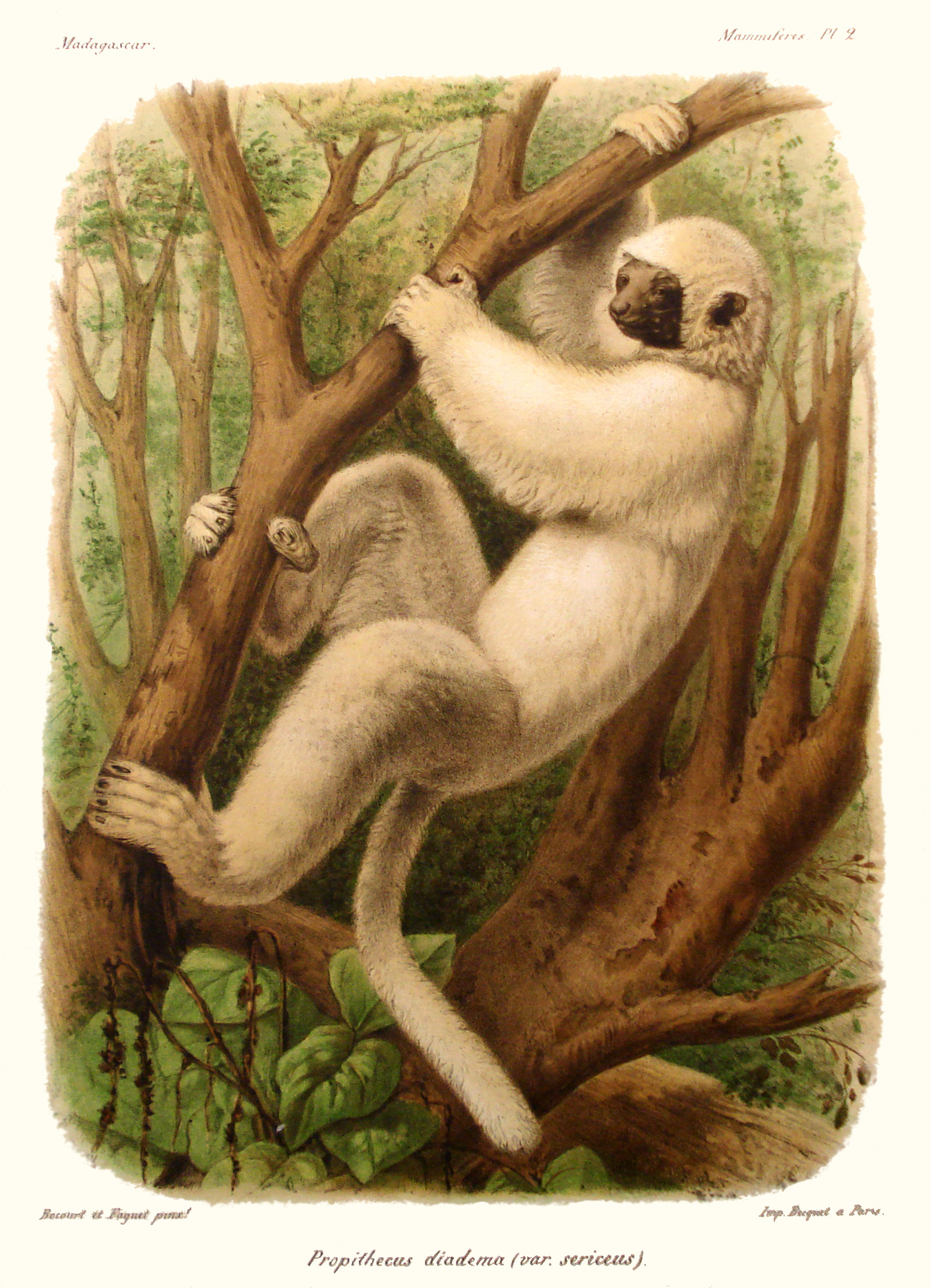
P. candidus

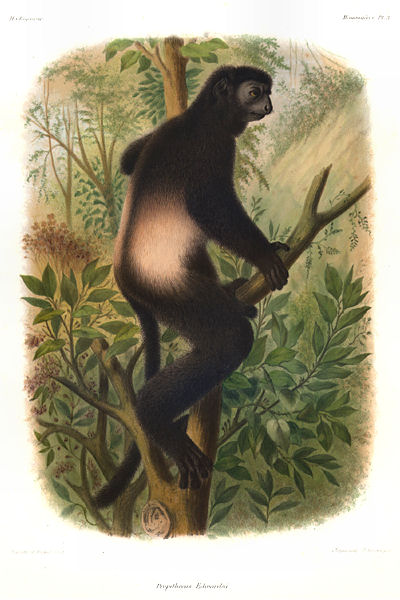
P. edwardsi
