= Besalampy =

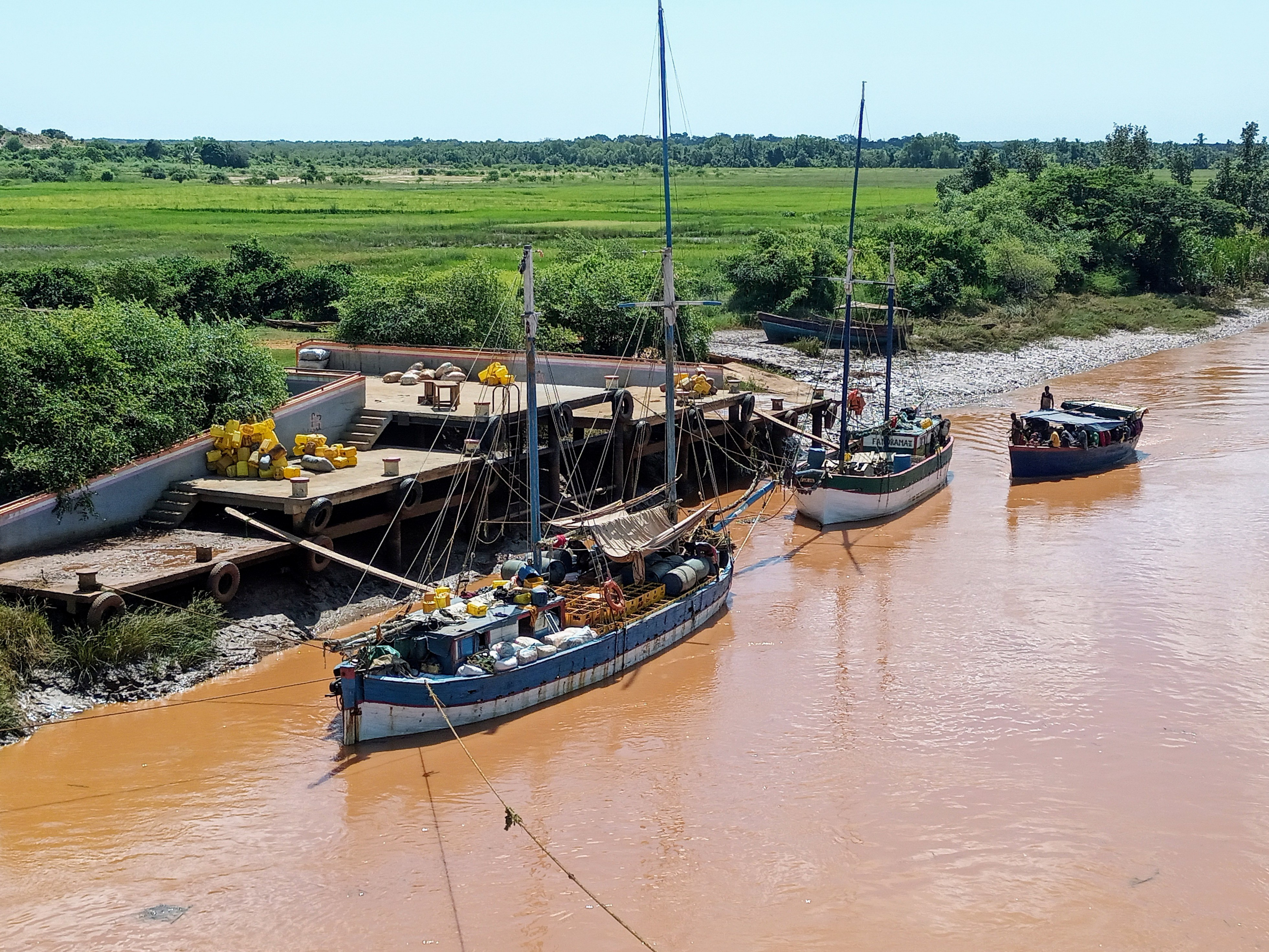
- Harbour of Besalampy

- Location in Madagascar
- Coordinates: 16°45′S 44°29′E
- Country: Madagascar
- Region: Melaky
- District: Besalampy
- Elevation: 30 m (98 ft)

Population (2018)Census
  - Total: 11,331
- Time zone: UTC3 (EAT)
- Postal code: 410

Besalampy is a rural municipality on the west coast of Madagascar. It belongs to the district of Besalampy, which is a part of Melaky Region. The population of the municipality was 11331 in 2018.

Besalampy is served by a local Besalampy Airport and maritime harbour. In addition to primary schooling the town offers secondary education at both junior and senior levels. The town has a permanent court and hospital.

The majority 65% of the population of the municipality are farmers, while an additional 30% receives their livelihood from raising livestock. Most important export product is raffia palms. Other important crops are bananas, seeds of catechu and oranges. Additionally fishing employs 5% of the population. There is also a prawn farm in Besalampy.

== History ==
In 2008 the municipality was destroyed by 95% by the Cyclone Fame

== River ==
The Maningoza river has its mouth near Besalampy.

== Roads ==
Bemarivo is crossed by the unpaved National road 19T.

== Climate ==
Climate data for Besalampy (1991–2020)
Month	Jan	Feb	Mar	Apr	May	Jun	Jul	Aug	Sep	Oct	Nov	Dec	Year
Record high °C (°F)	35.3 (95.5)	35.4 (95.7)	36.2 (97.2)	35.8 (96.4)	35.5 (95.9)	33.9 (93.0)	33.7 (92.7)	35.6 (96.1)	36.0 (96.8)	37.5 (99.5)	38.7 (101.7)	37.0 (98.6)	38.7 (101.7)
Mean daily maximum °C (°F)	30.3 (86.5)	30.5 (86.9)	31.3 (88.3)	31.5 (88.7)	30.7 (87.3)	29.7 (85.5)	29.1 (84.4)	29.7 (85.5)	30.8 (87.4)	31.5 (88.7)	31.8 (89.2)	31.3 (88.3)	30.7 (87.3)
Daily mean °C (°F)	27.4 (81.3)	27.4 (81.3)	27.9 (82.2)	27.7 (81.9)	26.4 (79.5)	24.9 (76.8)	24.3 (75.7)	24.9 (76.8)	26.1 (79.0)	27.2 (81.0)	28.0 (82.4)	27.9 (82.2)	26.7 (80.1)
Mean daily minimum °C (°F)	24.4 (75.9)	24.3 (75.7)	24.4 (75.9)	23.8 (74.8)	22.0 (71.6)	20.1 (68.2)	19.4 (66.9)	20.0 (68.0)	21.3 (70.3)	23.0 (73.4)	24.1 (75.4)	24.6 (76.3)	22.6 (72.7)
Record low °C (°F)	21.0 (69.8)	20.4 (68.7)	19.4 (66.9)	17.3 (63.1)	14.4 (57.9)	13.6 (56.5)	12.9 (55.2)	13.7 (56.7)	14.1 (57.4)	16.5 (61.7)	19.0 (66.2)	20.2 (68.4)	12.9 (55.2)
Average precipitation mm (inches)	445.4 (17.54)	319.9 (12.59)	162.1 (6.38)	33.2 (1.31)	4.2 (0.17)	4.5 (0.18)	0.4 (0.02)	2.7 (0.11)	3.3 (0.13)	10.9 (0.43)	51.6 (2.03)	186.1 (7.33)	1,224.3 (48.20)
Average precipitation days (≥ 1.0 mm)	17.3	14.9	11.5	3.4	0.4	0.3	0.1	0.4	0.7	1.1	4.5	10.5	65.1
Source: NOAA

== See also ==
- Bemarivo Reserve at 12 km from Besalampy.
- the Maningoza Reserve is located in the district of Besalampy.
- Melaky
