= Maningoza =

Maningoza Manangoza

Location
- Country: Madagascar
- Region: Melaky
- Municipality: ]

Physical characteristics
- Mouth: Indian Ocean
  - location: north of Besalampy,
  - coordinates: 16°38′00″S 44°28′00″E
  - elevation: 0 m (0 ft)
- Length: 86 km (53 mi)

Basin features
- Tributaries
  - right: Sambao river

The Maningoza is a river in western Madagascar. It crosses the Maningoza Reserve and has its mouth into the Indian Ocean near Besalampy.

There are crocodiles in the Maningoza river.
