= Bemarivo Special Reserve =

Nature reserve in Madagascar

- IUCN category IV (habitat/species management area)
- Location within Madagascar
- Location: Melaky, Madagascar
- Nearest city: Besalampy
- Coordinates: 16°56′S 44°23′E
- Area: 120.46 km^{2} (46.51 sq mi)
- Established: 10 September 1956
- Governing body: Madagascar National Parks Association (PNM-ANGAP)

Bemarivo Reserve is a wildlife reserve 12 km from Besalampy in the region of Melaky in the north-west of Madagascar. It was created in 1956 and covers an area of 12,080 hectares (29,900 acres). The reserve is known for its fauna especially endemic birds.

== Geography ==
The reserve is located on a coastal plateau in the region of Melaky, about 12 km (7 mi) from the town and commune of Besalampy, and 5 km (3 mi) from the Mozambique Channel coast. It has a warm climate with an average daily temperature of 25 °C (77 °F) and the rainy season is from November to February with an annual rainfall of approximately 1,000 mm (39 in). The Bemarivo River is a tributary of the Sofia River and flows permanently during the dry season unlike the small tributaries of the Marotondro and Ampandra Rivers which are seasonal. The main vegetation is dense, dry deciduous forest, dominated by trees of Cordyla, Dalbergia, Diospyros, Eugenia, Grewia, Cryptocarya agathophylla and Sideroxylon species. Outside the forest, there is secondary savanna with Bismarckia palms, and Tsimanjonotsy and Ranovoribe lakes and marshes. The Sakalava are the dominant ethnic group.

== Flora and fauna ==
The reserve has an impressive number of endemic birds with over twenty-three recorded. Altogether there are seventy-three species of birds, twenty species of reptiles and fifteen species of mammals (including six species of lemurs) are known in this reserve, as well as twenty-four species of reptiles and 194 species of plants. The wetlands are the biggest attraction for birds which include the Madagascar fish eagle (Haliaeetus vociferoides) which is critically endangered and Bernier's teal (Anas bernieri) which is listed as endangered by the International Union for Conservation of Nature (IUCN). Reptiles found in the reserve include the Nile crocodile (Crocodylus niloticus) and the Madagascar Ground Boa (Acrantophis madagascariensis).

Slash-and-burn agriculture is the main threat in the reserve along with fires.

== See also ==
- List of national parks of Madagascar
