= Besalampy Airport =

Airport in Madagascar

- IATA: BPY; ICAO: FMNQ

Summary
- Airport type: Public
- Operator: Government
- Serves: Besalampy
- Location: Melaky, Madagascar
- Elevation AMSL: 125 ft / 38 m
- Coordinates: 16°44′30″S 44°28′53″E

Map
- Location within Madagascar

Runways
Direction	Length		Surface
Direction	ft	m	Surface
08/26	3,523	1,074	Asphalt

Besalampy Airport (IATA: BPY, ICAO: FMNQ) is an airport in Besalampy, Madagascar.
