= 2007–08 South-West Indian Ocean cyclone season =

Cyclone season in the Southwest Indian Ocean

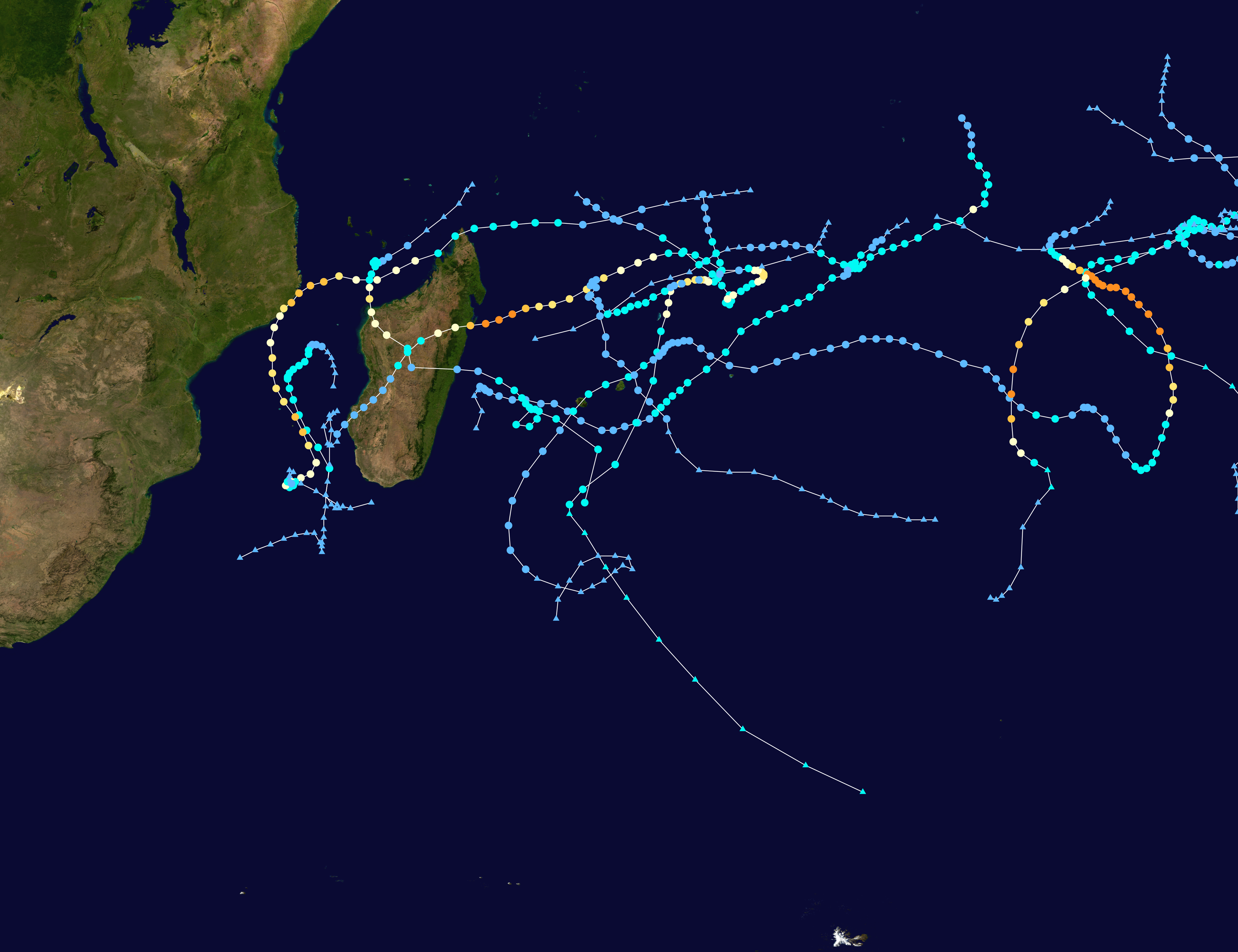
- Season summary map

Seasonal boundaries
- First system formed: October 12, 2007
- Last system dissipated: March 27, 2008

Strongest storm
- Name: Hondo
  - Maximum winds: 215 km/h (130 mph) (10-minute sustained)
  - Lowest pressure: 915 hPa (mbar)

Seasonal statistics
- Total disturbances: 15
- Total depressions: 13
- Total storms: 13
- Tropical cyclones: 6
- Intense tropical cyclones: 4
- Total fatalities: 123
- Total damage: ~ $38.1 million (2008 USD)

Related articles
- 2007–08 Australian region cyclone season; 2007–08 South Pacific cyclone season

The 2007–08 South-West Indian Ocean cyclone season was the third most active tropical cyclone season, along with the 1985–86 season and behind the 1993–94 season and the 2018–19 season, with twelve named tropical cyclones developing in the region. It began on November 15, 2007, and ended on April 30, 2008, with the exception for Mauritius and the Seychelles, which ended May 15. These dates conventionally delimit the period of each year when most tropical cyclones form in the basin, which is west of 90°E and south of the Equator. Tropical cyclones in this basin are monitored by the Regional Specialised Meteorological Centre in Réunion.

== Systems ==
=== Tropical Cyclone 01U ===
- Moderate tropical storm (MFR)
- Tropical depression (SSHWS)
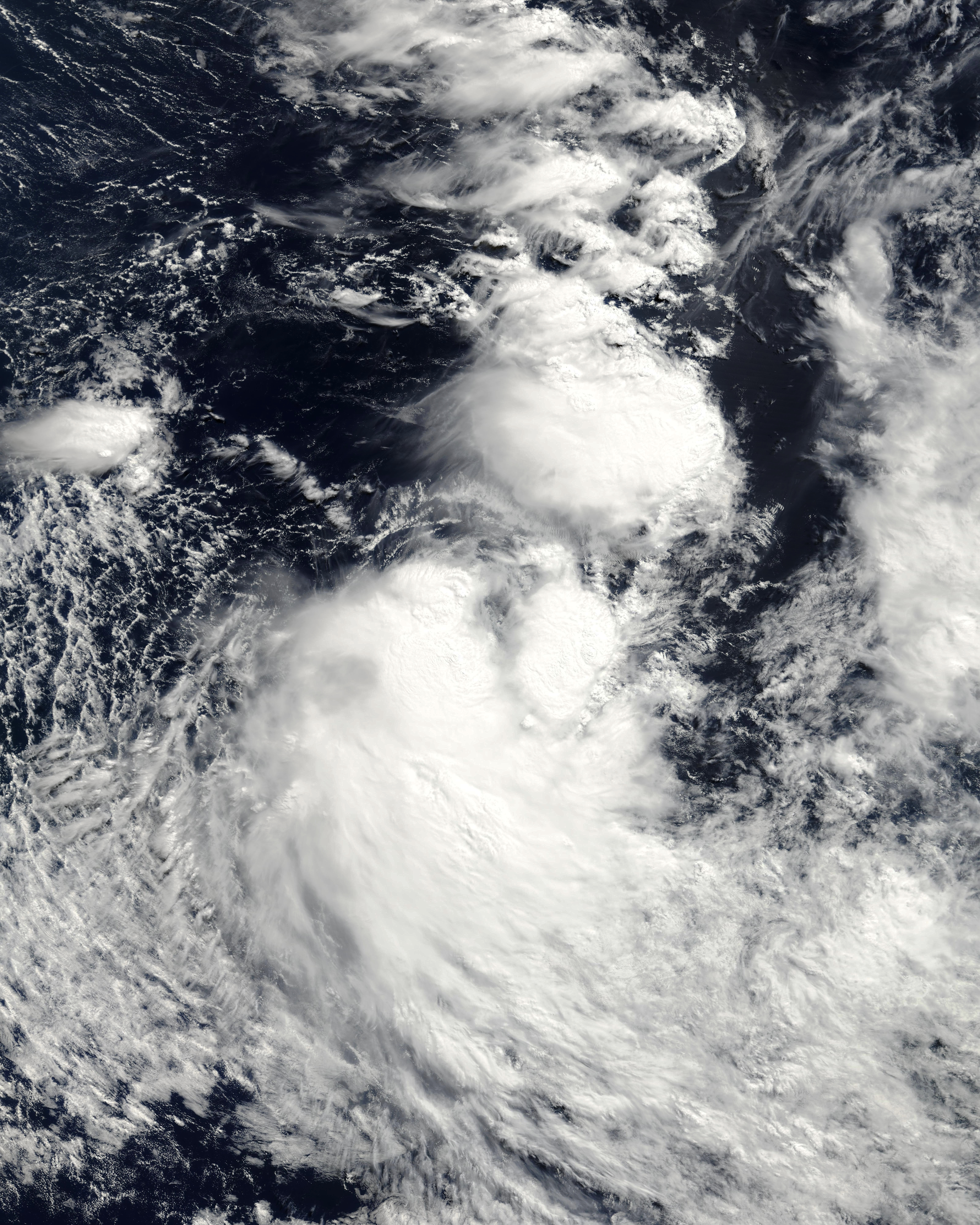
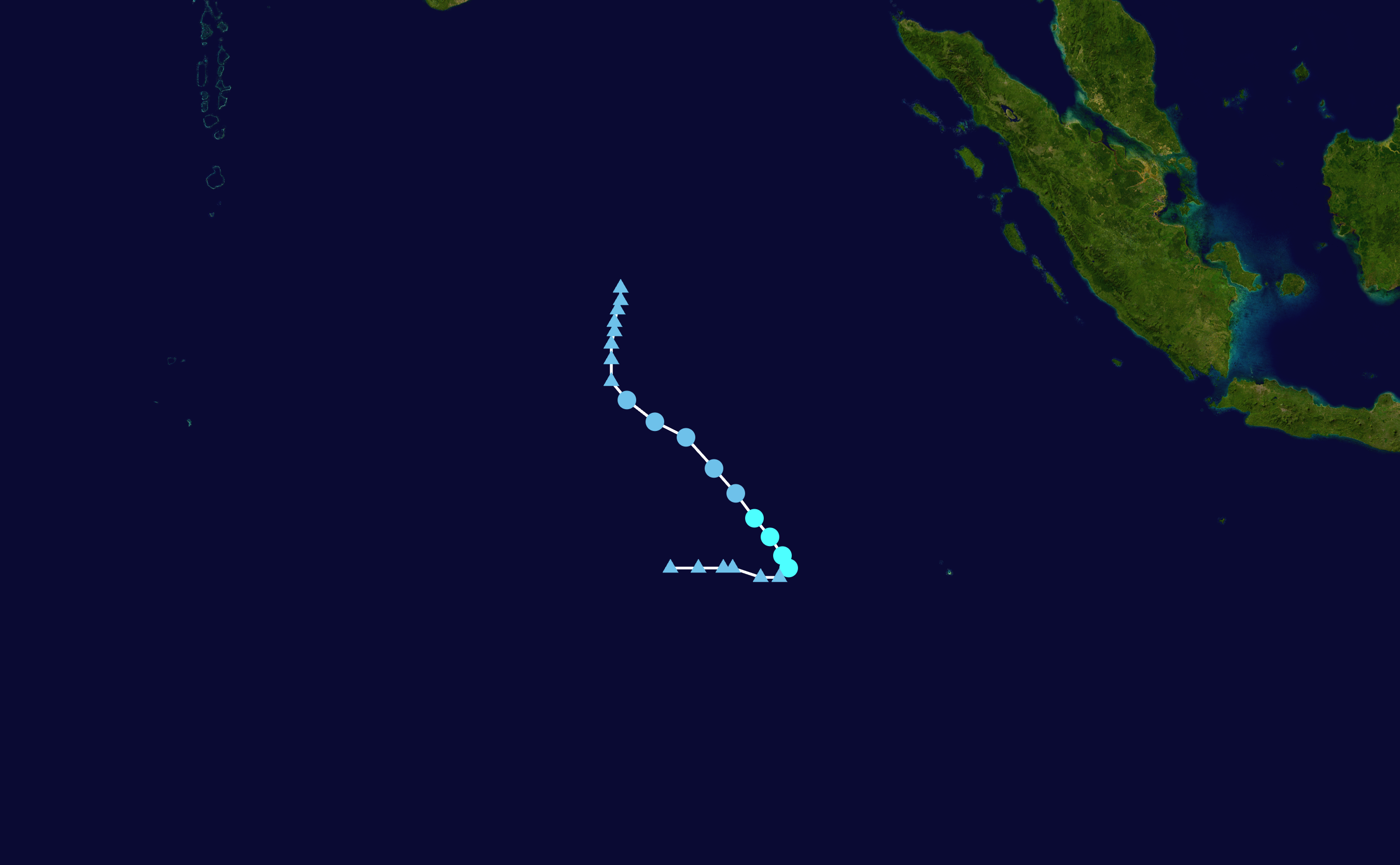
- Duration: July 26 – July 29 (exited basin)
- Peak intensity: 75 km/h (45 mph) (10-min); 992 hPa (mbar)

On July 26, a tropical disturbance developed within a near-equatorial trough. The next day, convection began to develop around the low while located about 1,500 kilometres (930 mi) east of Diego Garcia. Moderate wind shear temporarily caused the convection to become displaced from the center on July 27. However, later that day, the Joint Typhoon Warning Center (JTWC) assessed the chances of the low developing into a tropical cyclone as "fair". By July 29 the low was designated as Tropical Disturbance 01 while located near the edge of Météo-France's area of responsibility. With developing banding features, increasing convection and very warm sea-surface temperatures (exceeding 28 °C; 82 °F), the JTWC issued a Tropical Cyclone Formation Alert (TCFA) for the low as they assessed the chances of development of a tropical cyclone within 48 hours as "good".

In the post-storm report issued by the Australian Bureau of Meteorology, the system was estimated to have become a Category 1 cyclone, with winds peaking at 75 km/h (45 mph), shortly before leaving Météo-France's area of responsibility early on July 29. After leaving Météo-France's area of responsibility, the JTWC designated the storm as Tropical Cyclone 01S. In Météo-France's post-storm analysis, the disturbance was declassified as a tropical cyclone and the numbering, 01, was removed for unknown reasons.

=== Tropical Disturbance 01 ===
- Tropical disturbance (MFR)
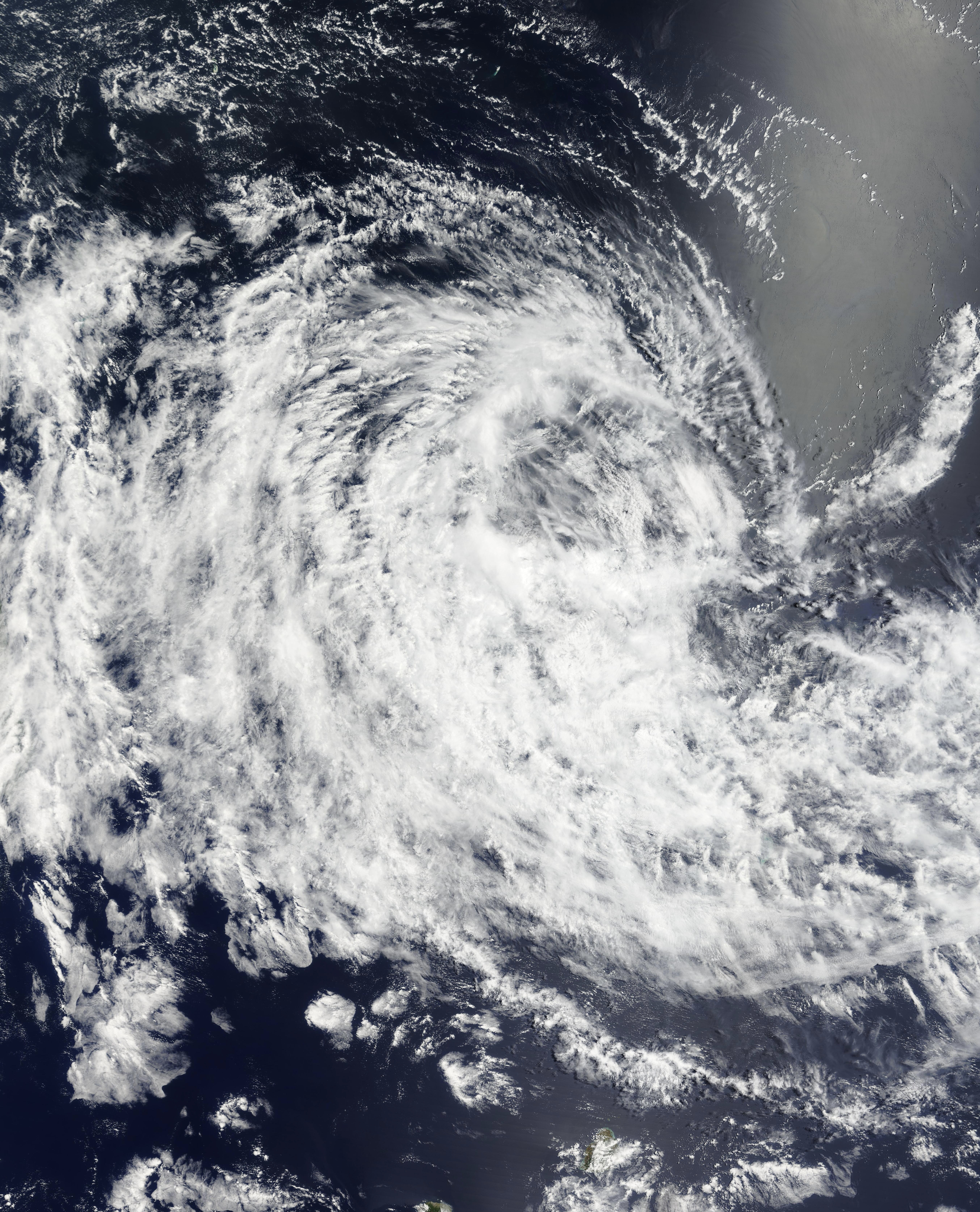
- Duration: October 12 – October 13
- Peak intensity: 45 km/h (30 mph) (10-min); 1005 hPa (mbar)

The first officially recognized tropical disturbance developed early on October 10. The disturbance featured persistent convection around an elongated low level circulation located about 600 kilometres (370 mi) west-northwest of Diego Garcia. With marginally favorable. conditions for further development, the JTWC assessed the chances of the low developing into a tropical cyclone as "poor". Further development took place later that day, with banding features developing and deepening convection as it traveled towards the south-southwest. In response to the increased development, the JTWC increased the chances of a tropical cyclone developing to "fair". On October 12, Météo-France designated the system as Tropical Disturbance 01–20072008. However, little or no further development was expected.

Late on October 12 through early on October 13, Dvorak Technique intensity estimates for the low from the JTWC reached T2.5—the equivalent of a minimal tropical storm—and there was a possibility that the system was briefly a tropical storm by one-minute standards. Despite favorable upper-level conditions and low wind shear, the disturbance was situated over cool sea-surface temperatures which provided little energy to fuel convective activity. With little thunderstorm and shower activity development, Météo-France issued their final advisory on the dissipating low the next day. Since the disturbance never impacted land, there were no reports of damage or injuries from it.

=== Severe Tropical Storm Lee–Ariel ===
- Severe tropical storm (MFR)
- Tropical storm (SSHWS)
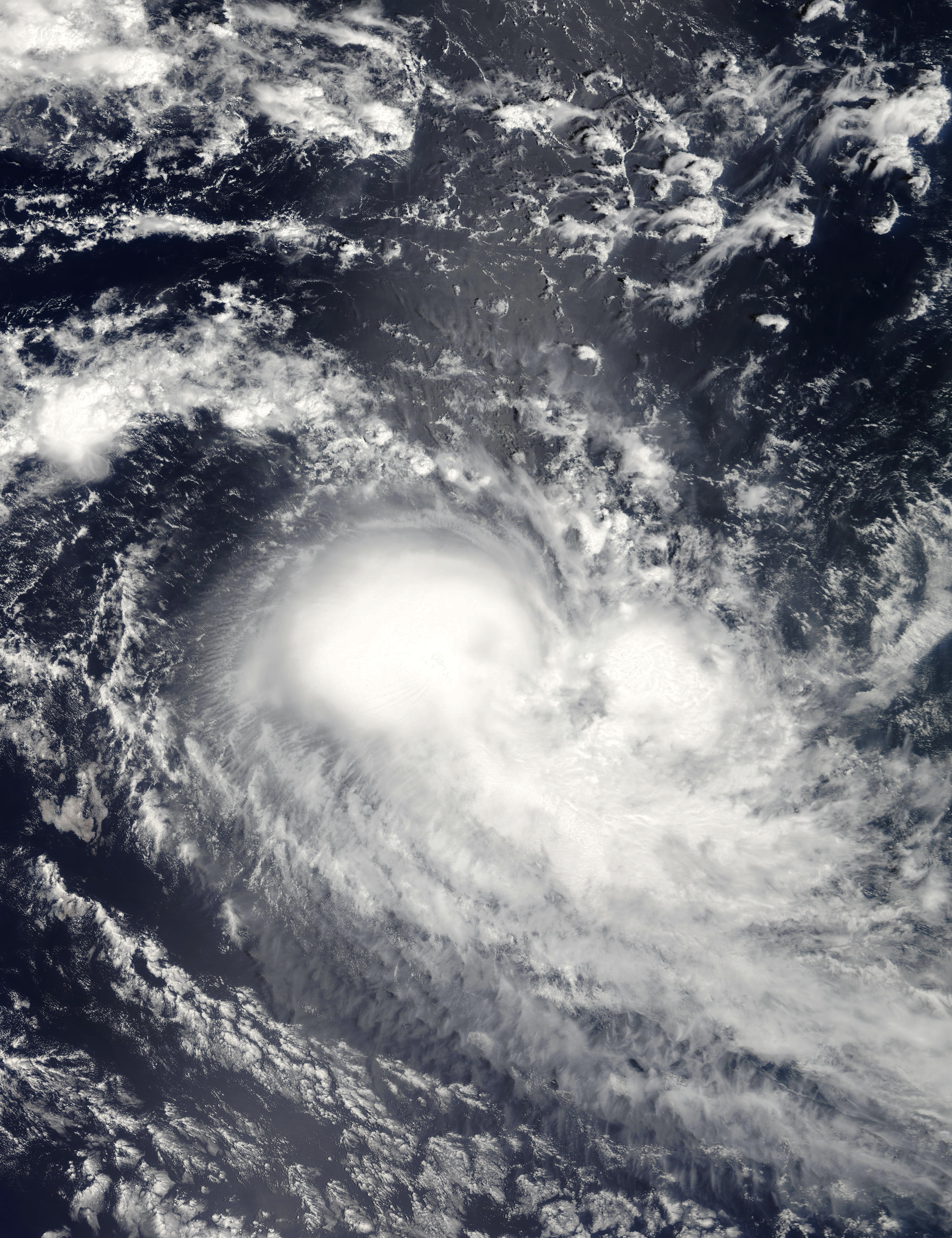
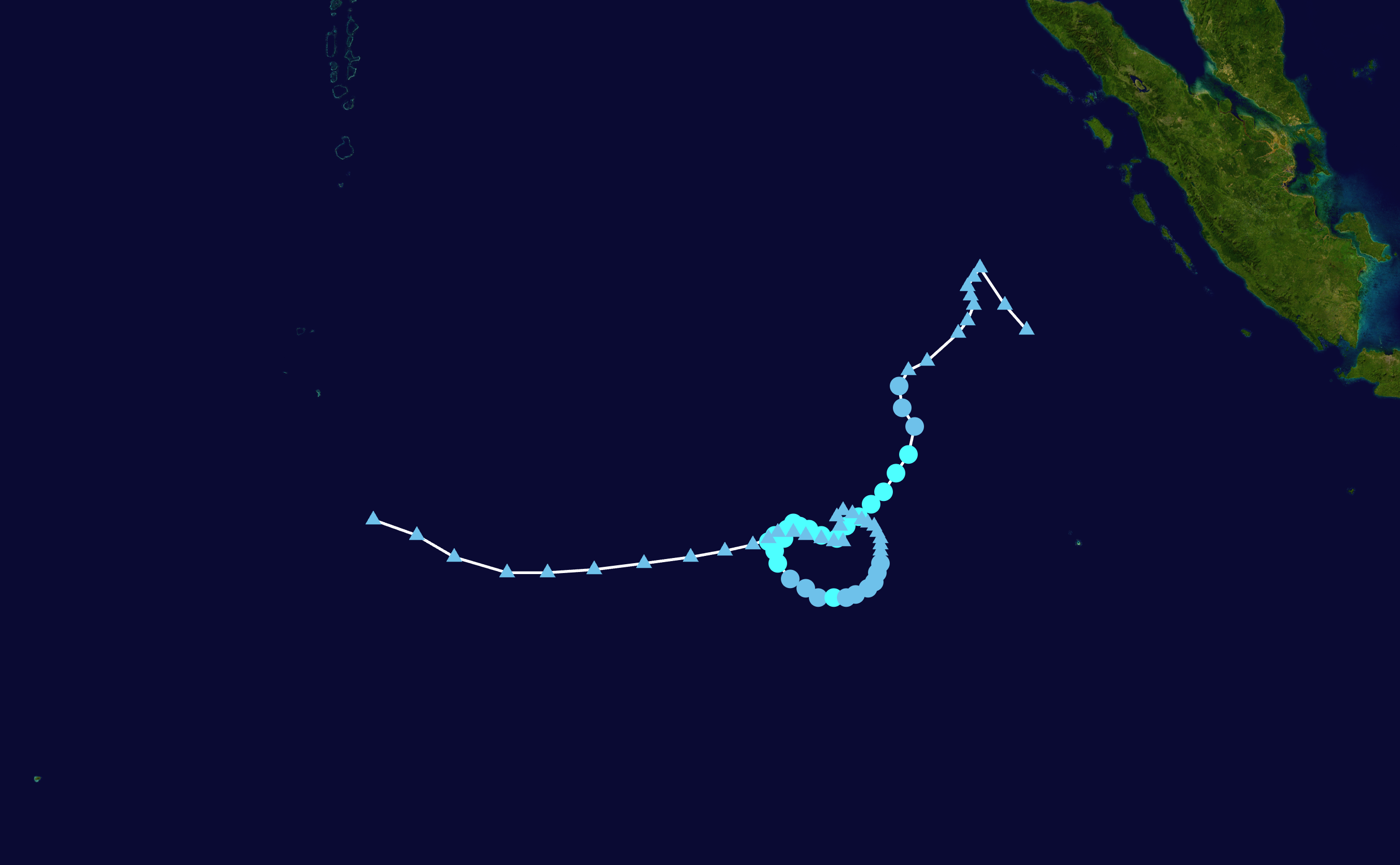
- Duration: November 15 (Entered basin) – November 28
- Peak intensity: 95 km/h (60 mph) (10-min); 985 hPa (mbar)

On November 13, the Australian Bureau of Meteorology (BoM) began monitoring a tropical low situated about 835 km (519 mi) northwest of the Keeling Islands. The next day, the low was upgraded to a Category 1 cyclone and given the name Lee. Shortly after being named, the JTWC issued a TCFA as deep convection persisted around the center of circulation. The system was moving towards the southwest within an area of moderate wind shear. Several hours later, the JTWC designated Lee as Tropical Cyclone 03S. With continued development, Lee strengthened into a Category 2 cyclone, according to the BoM, with winds of 95 km/h (59 mph) 10-minute winds). At 1200 UTC, Lee crossed into Météo-France's area of responsibility at peak intensity. Upon entering their AoR, it was given a second name, Ariel, and designated as a severe tropical storm.

Roughly six hours later, the JTWC assessed Lee–Ariel to have reached its peak intensity with winds of 110 km/h (68 mph) 1-minute sustained), based on the development of an eye-like structure. The next day, foreword motion slowed significantly due to a subtropical ridge located to the north of the storm. This ridge also caused the storm to turn towards the west, keeping a slow pace. Strong wind shear began to impact the system later that day, causing it to weaken into a moderate tropical storm. Despite the strong shear, most forecast models showed the storm re-intensifying several days out in an area of lower shear. Most of the deep convection was torn away from the system, with little remaining around the center of circulation.

The storm weakened to a tropical depression around 0600 UTC on November 17 as convection continued to dissipate. Despite moving into an area favorable for intensification, Météo-France issued their final advisory on ex-Lee–Ariel on November 18 as it continued to weaken. The remnants of the system persisted for another ten days, completing an erratic counter-clockwise loop before taking a general westward direction.

=== Severe Tropical Storm Bongwe ===
- Severe tropical storm (MFR)
- Category 1 tropical cyclone (SSHWS)
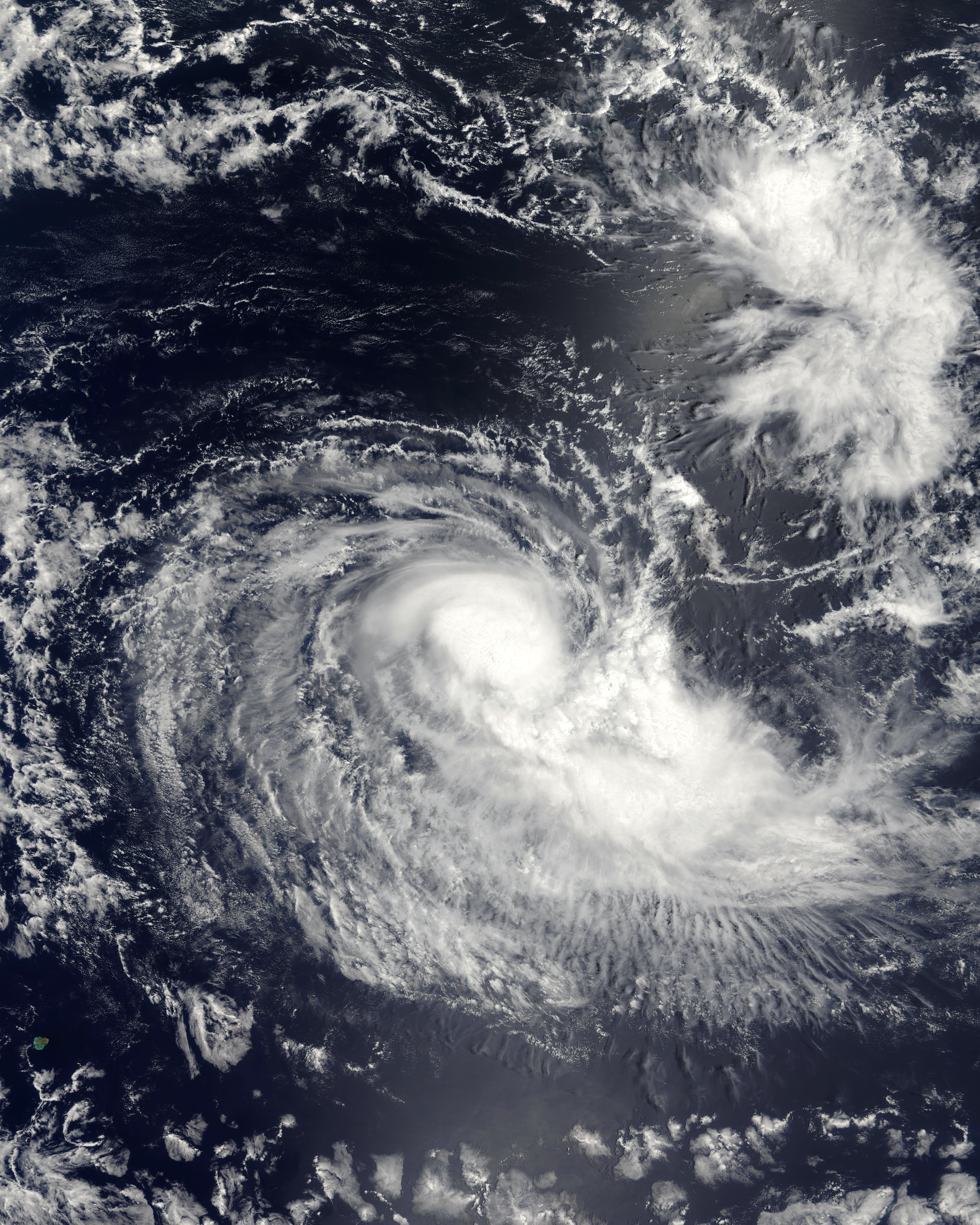
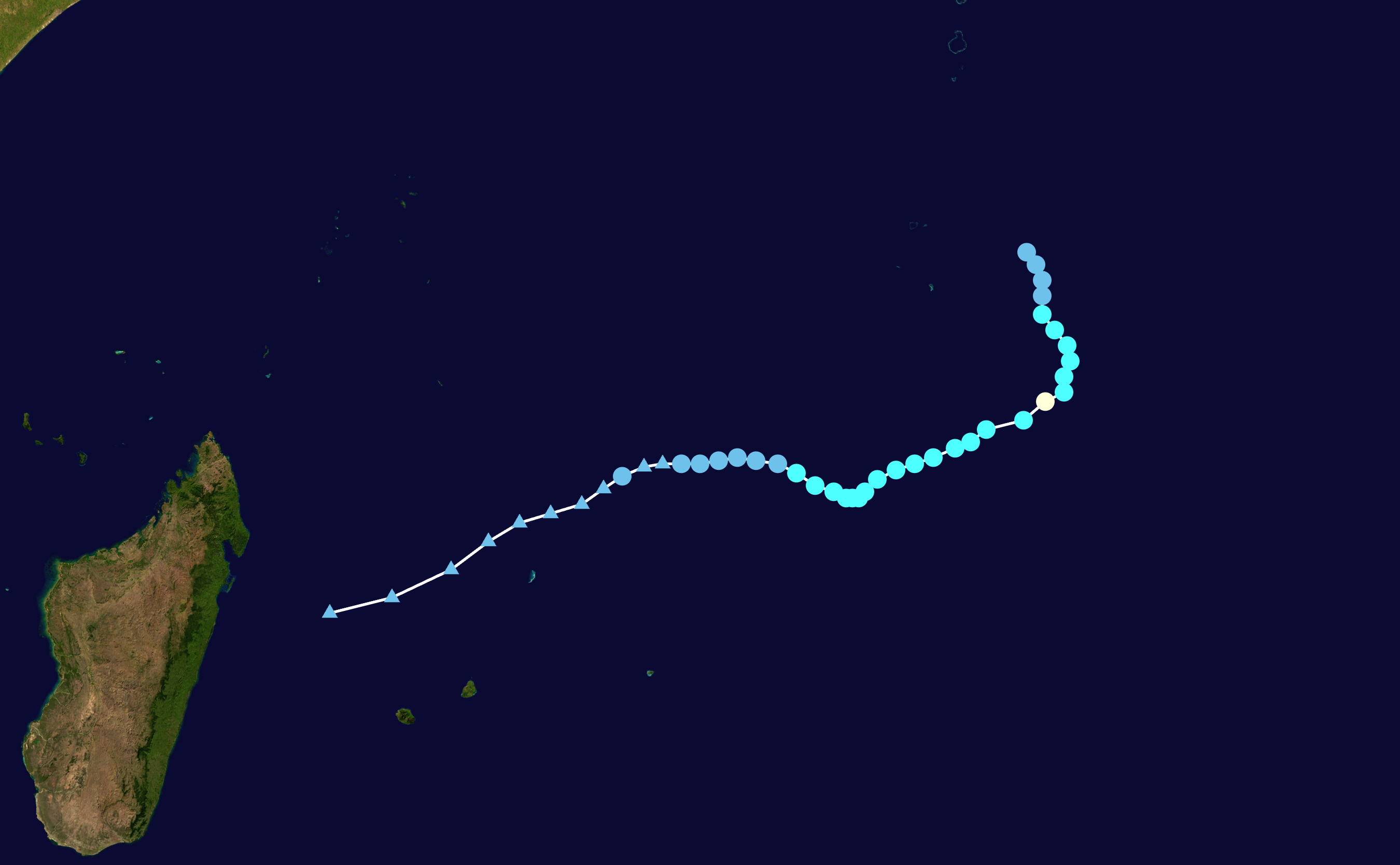
- Duration: November 17 – November 28
- Peak intensity: 105 km/h (65 mph) (10-min); 976 hPa (mbar)

An area of disturbed weather developed east of Diego Garcia on November 15. The system slowly organised as it moved southeastward and began interacting with Severe Tropical Storm Ariel, and the JTWC issued a TCFA on November 17. The JTWC upgraded the system to Tropical Cyclone 04S early the next day. Also on November 18, RSMC La Réunion classified the system as Tropical Disturbance 03. Later that day, RSMC La Réunion upgraded it to Tropical Depression 03. It was upgraded to Moderate Tropical Storm Bongwe on November 19 and a Severe Tropical Storm later that day. Increased wind shear early on November 20 slowed the intensification trend, and weakened it to a moderate tropical storm. However, it restrengthened to a severe tropical storm on November 22. The restrengthening trend was short-lived, however, as the storm weakened once again on November 23, down to a depression and then a disturbance, until it finally dissipated on November 24.

=== Moderate Tropical Storm Celina ===
- Moderate tropical storm (MFR)
- Tropical storm (SSHWS)
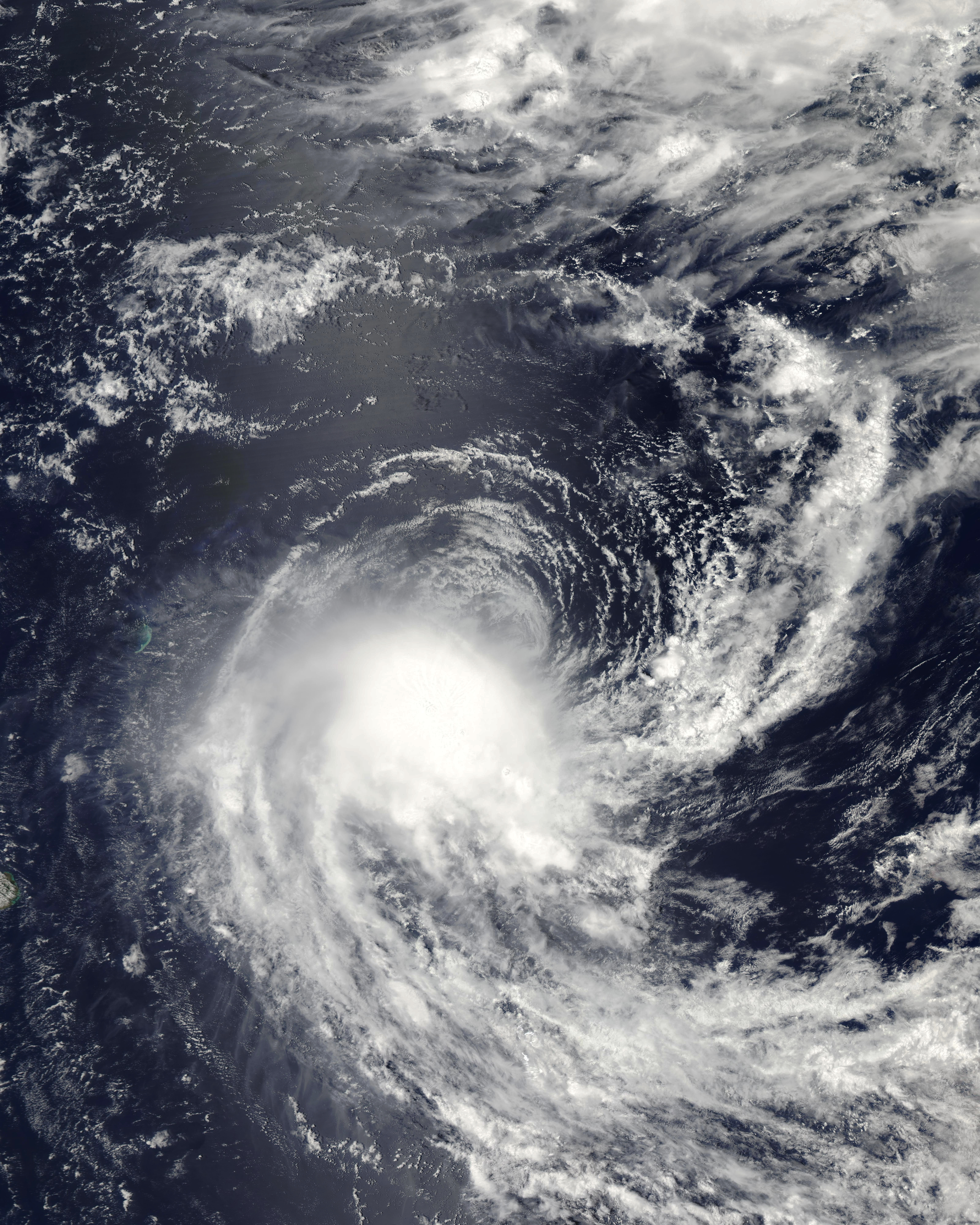
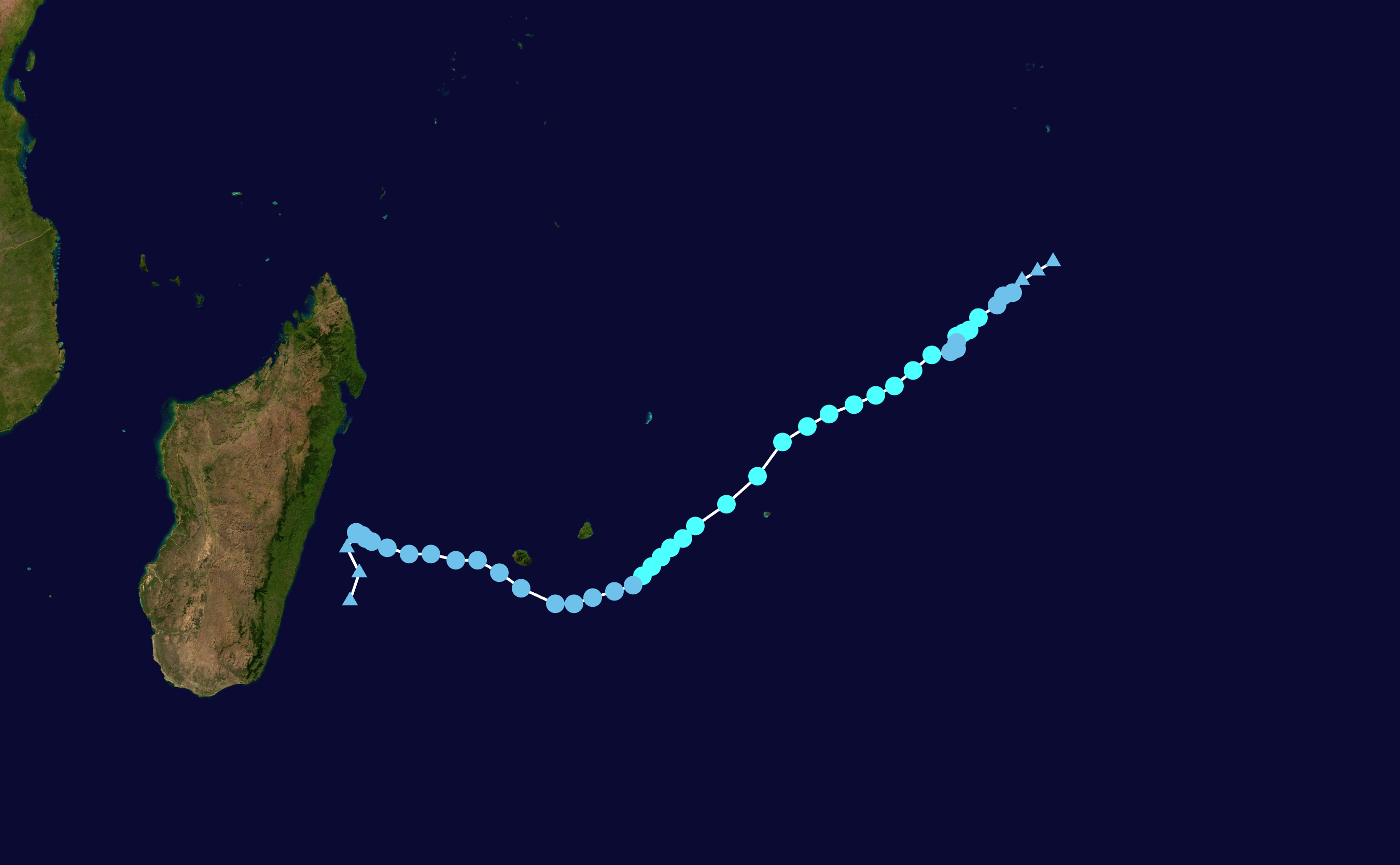
- Duration: December 11 – December 23
- Peak intensity: 75 km/h (45 mph) (10-min); 992 hPa (mbar)

An area of disturbed weather developed early on the December 12 north-northeast of Rodrigues. Later that day it was designated as Tropical Disturbance 04R. The JTWC then issued a TCFA on the developing system late on December 12. The JTWC issued its first warning on December 13, designating the storm as Tropical Cyclone 06S. Although the low level circulation center was exposed the system was upgraded to a tropical depression by Météo-France on December 14 due to a better low level circulation. Early on December 17 Mauritius Meteorological Service upgraded the system to a moderate tropical storm and named it "Celina" as it approaches Mauritius Island.

Weakening took place on December 18, and the JTWC issued its final advisory early that day. Météo-France maintained the system as a tropical depression. Météo-France issued its final advisory on December 21 as it began to dissipate just east of southeastern Madagascar.

On December 20, the remnant low of Celina passed about 60 km (37 mi) southwest of Reunion, producing heavy rains over the island. Some areas received 114 millimetres (4.5 in) of rain in the span of three hours, with the highest total amounting to 374 mm (14.7 in) in La Plaine des Chicots. These rains led to the death of one woman after she drowned in her car which was overcome by floodwaters in a ravine. Wind gusts were recorded up to 130 km/h (80 mph).

=== Moderate Tropical Storm Dama ===
- Moderate tropical storm (MFR)
- Tropical storm (SSHWS)
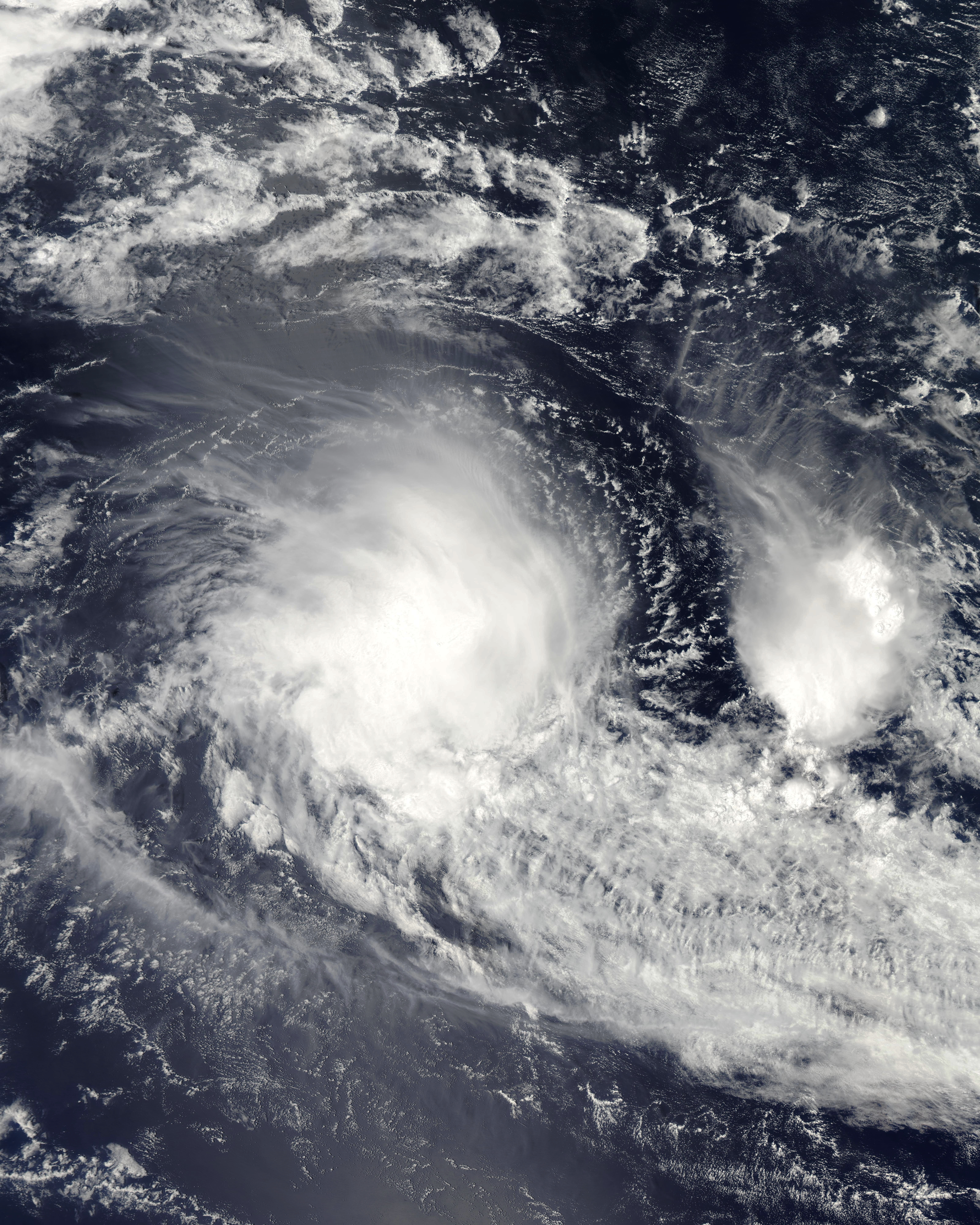
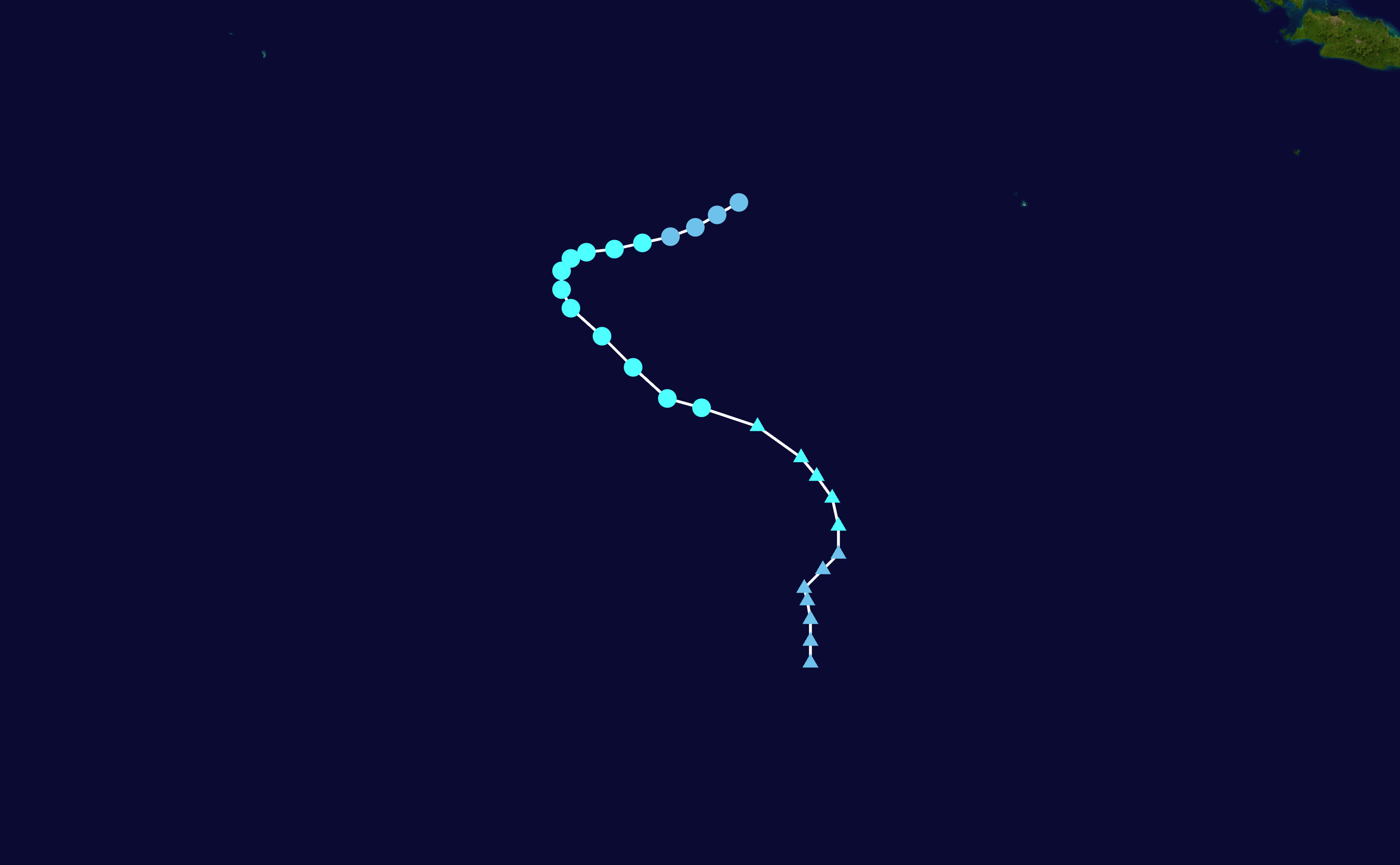
- Duration: December 17 – December 21
- Peak intensity: 65 km/h (40 mph) (10-min); 995 hPa (mbar)

An area of disturbed weather begin developing east of 90°E near Cocos Island, eventually crossing into the southwestern Indian Ocean early on December 17. The JTWC issued a TCFA early December 18. RSMC Réunion designated the system a tropical disturbance early in the afternoon as the convection begin to deepen and isolate itself from the disturbance to its northwest. The Joint Typhoon Warning Center designated the tropical disturbance as Tropical Cyclone 07S. The weak vertical wind shear allowed the system to deepen into a tropical depression in the early evening of December 18. The system temporarily reached moderate tropical storm intensity on December 19 but persistent vertical wind shear caused it to rapidly weaken back into a tropical depression. However, the next day, decreasing wind shear allowed convection to form closer to the center for 05R to reclassify as a moderate tropical storm status and earned the name "Dama." The Joint Typhoon Warning Center and Météo-France issued its final advisory on December 21 as it transitioned to an extratropical system.

=== Moderate Tropical Storm Elnus ===
- Moderate tropical storm (MFR)
- Tropical storm (SSHWS)
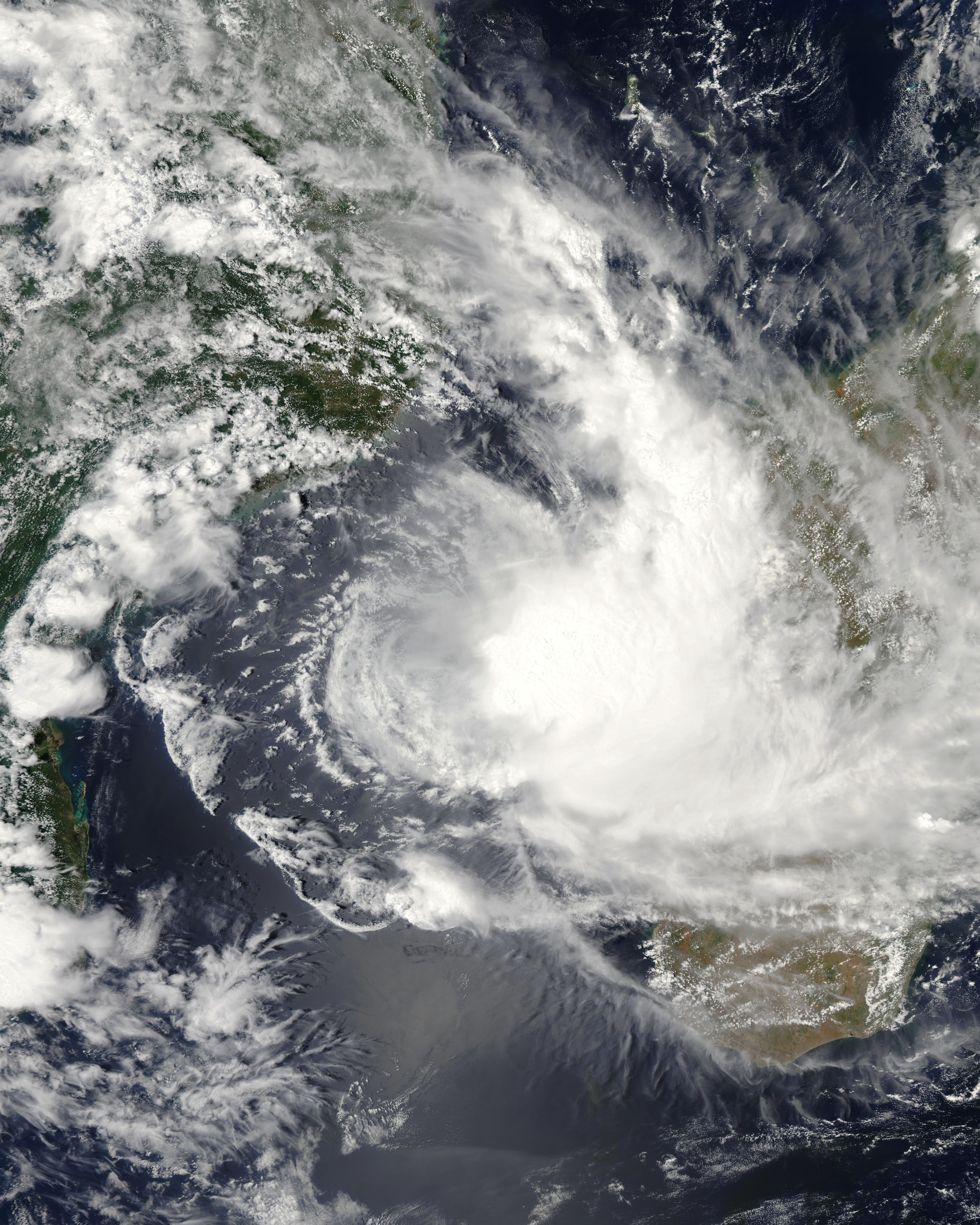
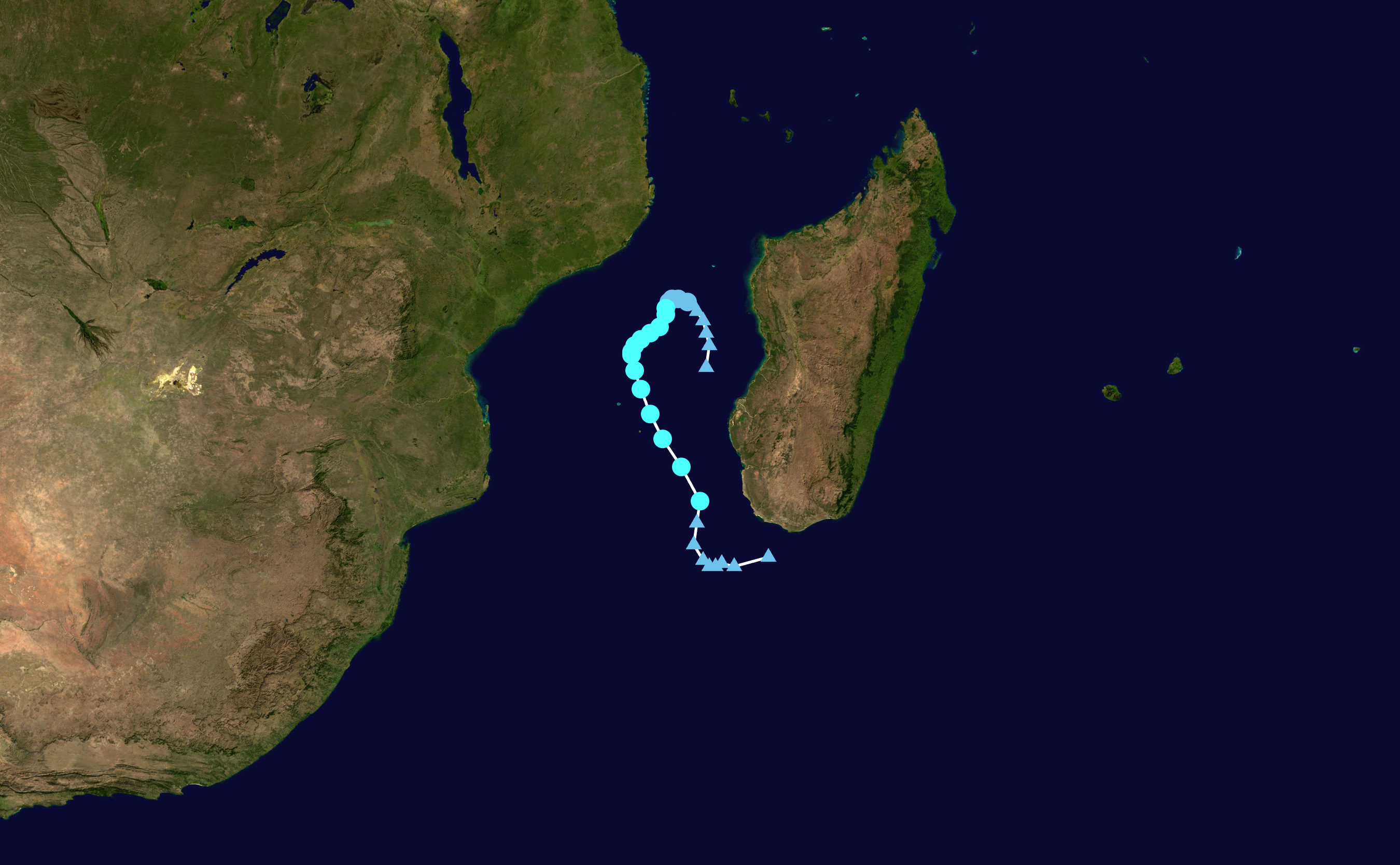
- Duration: December 29 – January 3
- Peak intensity: 65 km/h (40 mph) (10-min); 995 hPa (mbar)

Early on December 30 an area of disturbed weather formed west of Madagascar and was designated as 06R. Later that day it was upgraded to Tropical Disturbance 06R, whilst the JTWC issued a TCFA on the developing system. On December 31, Météo-France upgraded the disturbance to tropical depression status. Soon after, the JTWC upgraded the system to Tropical Cyclone 09S. Early on January 1, the depression was upgraded to Moderate Tropical Storm Elnus, while located in the Mozambique Channel. On January 2, Météo-France downgraded the system to Tropical Depression ex-Elnus, and then to a tropical disturbance the next day. The JTWC issued its last advisory on January 4 as it transitioned to an extratropical system. Météo-France noted the storm was becoming extratropical on January 4, and on January 6 issued its final advisory on Extratropical Depression ex-Elnus as the system passed to the south of Madagascar.

On January 3, Elnus passed about 75 km (47 mi) east of Europa Island, producing winds up to 57 km/h (35 mph) along with a pressure of 997 hPa (mbar). The storm also enhanced rainfall, peaking around 150 millimetres (5.9 in), over parts of Malawi, causing minor flooding. Heavy rains in Madagascar briefly displaced 90 families in Antananarivo.

=== Tropical Disturbance 07 ===
- Tropical disturbance (MFR)
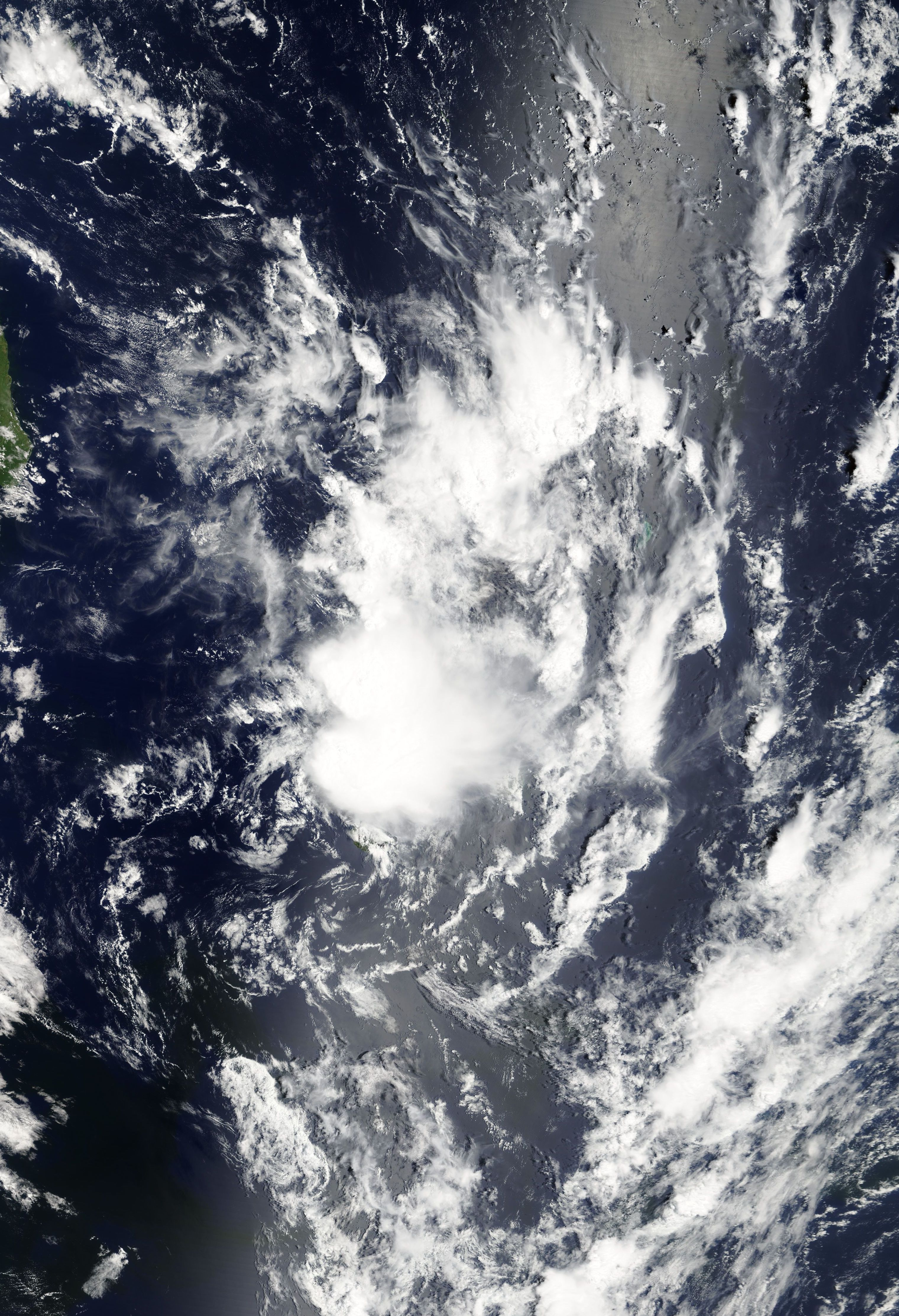
- Duration: January 6 – January 8
- Peak intensity: 35 km/h (25 mph) (10-min); 1003 hPa (mbar)

On January 6, the JTWC began monitoring an exposed low-level circulation located about 695 km (432 mi) north of Réunion traveling towards the south. Although moderate wind shear hampered significant development, deep convection developed towards the north of the low. Early the next day, the low was designated as Tropical Disturbance 07-20072008 by Météo-France. Later that day, despite weakening wind shear and increasing convection, the disturbance degenerated into a zone of disturbed weather. Although convection began to decrease by January 8, due to increasing wind shear, Météo-France redesigned the system as a tropical disturbance. At this time, the disturbance was assessed to have reached its peak intensity with winds of 35 km/h (20 mph) with a minimum pressure of 1003 hPa (mbar). Later that day, the low rapidly weakened and dissipated while located northwest of Réunion. Due to the proximity to Réunion, the disturbance produced numerous showers and thunderstorms for a few days.

=== Tropical Cyclone Fame ===
- Tropical cyclone (MFR)
- Category 2 tropical cyclone (SSHWS)
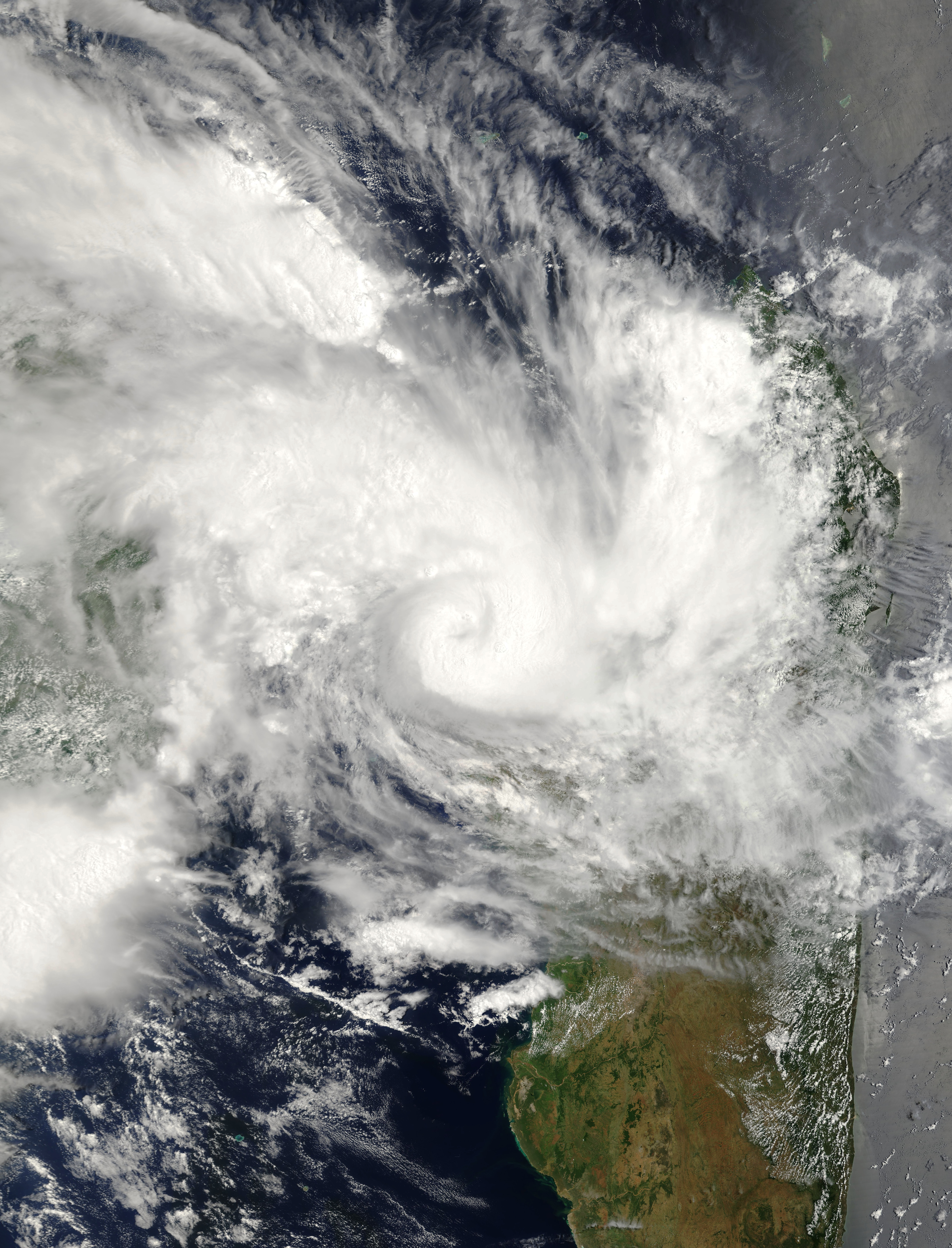
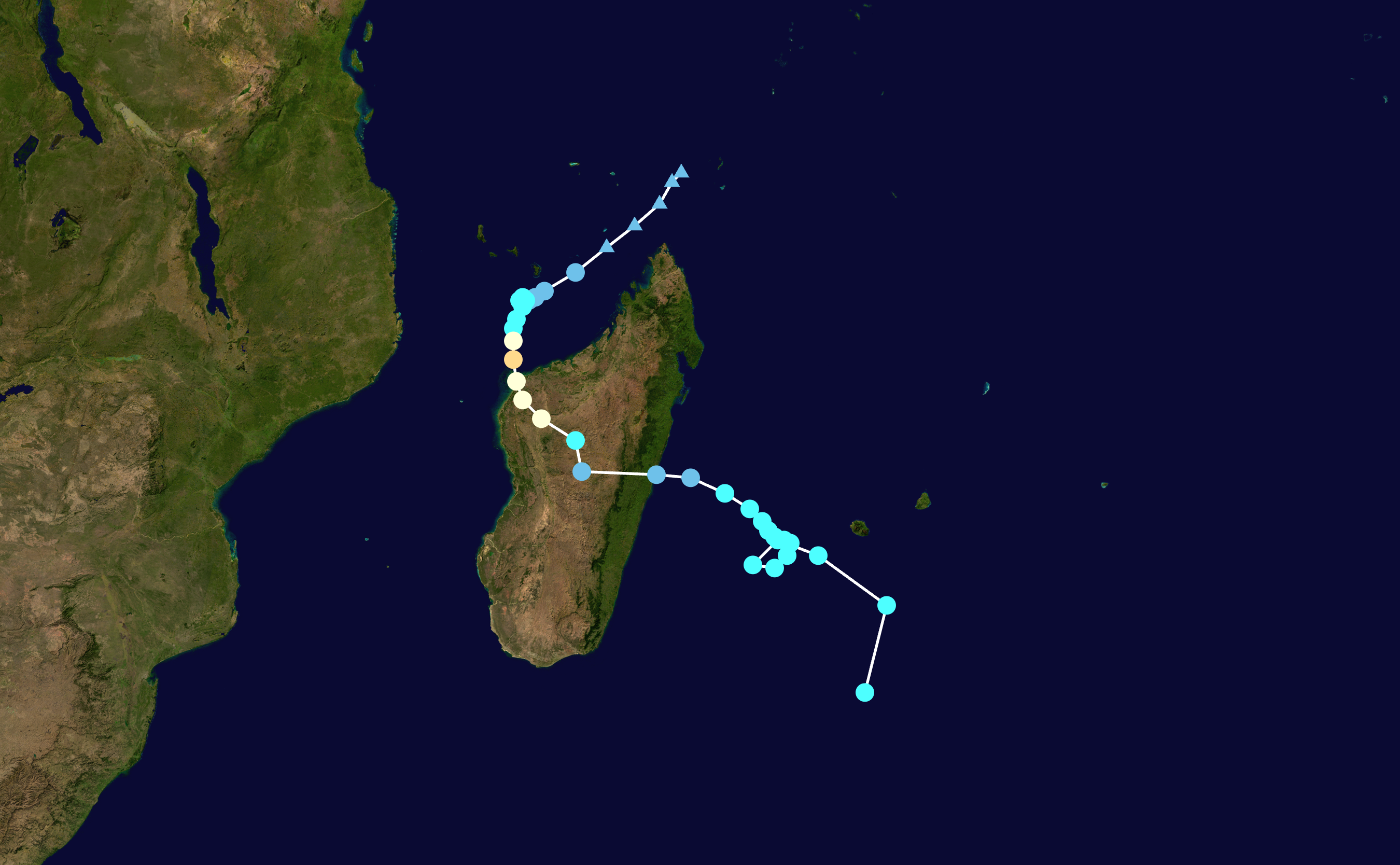
- Duration: January 22 – February 1
- Peak intensity: 130 km/h (80 mph) (10-min); 972 hPa (mbar)

An area of disturbed weather formed north of Madagascar and was designated as Tropical Disturbance 08R on January 24. On the next day it was upgraded to Tropical Depression 08R by Météo-France, while the JTWC issued a TCFA on the developing system. it was then upgraded to "Moderate Tropical Storm Fame" by the Sub-Regional Tropical Cyclone Advisory Centre in Madagascar. It remained nearly stationary and by January 26 it was upgraded to a severe tropical storm. The storm made landfall over northwestern Madagascar as a severe tropical storm on January 27. Later that day the system temporarily reached tropical cyclone stage just before landfall near Malagasy. It dissipated early on January 28 over Madagascar. The system, however, regenerated on January 29 as it re-emerged over water and became a tropical depression once again. However, Fame did not strengthen further due to interaction with Cyclone Gula, and after being declared extratropical, Météo-France redeclared the system tropical and issued its last advisory.

Strong winds from the storm damaged numerous mobile homes, shrubbery, and trees. At least 13 people were killed and about 20,000 people were left homeless. Maximum sustained winds were recorded up to 120 km/h (75 mph) and rainfall peaked at 146.7 millimetres (0.28 in) in Besalampy. Total damages from the storm were estimated at 100 million Malagasy ariary ($51,000 USD). After regenerating in the southern Indian Ocean, Fame produced torrential rains over Reunion, peaking at 875 mm (34.4 in) over a three-day span, 731 mm (28.8 in) of which fell in 48 hours. The system, in combination with Gula, produced high waves, peaking at 8 m (26 ft) along the coasts of Reunion. A peak wind gust of 112 km/h (70 mph) was recorded at Gros Piton Ste-Rose

=== Tropical Cyclone Gula ===
- Tropical cyclone (MFR)
- Category 2 tropical cyclone (SSHWS)
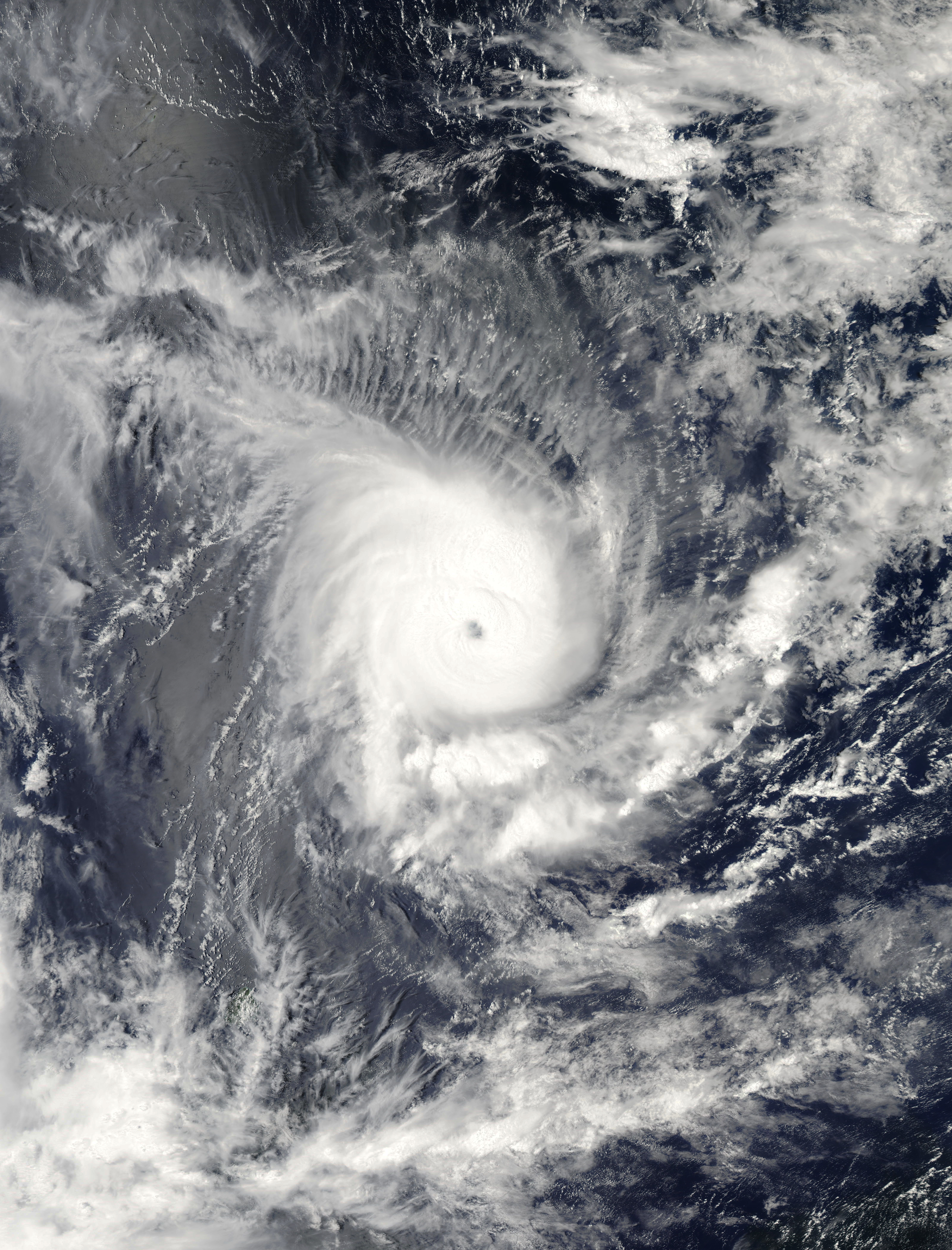
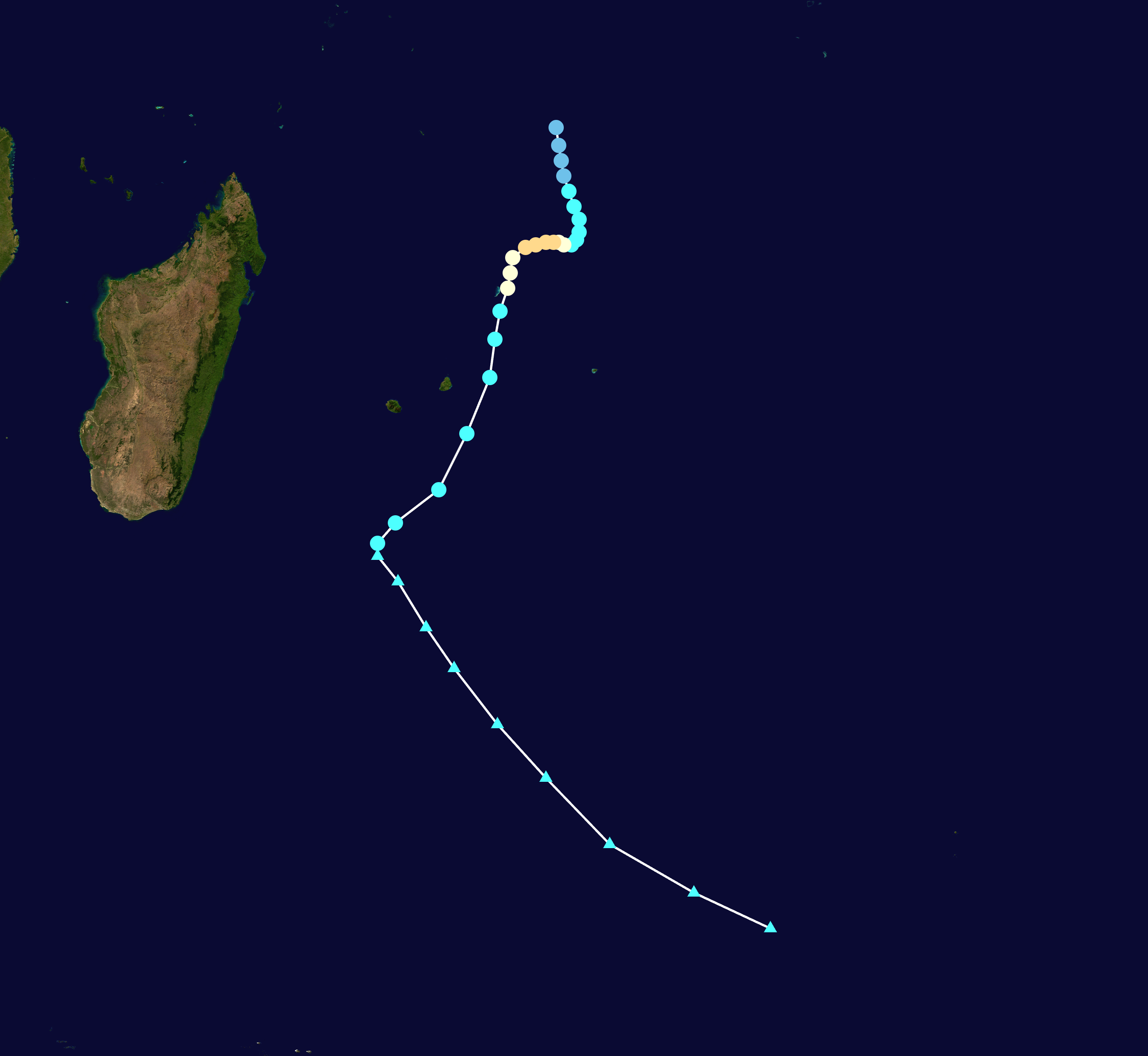
- Duration: January 25 – February 1
- Peak intensity: 155 km/h (100 mph) (10-min); 950 hPa (mbar)

An area of disturbed weather formed over the south-central Indian Ocean in the fourth week of January. It slowly developed and Météo-France began monitoring it as a disturbed area of weather on January 26. It was upgraded to a tropical depression later that day and was named as moderate tropical storm Gula on January 27 by the Mauritius Meteorological Service. Intensification continued and it was upgraded to a severe tropical storm on January 28. The intensification trend became more rapid early on January 29 as a clear eye developed and the storm became a tropical cyclone. After weakening and oscillating between severe and moderate tropical storm status, Météo-France declared it an extratropical depression, and then issued its last advisory on February 2.

=== Intense Tropical Cyclone Hondo ===
- Intense tropical cyclone (MFR)
- Category 4 tropical cyclone (SSHWS)
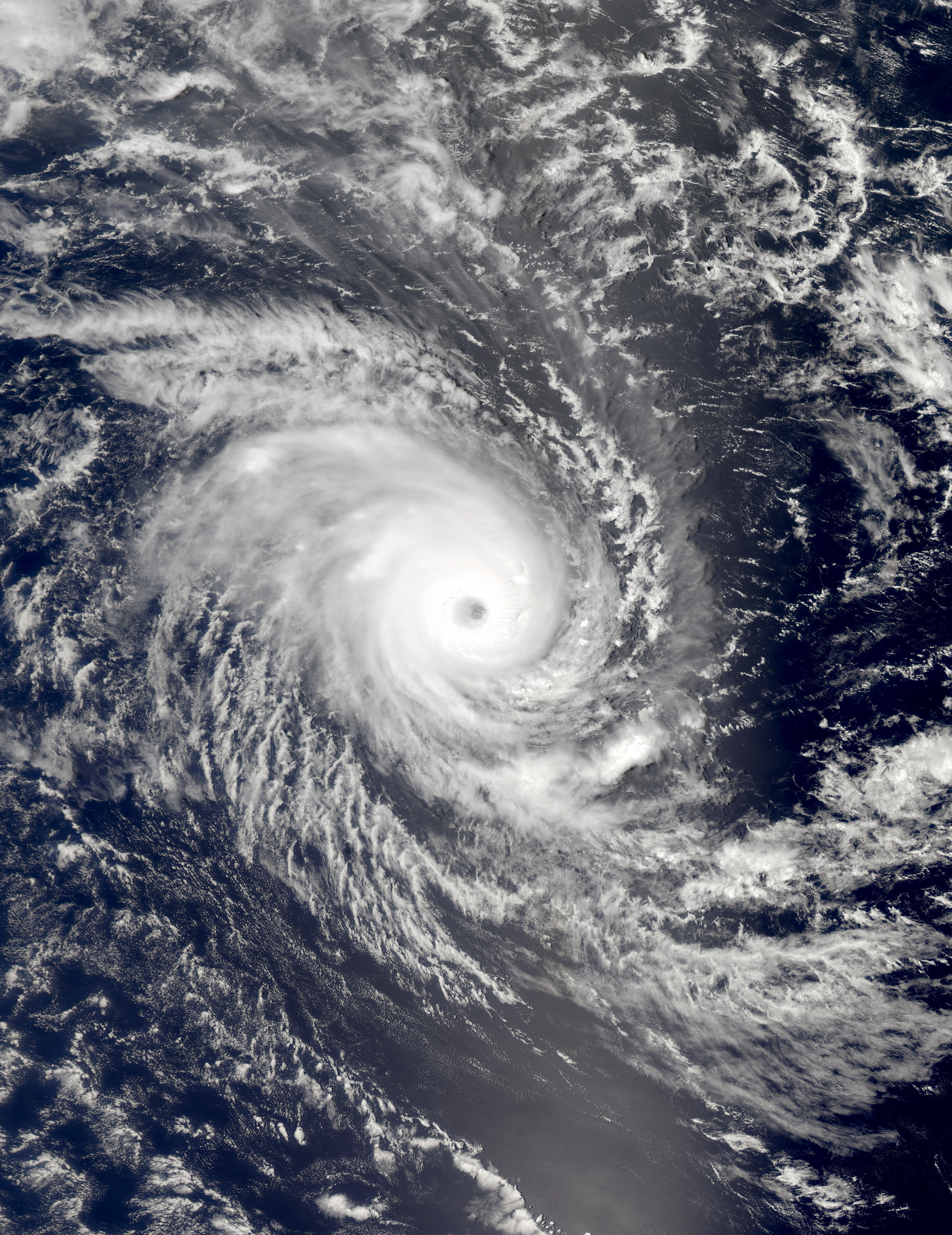
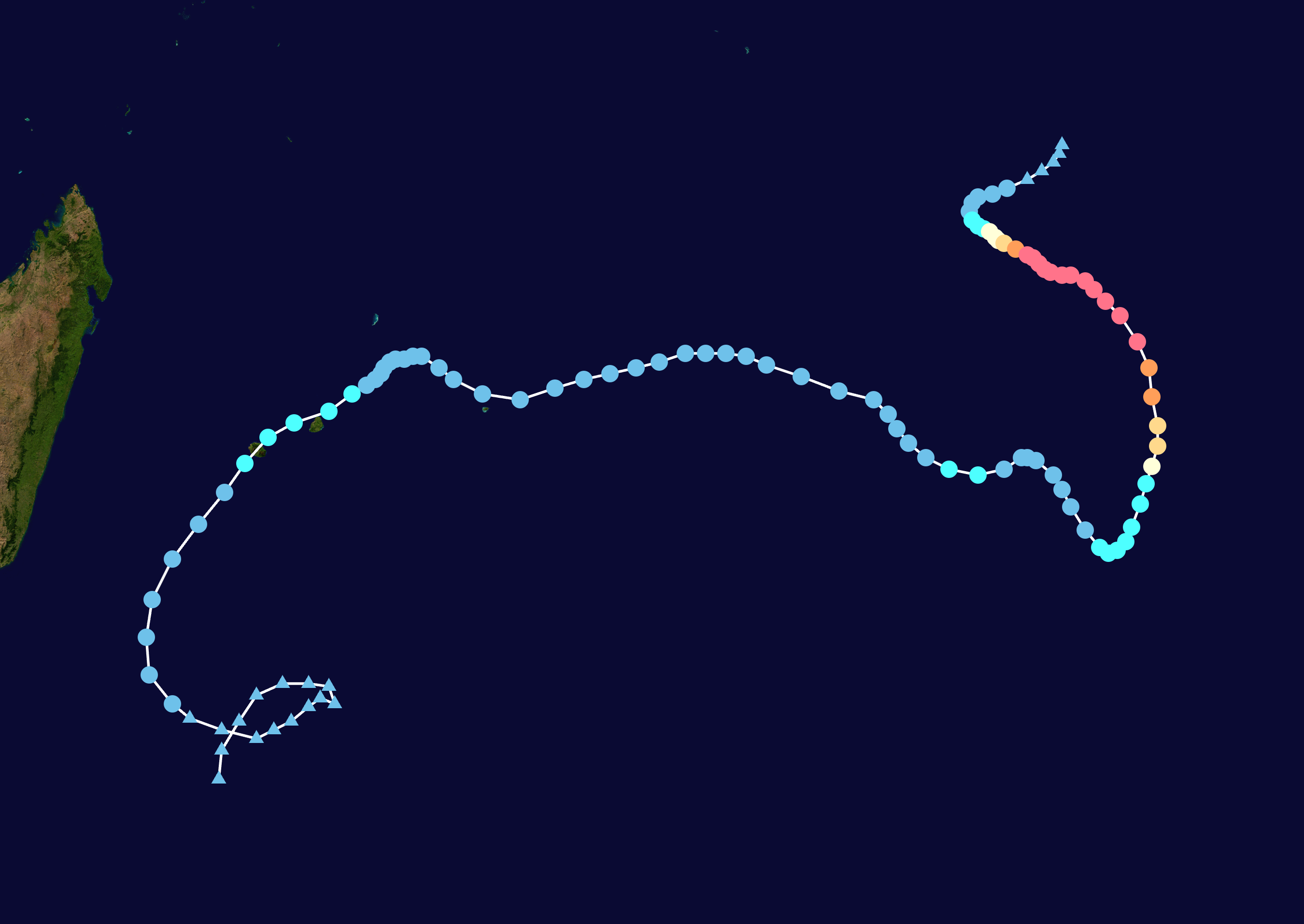
- Duration: February 2 – February 29
- Peak intensity: 215 km/h (130 mph) (10-min); 915 hPa (mbar)

The third tropical cyclone and first intense tropical cyclone of the season, Hondo developed out of a tropical disturbance in early February about 1,020 km (630 mi) east-southeast of Diego Garcia. The disturbance quickly strengthened, becoming a moderate tropical storm on February 4 and a severe tropical storm the following day. After a brief period of slower intensification, Hondo rapidly intensified into an intense tropical cyclone and reached its peak intensity with winds of 215 km/h (134 mph) 10-minute winds) on February 7. Around the same time that Météo-France assessed Hondo to have peaked, the JTWC reported that the storm had attained winds of 240 km/h (150 mph) 1-minute winds), equivalent to a strong Category 4 hurricane.

The cyclone gradually weakened over the next several days due to an increase in forward speed and a decrease in sea surface temperatures. On February 12, Hondo rapidly degenerated into a remnant-low-pressure area. Over the following week, the remnant low traveled in a general west-northwest direction with no development. On February 20, about 2,780 km (1,730 mi) northeast of where the final advisories were issued, the storm began to regenerate. The next day, advisories were issued on Tropical Disturbance Ex-Hondo, which briefly strengthened into a tropical depression. However, according to the Joint Typhoon Warning Center, Hondo continued to strengthen and attained winds of 95 km/h (59 mph) 1-minute winds) before passing directly over Réunion. Interaction with the island caused the storm to weaken and degenerate into a remnant low once more. The storm dissipated on February 29 after executing a counterclockwise loop.

Sustained winds of 50 km/h (30 mph) with gusts up to 76 km/h (47 mph) were recorded on Mauritius while sustained winds of 55 km/h (35 mph) with gusts up to 99 km/h (62 mph) were recorded on Réunion. The highest rainfall total was recorded at Takamaka, totaling to 750 mm (30 in). Up to 760,000 people were affected on Réunion and overall damage was minimal.

=== Intense Tropical Cyclone Ivan ===
- Intense tropical cyclone (MFR)
- Category 4 tropical cyclone (SSHWS)
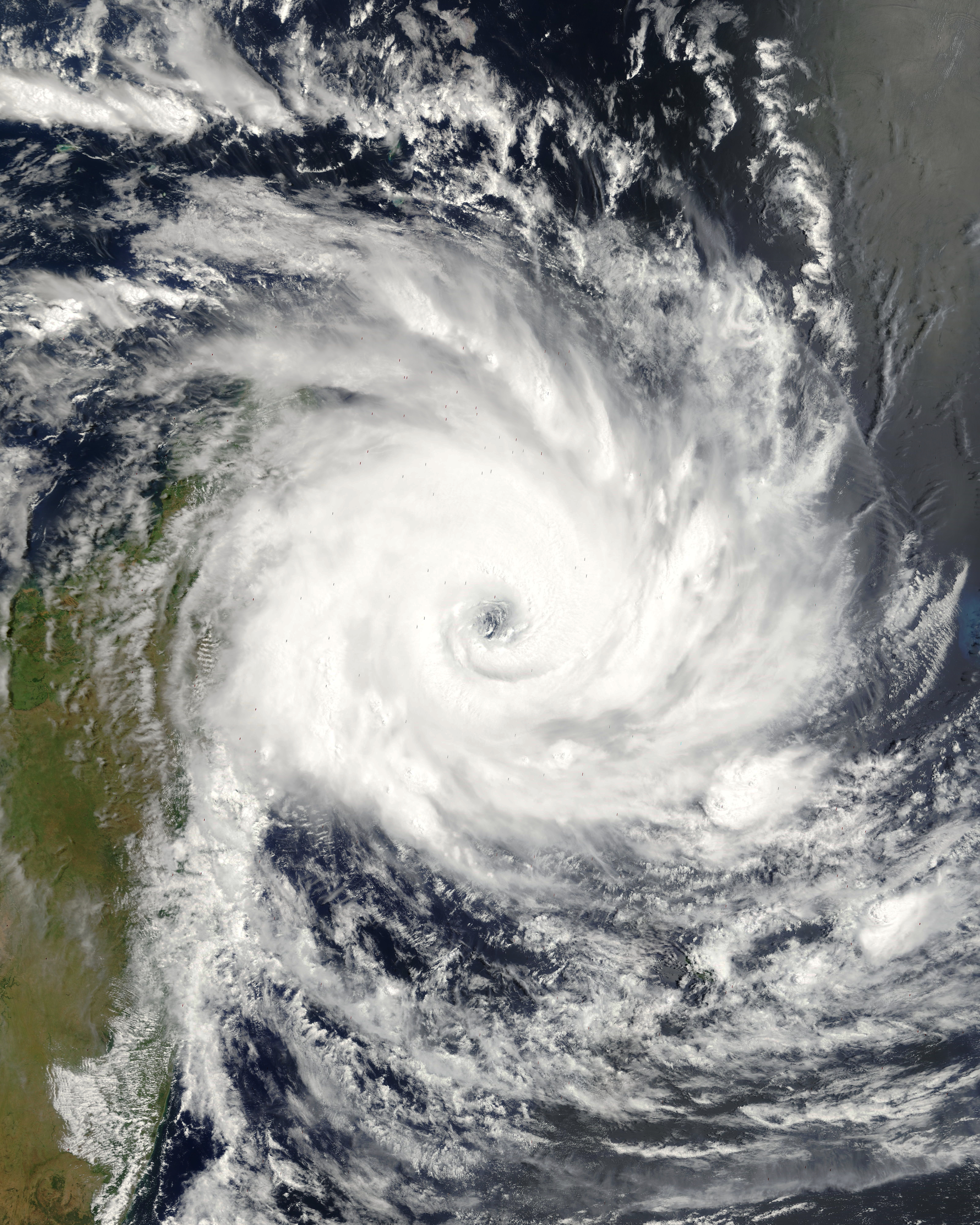
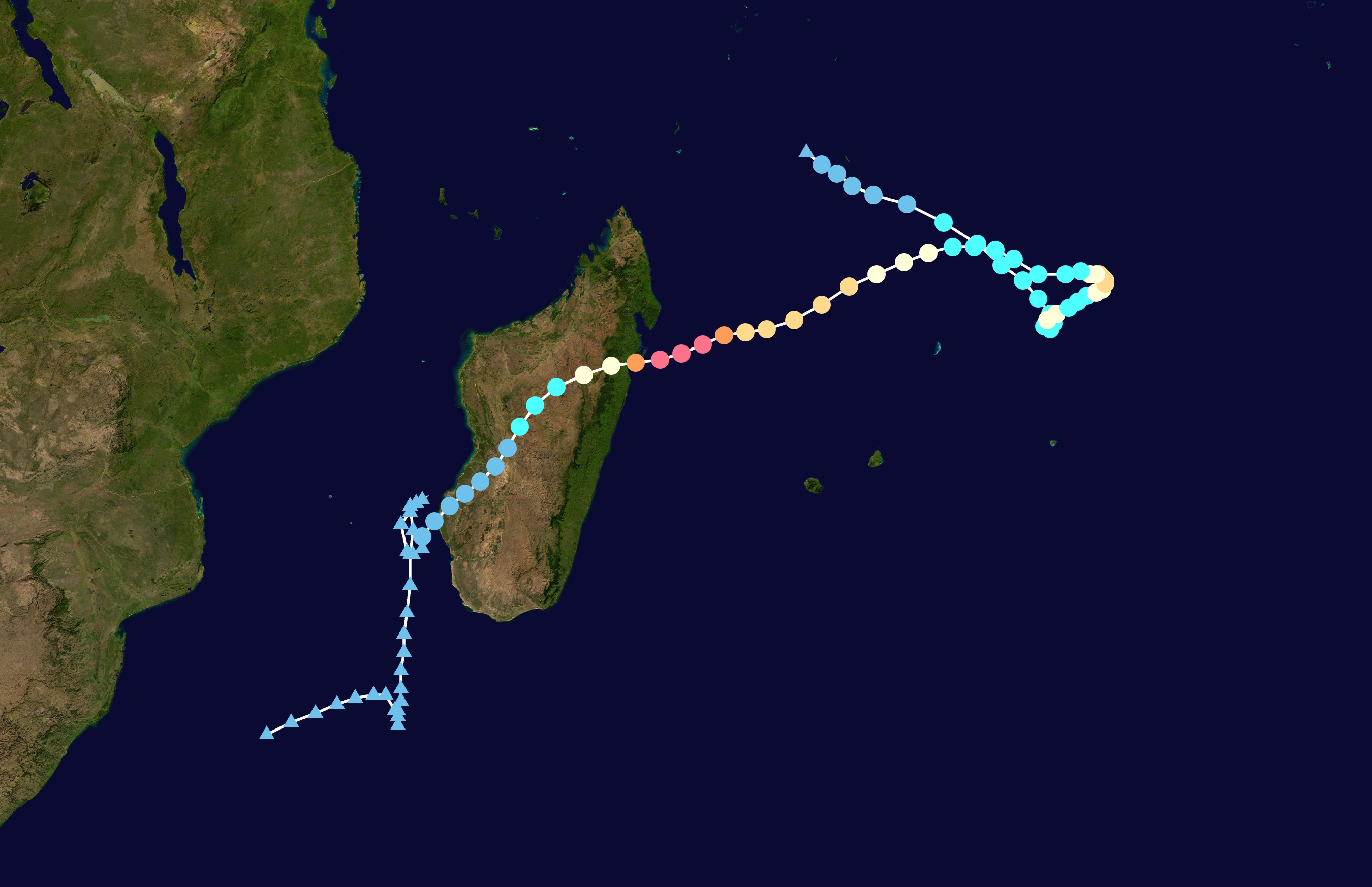
- Duration: February 5 – February 27
- Peak intensity: 185 km/h (115 mph) (10-min); 930 hPa (mbar)

Early on February 7, an area of disturbed weather northeast of Madagascar, heading southeast, was designated Tropical Depression 11R. Like Cyclone Hondo before it, the storm intensified quickly into Moderate Tropical Storm Ivan, then reached severe status a few hours later. Severe status was held until February 11, when Ivan became a tropical cyclone for a short time. Ivan was moving quite slowly, and this, coupled with medium shear, weakened it to moderate tropical storm status by February 12. During this time, Ivan made two complete loops in the open sea. However, by February 14, it had sped up and entered a more favourable environment, becoming a severe tropical storm. On February 15, Ivan was reupgraded to a tropical cyclone as favourable conditions persisted. Ivan was further upgraded to an Intense Tropical Cyclone on February 16 as it moved closer to Madagascar. Ivan made landfall north of Fanoarivo, Madagascar on February 17. Once overland, rapid weakening occurred due to the rugged terrain of the island. Ivan was forecast to regenerate over the Mozambique Channel into a tropical depression once it left Madagascar.

Ivan traversed Madagascar, heading southwest. Its remnants emerged back over water on February 21, and Météo-France resumed advisories on "filling depression Ex-Ivan". Ivan, severely disrupted by Madagascar, did not strengthen any further; the last advisory was issued on February 22.

A preliminary casualty estimate due to Ivan is 93. The cyclone left over 330,000 homeless. Sainte Marie, the island where Ivan made landfall, is estimated to have 75% of its buildings completely destroyed. Total damages from Ivan total more than $30 million (2008 USD).

=== Intense Tropical Cyclone Jokwe ===
- Intense tropical cyclone (MFR)
- Category 3 tropical cyclone (SSHWS)
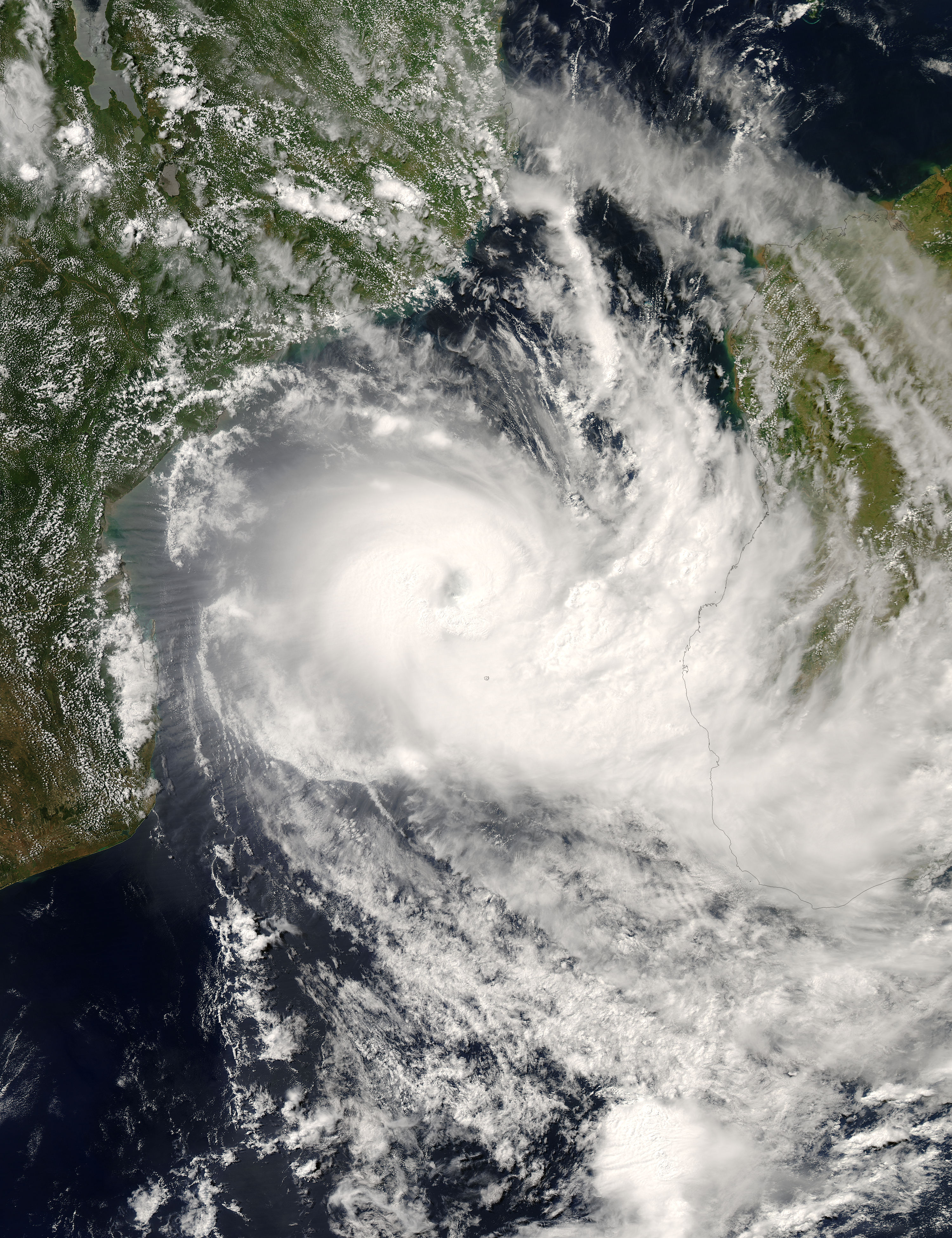
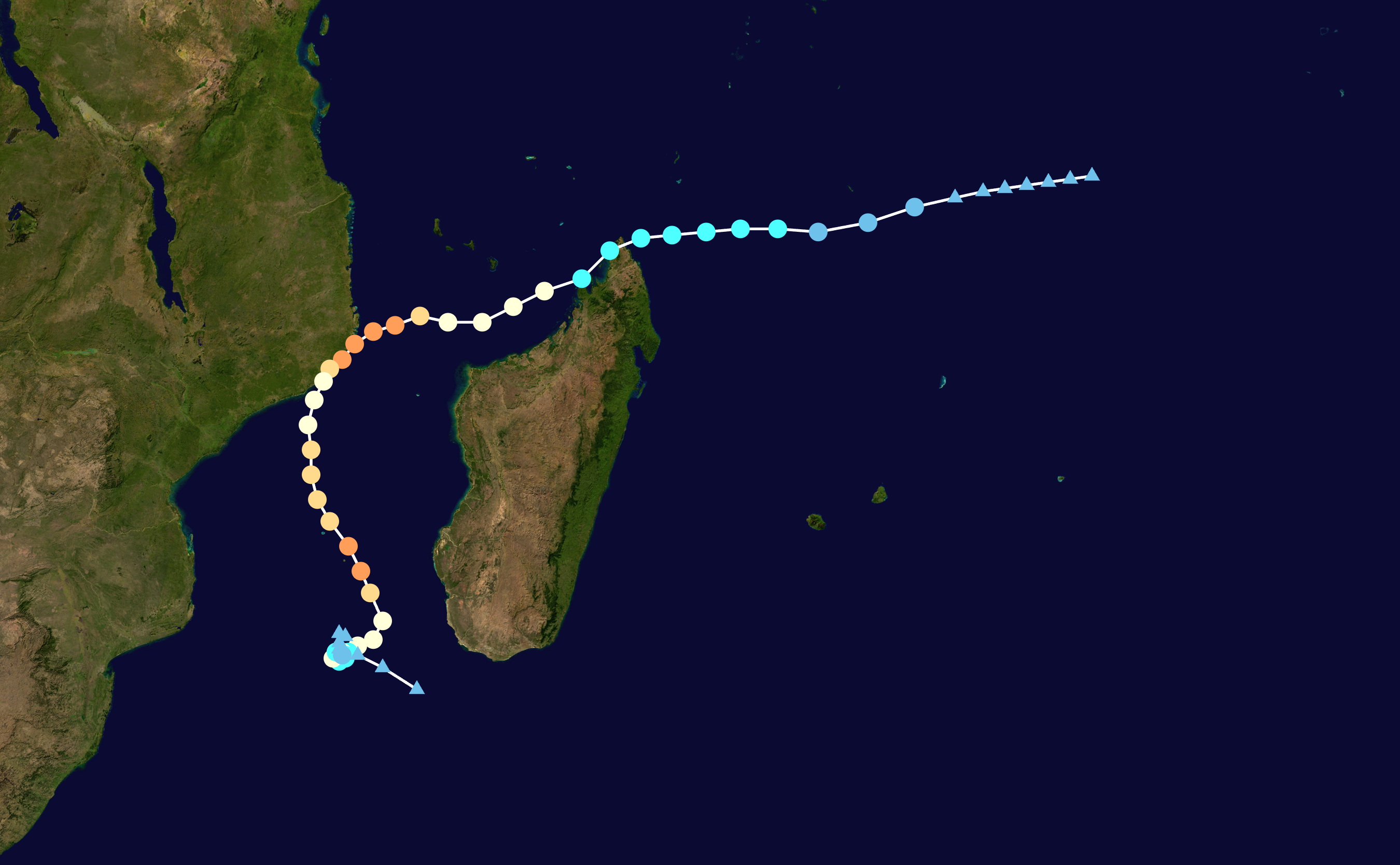
- Duration: March 2 – March 16
- Peak intensity: 195 km/h (120 mph) (10-min); 940 hPa (mbar)

On March 4, the JTWC issued a TCFA on an area of disturbed weather developing northeast of Madagascar. Soon after, Météo-France upgraded the system to tropical disturbance status. Early on March 5, the JTWC issued its first advisory on the developing system, designating it as Tropical Cyclone 22S. Later that day, the disturbance was upgraded to Moderate Tropical Storm Jokwe. At noon on March 6, after a bout of rapid intensification, Jokwe was upgraded to a tropical cyclone, skipping severe storm status. After being briefly downgraded to a severe tropical storm, Jokwe was reupgraded to a tropical cyclone, then an intense tropical cyclone on the evening of March 7. Jokwe made landfall between Mozambique Island and Angoche Island early on March 8.

Over the next two days, Jokwe fell down to severe tropical storm following land interaction with Mozambique. Later that day, Jokwe was reupgraded to a tropical cyclone, and became an intense tropical cyclone again early on March 11. Jokwe then came under the influence of moderate windshear, and weakened down to a severe tropical storm again by March 12. Jokwe was re-upgraded to a Tropical Cyclone early March 13, but was soon downgraded again to a severe tropical storm later that day due to another increase in wind shear. Shear had been steadily increasing, and on March 13 Jokwe's movement slowed down drastically; it moved around the same general area of ocean and weakened. Final warnings were issued by the JTWC late March 14, and by Météo-France early March 15.

44 houses were destroyed in Madagascar as Jokwe hit the northern tip of the island. At least 20 people were killed and over 9,000 homes destroyed as Jokwe passed through north-eastern Mozambique. At least 100,000 have been displaced by Jokwe. The United Nations World Food Programme (WFP) provided emergency food aid to 60,000 people affected by Jokwe in Mozambique.

=== Intense Tropical Cyclone Kamba ===
- Intense tropical cyclone (MFR)
- Category 4 tropical cyclone (SSHWS)
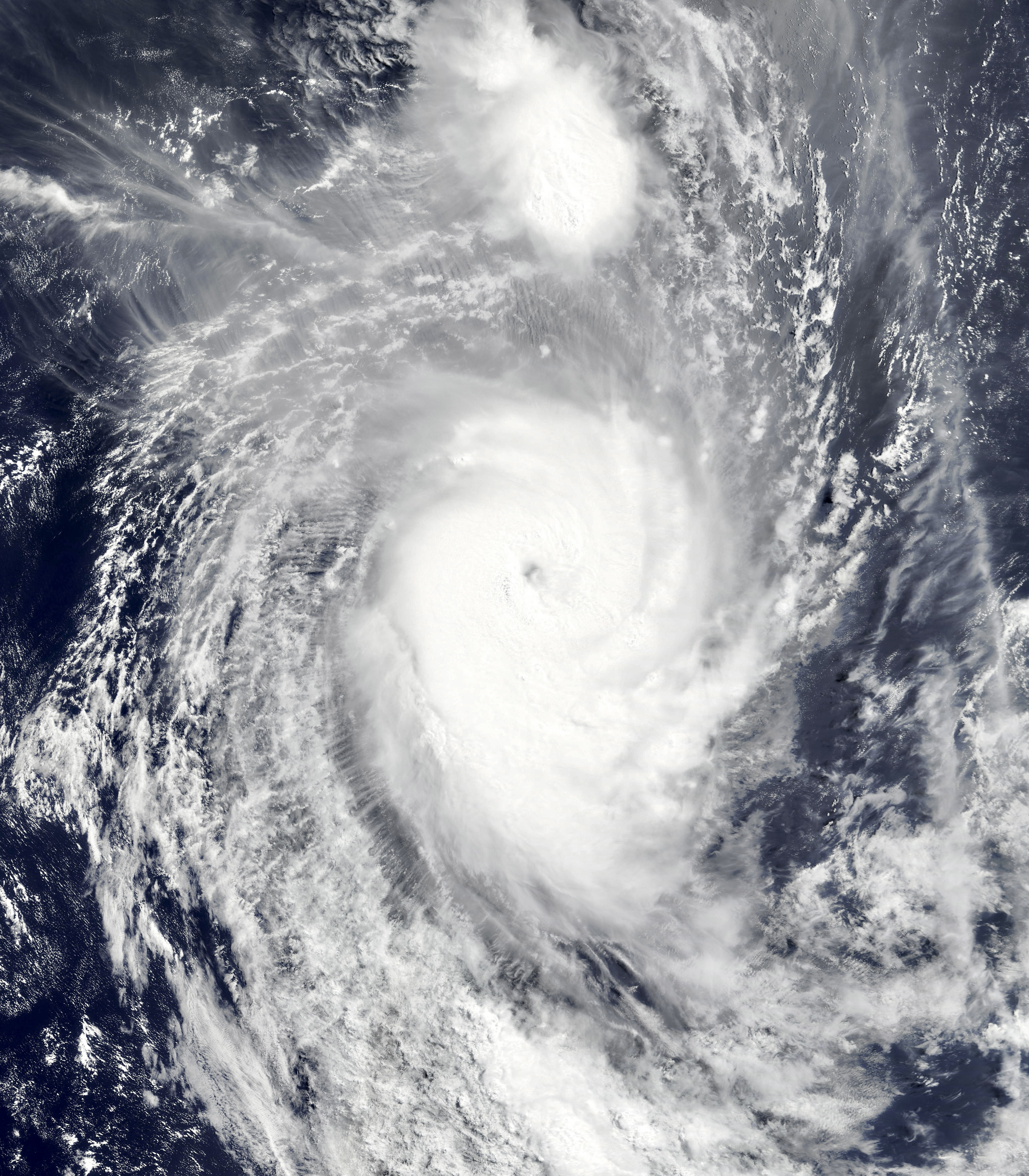
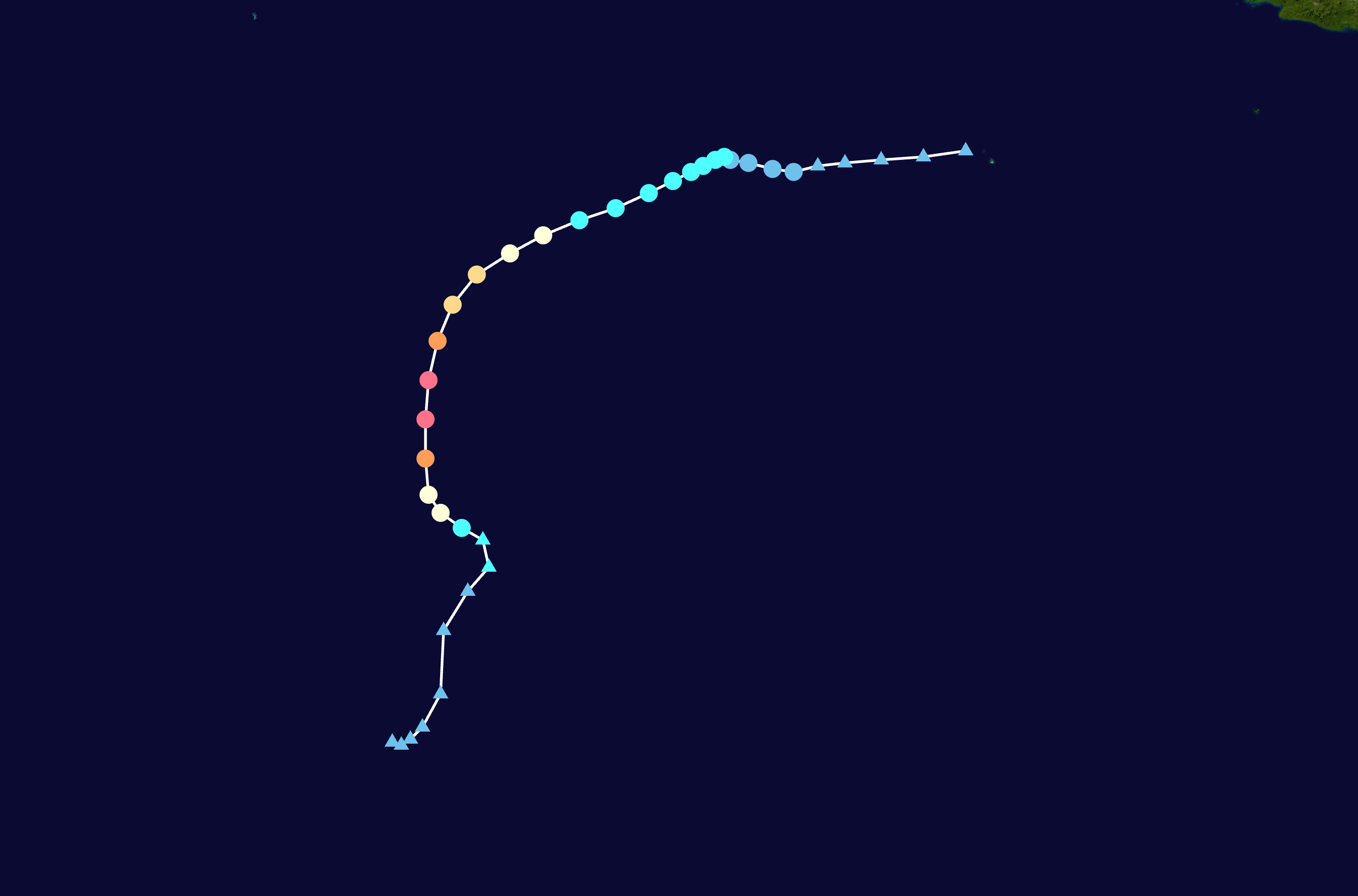
- Duration: March 5 – March 14
- Peak intensity: 185 km/h (115 mph) (10-min); 930 hPa (mbar)

On March 5, MFR classified a tropical disturbance just outside of their area of responsibility. By March 7, deep convection developing along the western half of the system as the vertical wind shear—previously inhibiting development—began to weaken. Later that day, MFR upgraded the disturbance to a tropical depression. Late on March 8, the depression further strengthened into a tropical storm; it was subsequently assigned the name Kamba by the Meteorological service in Mauritius, a name contributed by the Comoros. Wind shear continued to impact the organization of the system as the eastern portion of the storm remained partially exposed. Tracking southwest, Kamba quickly intensified into a severe tropical storm at 1200 UTC on March 9 as winds increased to 95 km/h (59 mph) 10-minute winds). Not long after being upgraded to a severe tropical storm, the JTWC estimated that Kamba had strengthened into the equivalent of a Category 1 hurricane with winds of 120 km/h (75 mph). Early on March 10, Kamba began to undergo rapid intensification and Météo-France upgraded the storm to a tropical cyclone as an eye developed. At this time, Kamba also started to turn towards the south as it tracked around the northwestern edge of a strong subtropical ridge.

With low wind shear, Kamba continued to intensify throughout the first half of March 10, reaching its peak intensity with winds of 185 km/h (115 mph) 10-minute winds) with a minimum pressure of 930 hPa (mbar) at 1200 UTC according to Météo-France. Kamba developed a 46 km (29 mi) wide eye as it reached peak intensity. Shortly after, the JTWC upgraded Kamba to a Category 4 equivalent cyclone with winds of 215 km/h (134 mph) 1-minute winds). By March 11, Kamba began to move over cooler waters and into an area of higher wind shear, causing the storm to deteriorate. About 24 hours after reaching peak intensity, the storm began to undergo an extratropical transition and weakened to a tropical cyclone. Early on March 12, the JTWC issued their final advisory on Kamba as it rapidly weakened over open waters. At the same time, Météo-France further downgraded the cyclone to a severe tropical storm as winds dropped below 120 km/h (75 mph) 10-minute winds). Kamba further weakened to a moderate tropical storm as convection associated with the storm significantly diminished. The final advisory by Météo-France was issued shortly after as the storm degenerated into a remnant-low-pressure area. The remnants of Kamba persisted for a few more days before ultimately dissipating at 0600 UTC on March 14.

=== Moderate Tropical Storm Lola ===
- Moderate tropical storm (MFR)
- Tropical storm (SSHWS)
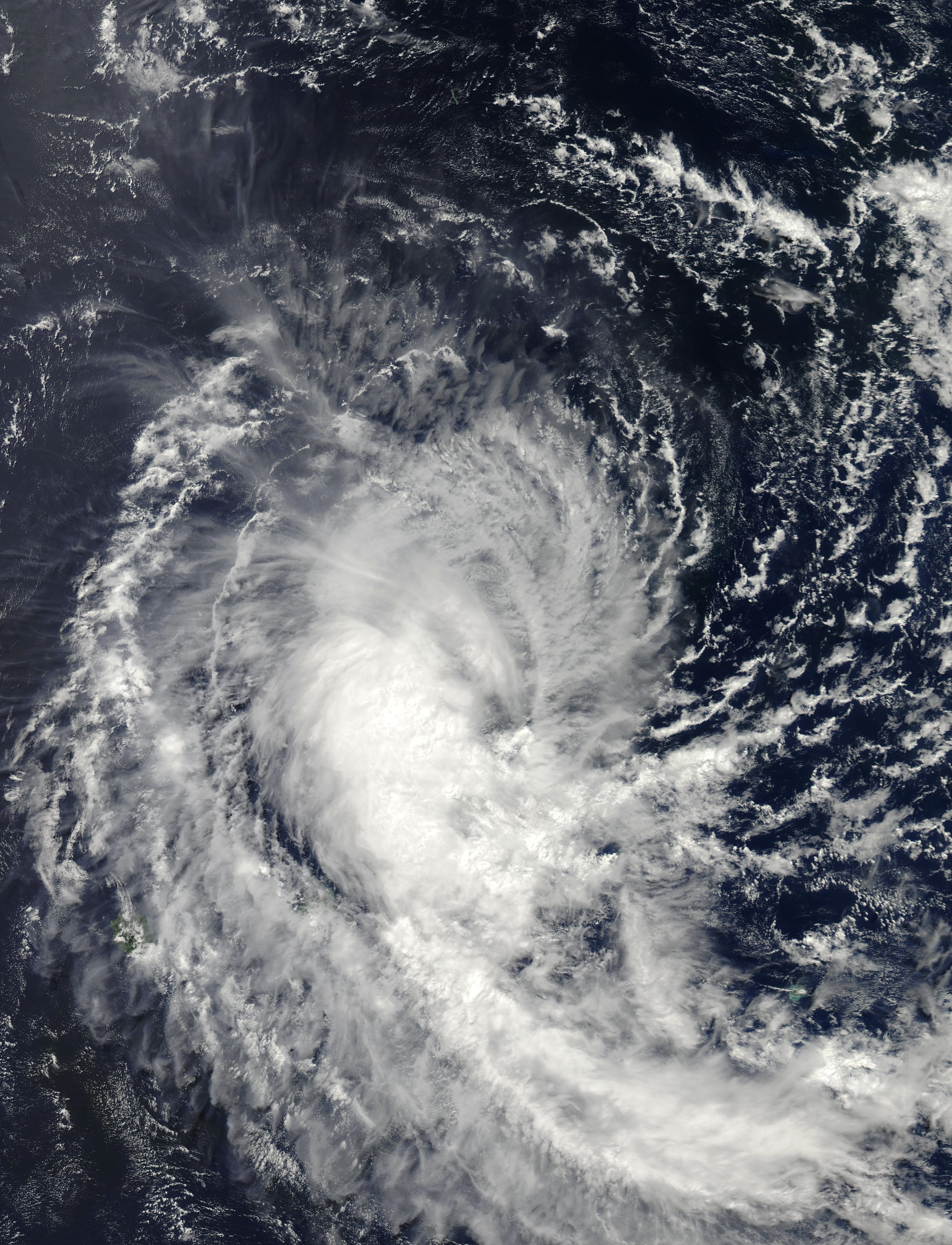
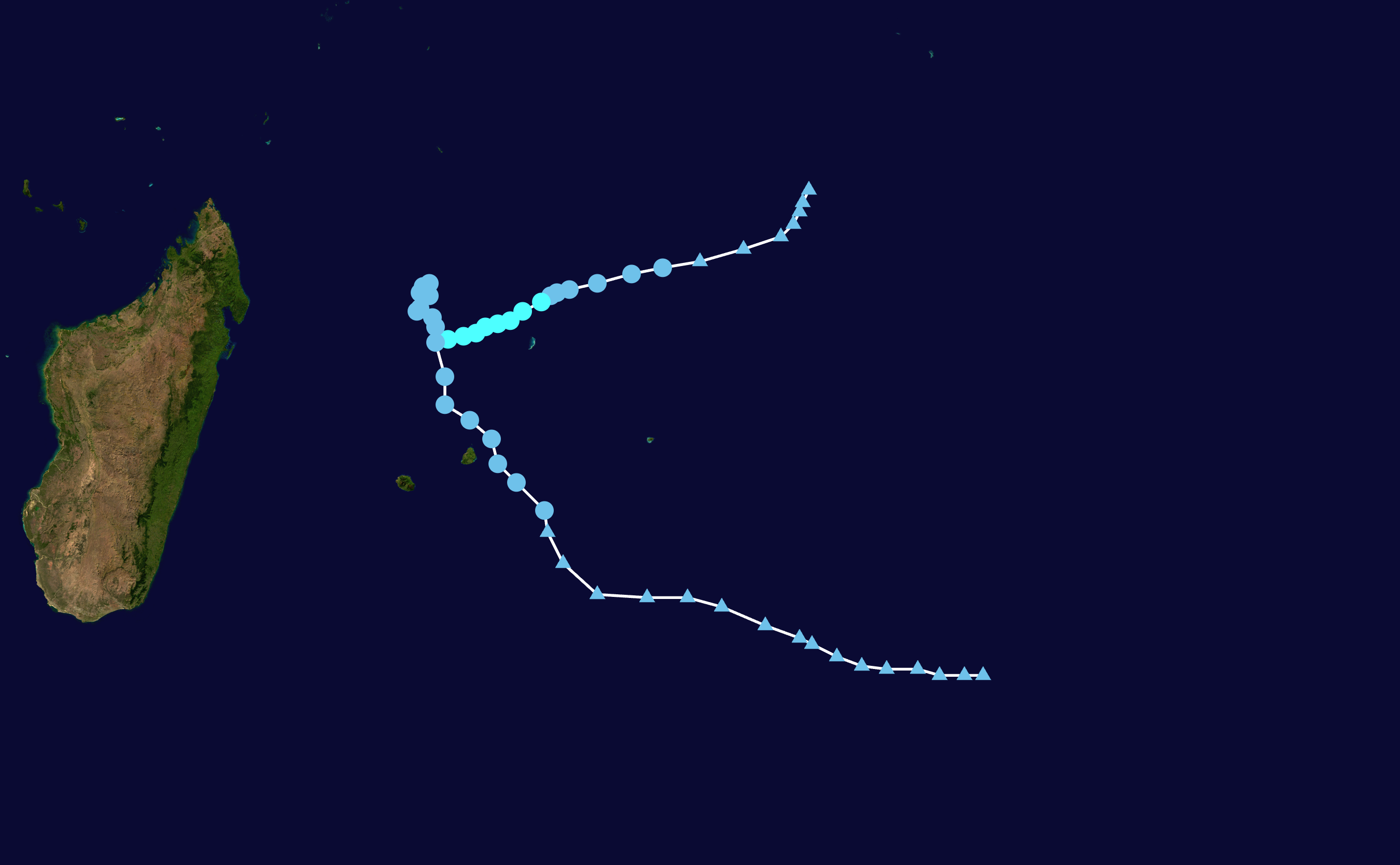
- Duration: March 18 – March 27
- Peak intensity: 65 km/h (40 mph) (10-min); 994 hPa (mbar)

An area of disturbed weather north east of Mauritius, identified on March 20, became a tropical disturbance on March 21, and a depression later that day. The JTWC initiated advisories on Tropical Cyclone 25S around the same time. The system became Moderate Tropical Storm Lola early March 22 based on it having gale-force winds in the southern quadrant far away from the center and due to it having deep convection. Lola weakened back to a tropical depression that afternoon as it began to suffer from moderate to strong northeasterly shear. It alternated between depression and disturbance a few times, until the final advisory was issued on a zone of disturbed weather on March 26. The JTWC had issued its final advisory two days earlier, on March 24.

== Storm names ==
A tropical disturbance is named when it reaches moderate tropical storm strength. If a tropical disturbance reaches moderate tropical storm status west of 55°E, then the Sub-regional Tropical Cyclone Advisory Centre in Madagascar assigns the appropriate name to the storm. If a tropical disturbance reaches moderate tropical storm status between 55°E and 90°E, then the Sub-regional Tropical Cyclone Advisory Centre in Mauritius assigns the appropriate name to the storm. A new annual list is used every year so no names are retired.

- Ariel
- Bongwe
- Celina
- Dama
- Elnus
- Fame
- Gula
- Hondo
- Ivan
- Jokwe
- Kamba
- Lola
- Marabe (unused)
- Nungu (unused)
- Ofelia (unused)
- Pulane (unused)
- Qoli (unused)
- Rossana (unused)
- Sama (unused)
- Tuma (unused)
- Uzale (unused)
- Vongai (unused)
- Warona (unused)
- Xina (unused)
- Yamba (unused)
- Zefa (unused)

== Season effects ==
This table lists all the storms that developed in the Southern Hemisphere during the 2007–2008 South-West Indian Ocean cyclone season. It includes their intensity, duration, name, landfalls, deaths, and damages. With the exception of Tropical Cyclone 01U/01S all related to intensity is taken from Météo-France.

Name	Dates	Peak intensity			Areas affected	Damage (USD)	Deaths	Ref(s).
Name	Dates	Category	Wind speed	Pressure	Areas affected	Damage (USD)	Deaths	Ref(s).
01U/01S	July 26 — August 1, 2007	Moderate tropical storm	75 km/h (45 mph)	992 hPa (29.29 inHg)	None	None	None	
One	October 12 — 13, 2007	Tropical disturbance	45 km/h (30 mph)	1005 hPa (29.68 inHg)	None	None	None	
Lee-Ariel	November 15–28	Severe tropical storm	95 km/h (60 mph)	988 hPa (29.18 inHg)	None	None	None	
Bongwe	November 17–28	Severe tropical storm	105 km/h (65 mph)	976 hPa (28.82 inHg)	None	None	None	
Celina	December 11–23	Moderate tropical storm	75 km/h (45 mph)	992 hPa (29.29 inHg)	Madagascar	Minimal	1	
Dama	December 17–21	Moderate tropical storm	65 km/h (40 mph)	995 hPa (29.38 inHg)	None	None	None	
Elnus	December 29 – January 3	Moderate tropical storm	65 km/h (40 mph)	995 hPa (29.38 inHg)	Madagascar	None	None	
Seven	January 6–8	Tropical disturbance	35 km/h (20 mph)	1,003 hPa (29.62 inHg)	None	None	None	
Fame	January 22 – February 1	Tropical cyclone	130 km/h (80 mph)	972 hPa (28.70 inHg)	Malagasy, Madagascar	$51,000	13	
Gula	January 25 – February 1	Tropical cyclone	155 km/h (95 mph)	950 hPa (28.05 inHg)	None	None	None	
Hondo	February 2–29	Intense tropical cyclone	215 km/h (135 mph)	915 hPa (27.02 inHg)	Mauritius, Réunion	Minimal	None	
Ivan	February 5–27	Intense tropical cyclone	185 km/h (115 mph)	930 hPa (27.46 inHg)	Madagascar	$30 million	93	
Jokwe	March 2–16	Intense tropical cyclone	195 km/h (120 mph)	940 hPa (27.76 inHg)	Madagascar, Mozambique	$8 million	16	
Kamba	March 5–14	Intense tropical cyclone	185 km/h (115 mph)	930 hPa (27.46 inHg)	None	None	None	
Lola	March 18–27	Moderate tropical storm	65 km/h (40 mph)	994 hPa (29.35 inHg)	None	None	None	
Season aggregates
14 systems	October 12 – March 27		215 km/h (135 mph)	915 hPa (27.02 inHg)		>$38.1 million	>123	

== See also ==
- List of Southern Hemisphere tropical cyclone seasons
- Tropical cyclones in 2007 and 2008
- Atlantic hurricane seasons: 2007, 2008
- Pacific hurricane seasons: 2007, 2008
- Pacific typhoon seasons: 2007, 2008
- North Indian Ocean cyclone seasons: 2007, 2008
