= Maningoza Special Reserve =

- IUCN category IV (habitat/species management area)
- Location within Madagascar
- Location: Melaky Region, Madagascar
- Nearest city: Besalampy
- Coordinates: 16.75°S 44.483333°E
- Area: 59.73 km^{2} (23.06 sq mi)
- Designation: Special reserve
- Designated: 1956

Maningoza Special Reserve is a 9,826 hectares (24,280 acres) wildlife reserve near Besalampy in Madagascar. It was created in 1956 to protect the many endemic plants and animals, and it also contains some of the last remaining areas of dry deciduous forest on the island.

== Geography ==
The Maningoza Special Reserve was established in 1956 and is in the Melaky Region of Madagascar. The reserve is to the east of Antsalova and the nearest hotel accommodation is in Besalampy. It can be reached by boat on the Manambolo River although the reserve is only accessible to tourists during the dry season. It contains one of the last remaining areas of dry tropical forest on the island and has a dry climate with an average temperature of 24 °C (75 °F). The annual rainfall is 1,100 mm (43 in) and mostly falls during the monsoon season which is between November and April. The forest grows on iron-rich (or ferralitic) soil which forms due to the chemical weathering of most of the minerals; except for quartz. There is an accumulation of secondary minerals and clays such as gibbiste, goethite and kaolinite, and an accumulation of humus. The people living in the villages around the reserve, are dependent for its resources and use the land for grazing zebu, and grow cassava, maize and rice.

== Flora and fauna ==
The largest habitat, within the reserve is 5,611 hectares (13,870 acres) is subtropical moist forest which is some of the last remaining in Madagascar. There is also over 2,600 hectares (6,400 acres) of savanna including a small area with palm trees and 7 hectares (17 acres) of bamboo. The birds are poorly studied with fifty-two species recorded including twenty-five endemics. A number are of conservation concern, such as Schlegel's asity (Philepitta schlegeli) which is classified by the International Union for Conservation of Nature (IUCN) as near threatened due to habitat loss. Other resident birds include the giant coua (Coua gigas), Coquerel's coua (Coua coquereli), sickle-billed vanga (Falculea palliata) and the Sakalava weaver (Ploceus sakalava).

Of the fifteen species of mammal on the reserve, five are lemurs. Verreaux's sifaka (Propithecus verreauxi) is of most concern to the IUCN which is considered to be endangered, and the common brown lemur (Eulemur fulvus) which is near threatened. The other lemurs are, the eastern lesser bamboo lemur (Hapalemur griseus), gray mouse lemur (Microcebus murinus) and the fat-tailed dwarf lemur (Cheirogaleus medius).

It is crossed by the Manambolo River.

== See also ==
- List of national parks of Madagascar
