= 2013–14 South-West Indian Ocean cyclone season =

Event of tropical cyclone formation in the Indian Ocean

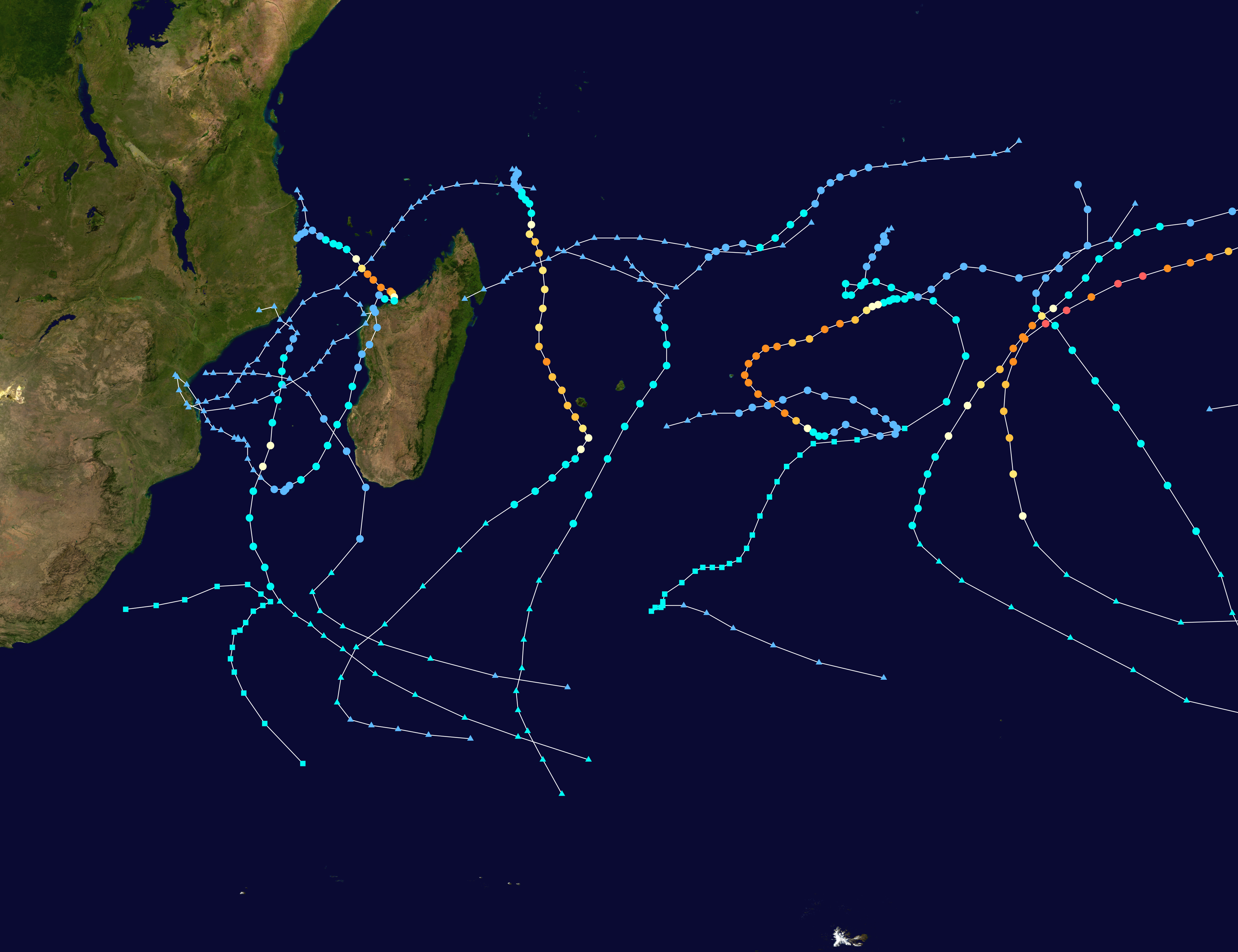
- Season summary map

Seasonal boundaries
- First system formed: October 23, 2013
- Last system dissipated: April 6, 2014

Strongest storm
- Name: Hellen
  - Maximum winds: 230 km/h (145 mph) (10-minute sustained)
  - Lowest pressure: 915 hPa (mbar)

Seasonal statistics
- Total disturbances: 15
- Total depressions: 13
- Total storms: 11
- Tropical cyclones: 5
- Intense tropical cyclones: 5
- Very intense tropical cyclones: 2 (record high, tied with 2014–15 and 2022–23)
- Total fatalities: 11 total
- Total damage: At least $122 million (2014 USD)

Related articles
- 2013–14 Australian region cyclone season; 2013–14 South Pacific cyclone season

The 2013–14 South-West Indian Ocean cyclone season was an above-average event in tropical cyclone formation. The season officially began on July 1, 2013, though the first tropical system designated by Météo-France was a short-lived tropical disturbance that developed on July 8. However, the first named storm was Cyclone Amara in December. Bruce was the first very intense tropical cyclone since Edzani in 2010, which originated from the Australian region. The strongest system of the cyclone season was Hellen, also one of the most intense tropical cyclones over the Mozambique Channel. The season officially ended on June 30, 2014.

Within this basin, tropical and subtropical disturbances are officially monitored by the Regional Specialised Meteorological Centre on Réunion island, while the Mauritius and Madagascar weather services assign names to significant tropical and subtropical disturbances.

== Systems ==
=== Moderate Tropical Storm 01 ===
- Moderate tropical storm (MFR)
- Tropical storm (SSHWS)
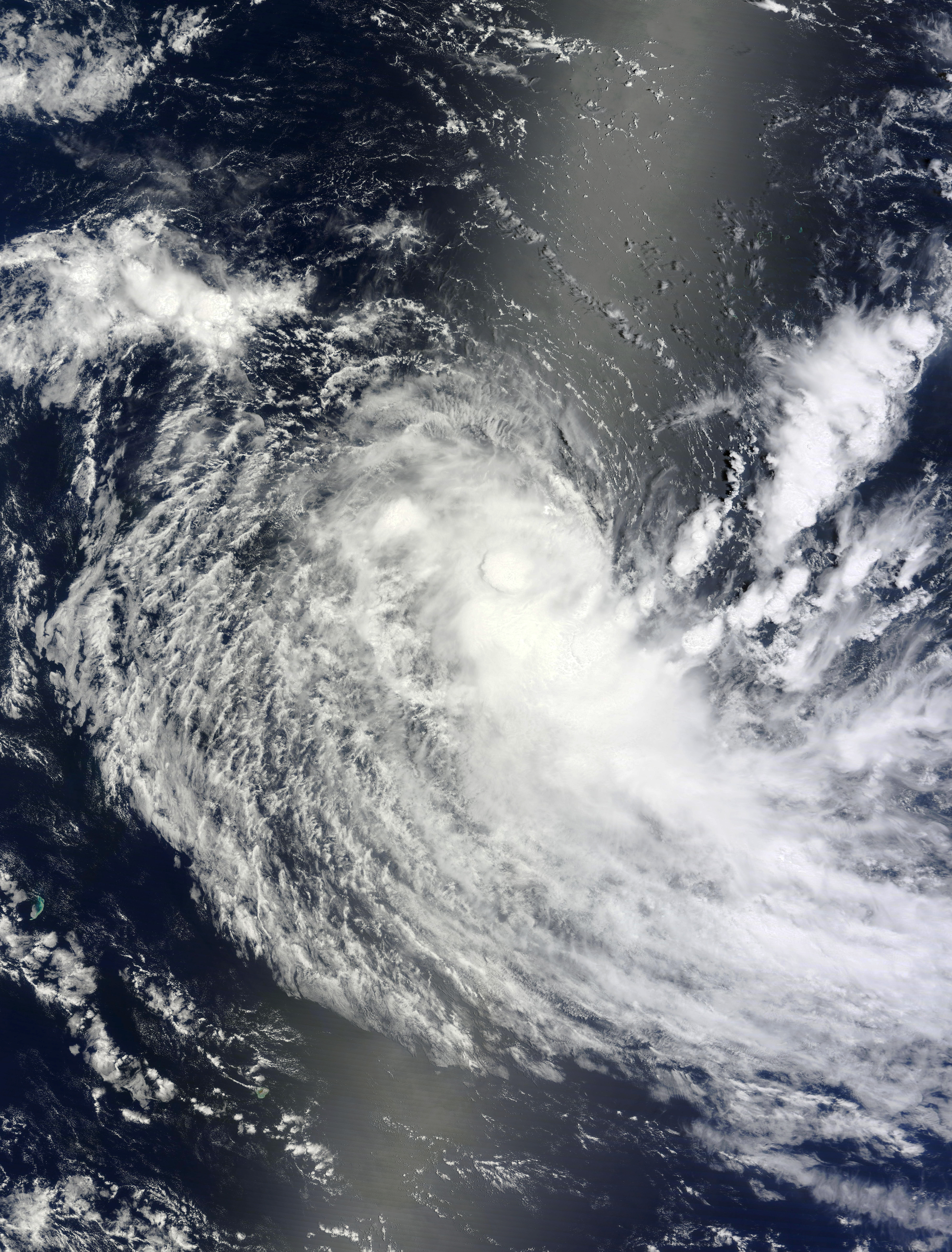
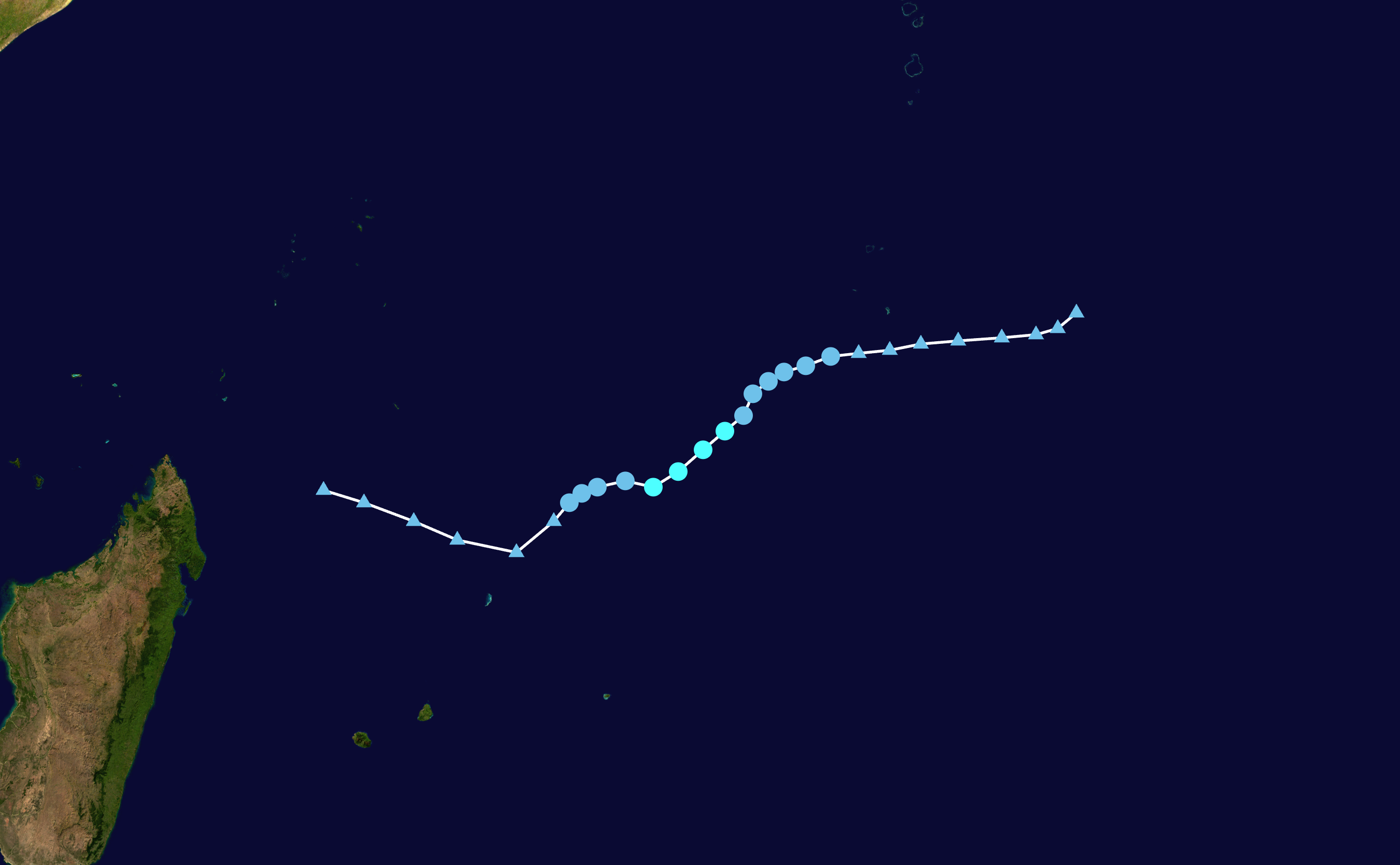
- Duration: October 23 – October 27
- Peak intensity: 65 km/h (40 mph) (10-min); 997 hPa (mbar)

The predecessor to the season's first designated tropical depression began as an area of persistent convection well removed from any landmasses. The JTWC began issuing products on the storm complex on October 21, noting recent consolidation patterns and its association with an ill-defined low-level circulation centre. Over subsequent hours, the system developed a central region of convection with incipient rainbands. Despite these signs of potential tropical cyclogenesis in the very near future, the storm remained unclassified for several days as it tracked generally towards the west. At 1200 UTC on October 25, however, Météo-France classified the system as a tropical disturbance. Though upper-level atmospheric conditions were rather conducive for continued strengthening, factors including decreasing convergence and marginally sustainable sea surface temperatures were expected to inhibit tropical development, and as such initial forecasts only anticipated minimal and gradual strengthening.

At 0600 UTC on October 26, Météo-France upgraded the system to tropical depression status. Forecasts upon the system's upgrade to tropical depression intensity expected more significant intensification, with the depression expected to peak as a moderate tropical storm. However, the depression peaked in strength later that day with winds of 55 km/h (35 mph) and a minimum pressure of 1000 mbar (hPa; 29.53 inHg). This intensity was sustained for several hours before the storm began to slowly weaken early on October 27. During its weakening phase, the depression became elongated and its circulation center became exposed from the rest of the convection, and at 12:00 UTC that day, Météo-France reclassified the storm as a tropical disturbance. In an area no longer sufficient to support strengthening, the disturbance gradually diffused, and six hours later, Météo-France issued their last advisory on the system. The tropical depression was upgraded to Moderate Tropical Storm 01 during post-analysis of the season.

=== Intense Tropical Cyclone Amara ===
- Intense tropical cyclone (MFR)
- Category 4 tropical cyclone (SSHWS)
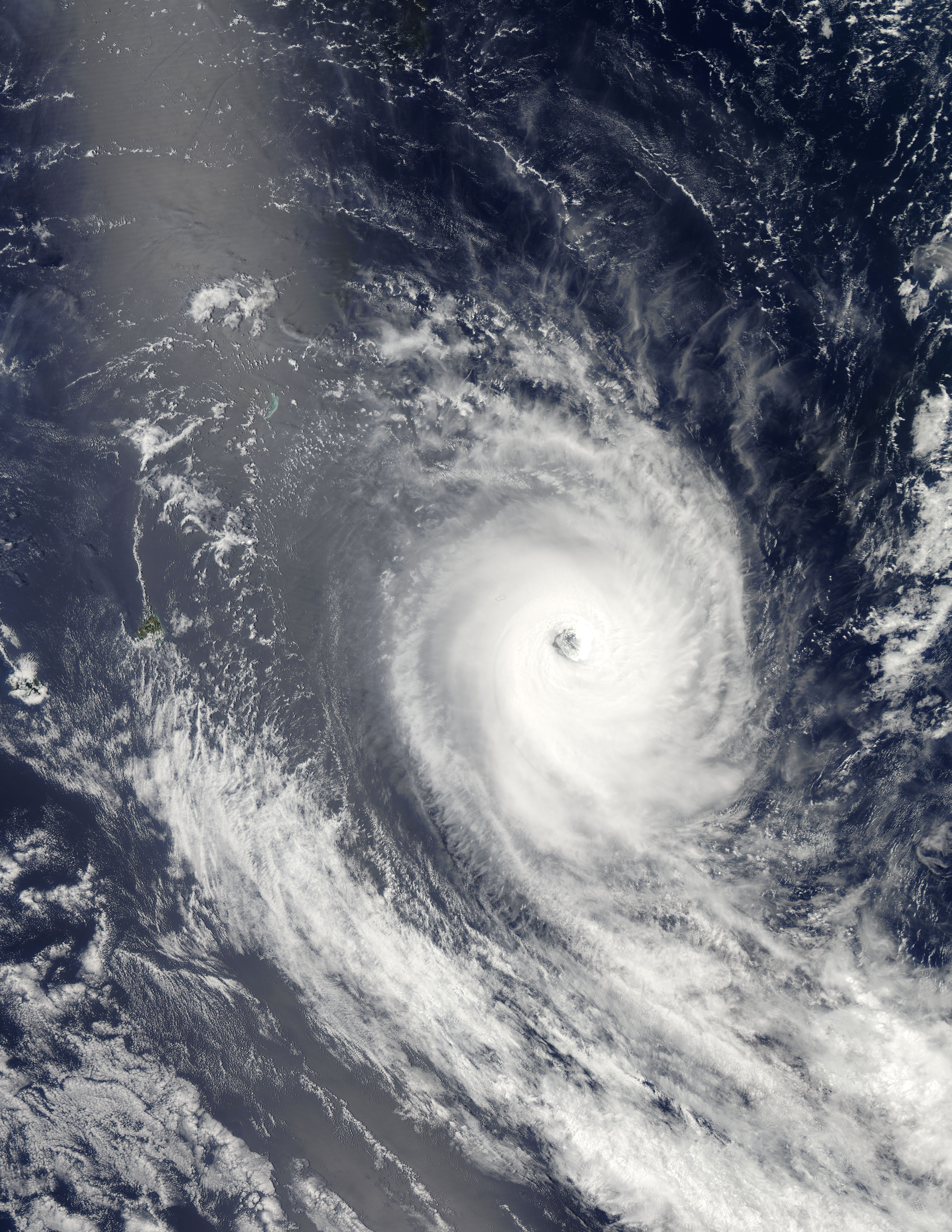
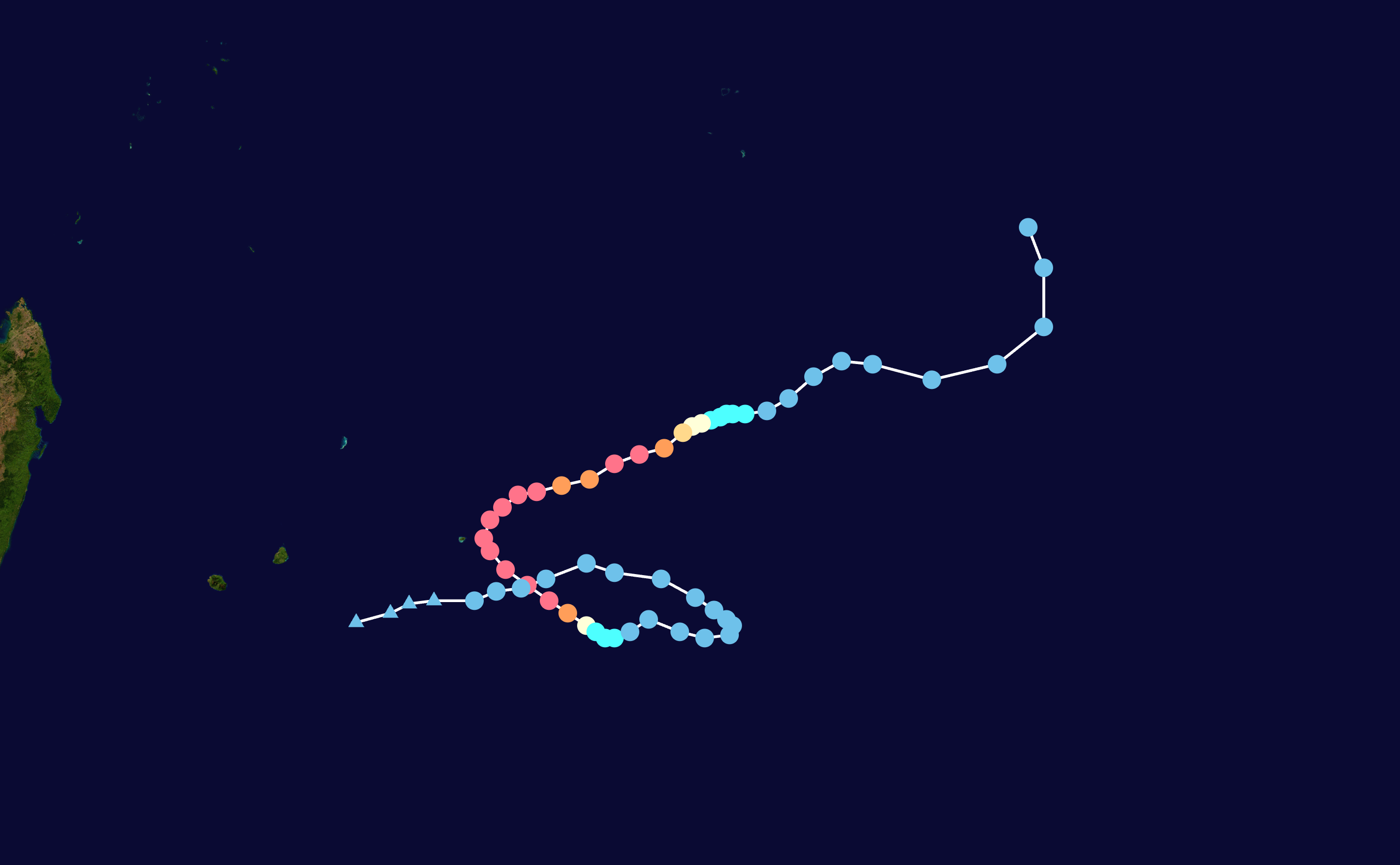
- Duration: December 14 – December 27
- Peak intensity: 205 km/h (125 mph) (10-min); 935 hPa (mbar)

Amara developed from a disturbance within the monsoon trough on December 14. The following day, the system attained tropical depression status. Despite its ill-defined organization, the depression was able to continue strengthening, reaching moderate tropical storm status on December 16 as it tracked southwest. Situated in a favorable atmospheric environment, a period of rapid intensification ensued after Amara reached tropical cyclone status on December 18. After fluctuating in strength, the cyclone peaked with maximum sustained winds of 205 km/h (125 mph) and a minimum barometric pressure of 933 mbar (hPa; 27.55 inHg) on December 21, making it an intense tropical cyclone based on the intensity scale utilized by Météo-France. Shortly after, wind shear strengthened as Amara tracked southeast, resulting in a weakening phase. The shearing effects caused the cyclone to rapidly decay, and by December 23, Amara was determined to have degenerated into a remnant low.

Amara was initially expected to track directly over the island of Rodrigues, prompting widespread precautionary measures and resulting in the issuance of a Class 4 warning – denoting a warning of highest urgency – by the Mauritius Meteorological Services. Though the tropical cyclone eventually passed to the east of the island, Amara was close enough to Rodrigues to severely affect the island. Strong winds, peaking at a measured 152 km/h (94 mph) in Pointe Canon, resulted in widespread infrastructural damage, including the tearing of metal sheeting and uprooting of trees. Widespread power outage cut power to 12,000 homes and shut off communications to and from the island. Heavy rains produced by Amara also triggered flooding in some locations and caused soil erosion.

=== Very Intense Tropical Cyclone Bruce ===
- Very intense tropical cyclone (MFR)
- Category 5 tropical cyclone (SSHWS)
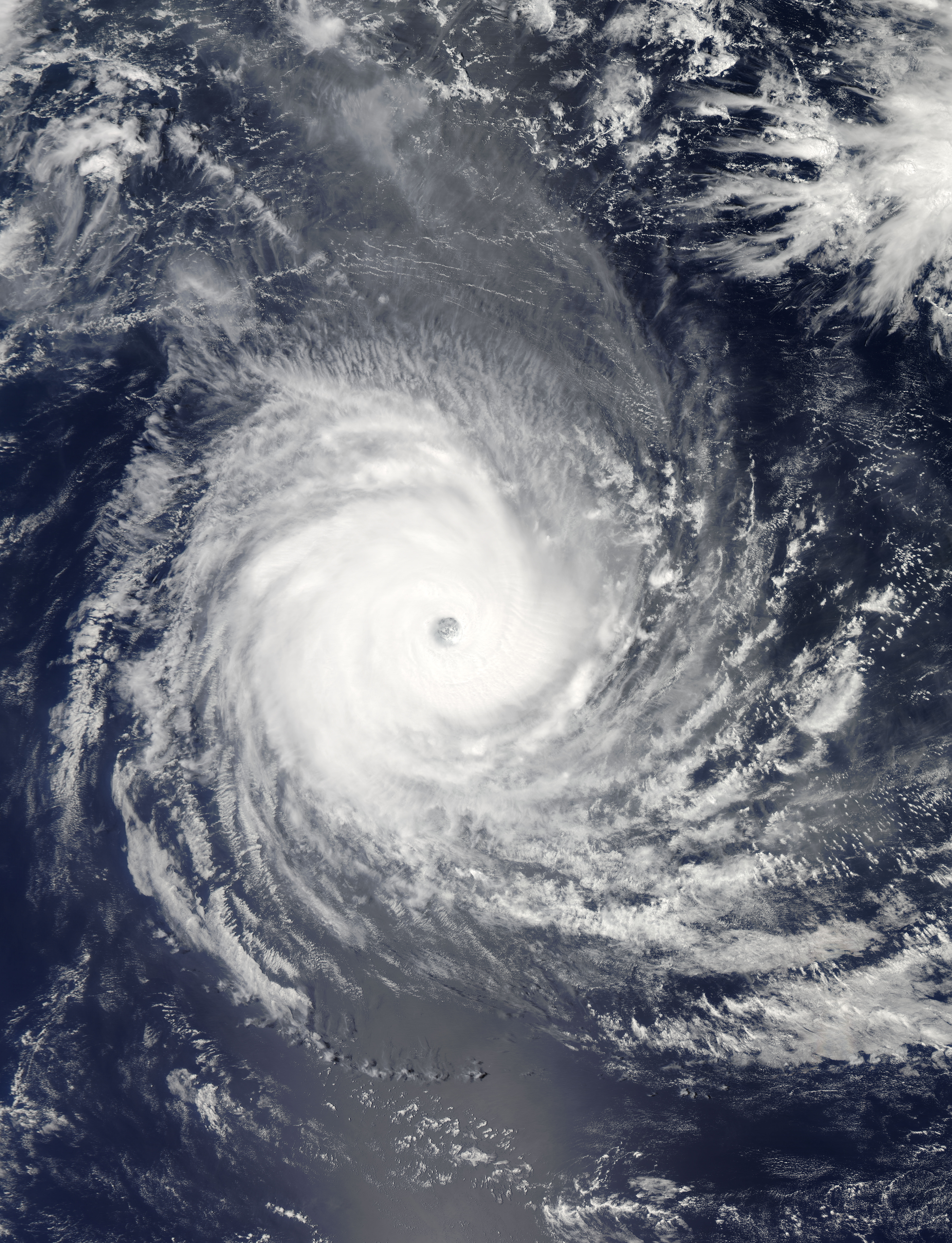
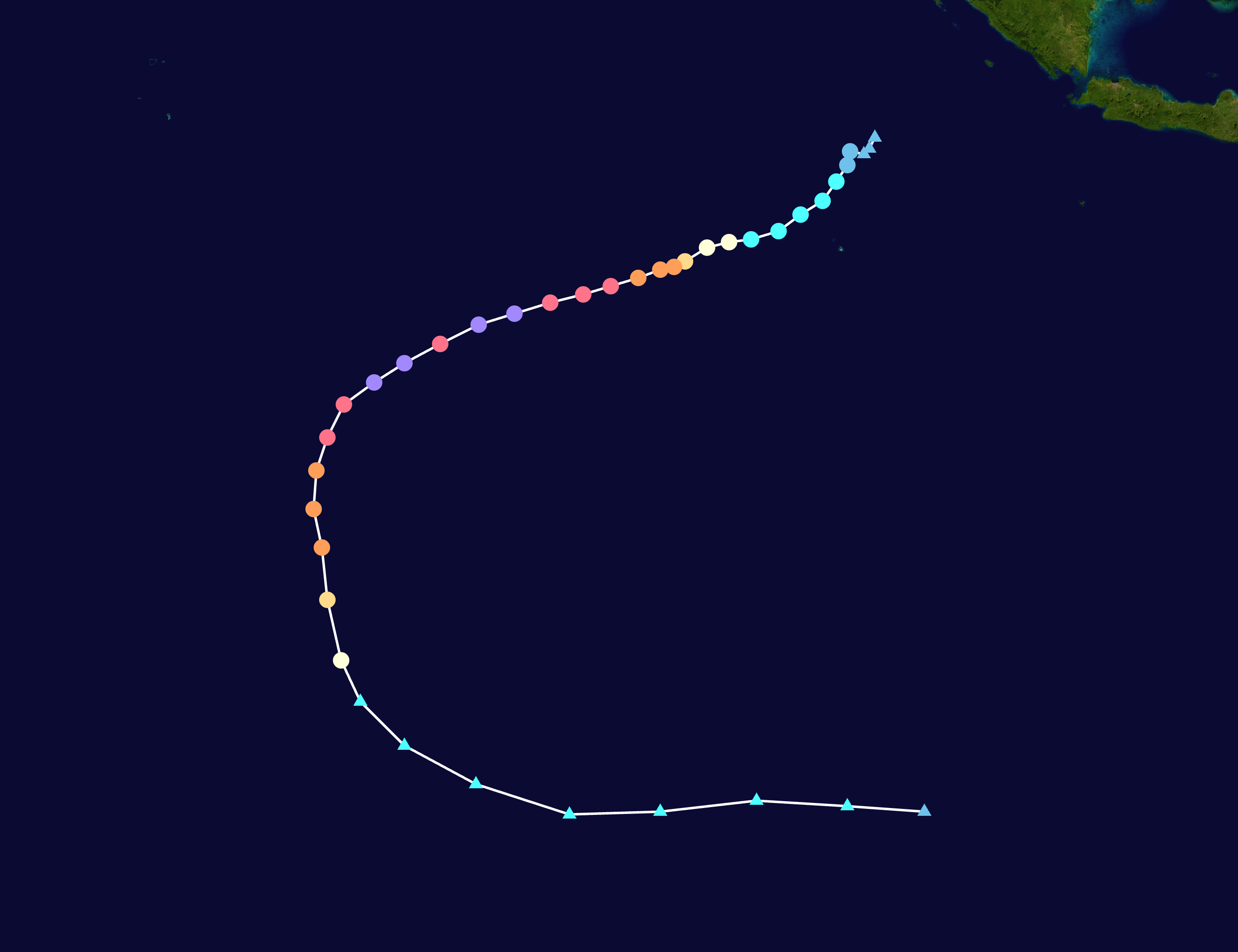
- Duration: December 20 (Entered basin) – December 23
- Peak intensity: 220 km/h (140 mph) (10-min); 920 hPa (mbar)

On December 16, a complex of disturbed weather near Indonesia was designated as a tropical low by the Australian Bureau of Meteorology. In an area of only moderate inhibiting atmospheric conditions, the low was able to steadily intensify, reaching tropical cyclone status on December 18 as it tracked southwestward. At 21:00 UTC on December 19, Bruce moved into the area of responsibility of Météo-France after crossing 90°E with maximum sustained winds of 155 km/h (95 mph). Upon passage into the southwest Indian Ocean Bruce already had a well-defined eye and further strengthening was anticipated. Six hours later the storm was upgraded to intense tropical cyclone status. At 1800 UTC that day, Météo-France upgraded the system to very intense tropical cyclone status, the highest rating possible on their tropical cyclone intensity scale. Over the next day, Bruce transiently weakened to intense tropical cyclone status, but later regained the maximum classification at 00:00 UTC on December 22. Consequently, Bruce reached its peak intensity with winds of 220 km/h (135 mph) and a minimum pressure of 920 mbar (hPa; 27.17 inHg).

Following peak intensity, Bruce began to steadily weaken as the storm's deep region of convection began to diminish. At 12:00 UTC on December 22, the storm was downgraded back to intense tropical cyclone status for a final time as it was becoming increasingly asymmetric. During the same timeframe Bruce began to curve around the western periphery of a nearby subtropical ridge, redirecting the cyclone's path towards the south. On December 23, the cyclone's eye finally succumbed to cooling sea surface temperatures and Bruce was downgraded to a low-end tropical cyclone by Météo-France. By the end of the day, Bruce was downgraded further to severe tropical storm intensity as the bulk of convection began to shear away from the low-level circulation center. Accelerating southeastwards, Bruce transitioned into an extratropical cyclone on December 24, ceasing Météo-France's monitoring operations. Its remnants exited the basin and re-entered the Australian region basin on December 25.

=== Intense Tropical Cyclone Bejisa ===
- Intense tropical cyclone (MFR)
- Category 4 tropical cyclone (SSHWS)
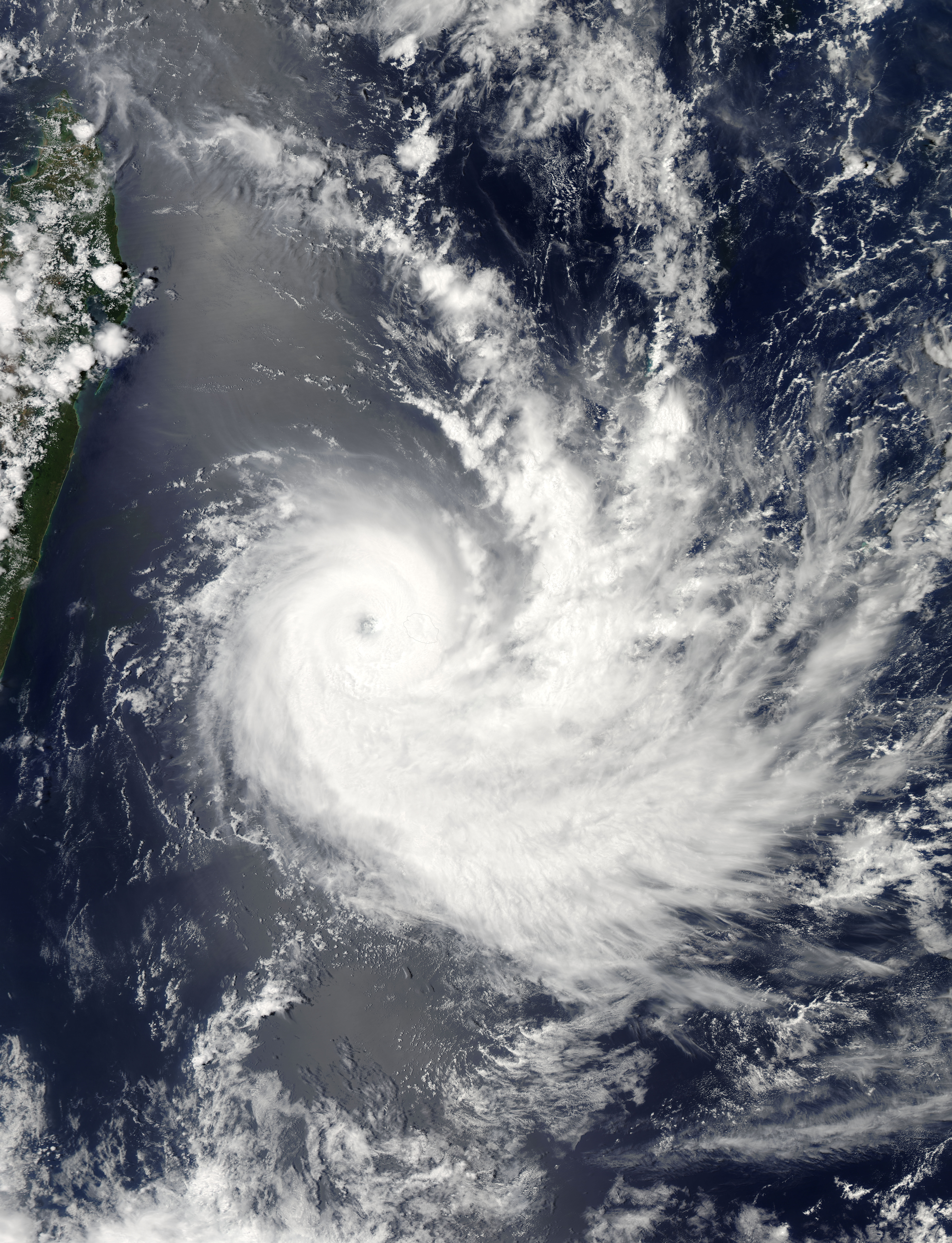
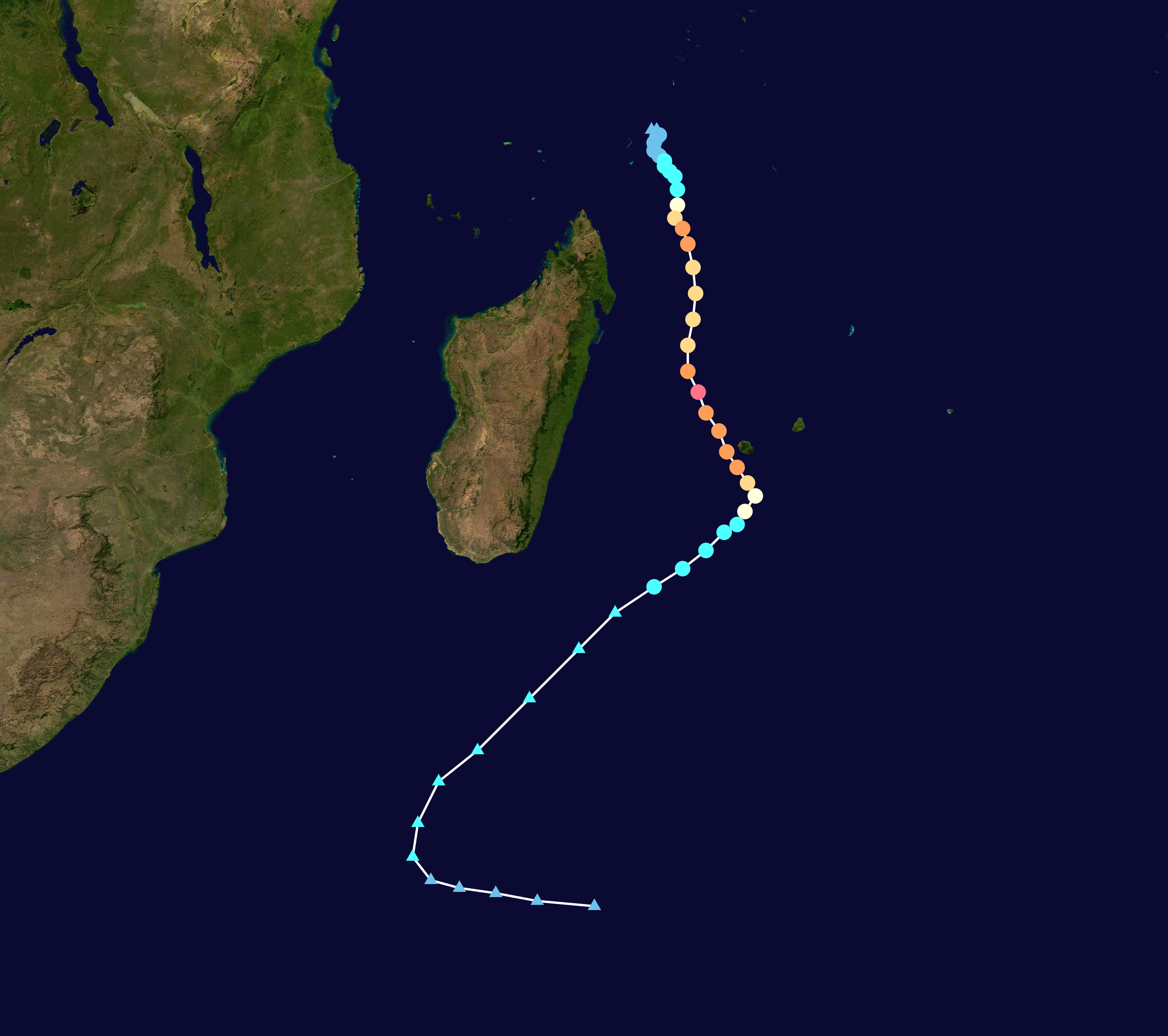
- Duration: December 27 – January 4
- Peak intensity: 175 km/h (110 mph) (10-min); 950 hPa (mbar)

In late December 2013, computer forecast models began to predict the development and cyclogenesis of a disturbance within the monsoon trough north of Madagascar. At 1800 UTC on December 27, the Joint Typhoon Warning Center (JTWC) noted a discrete area of disturbed weather approximately 1,350 km (840 mi) north-northwest of Réunion that corresponded with model forecasts and had the potential to develop. Accompanied by a low-level circulation center, the monitored storm complex developed rainbands about its southern periphery the following day. At 12:00 UTC on December 28, Météo-France deemed the system sufficiently organized to be considered a tropical disturbance, the fourth system to be given such a classification by the agency that season. Upon its designation, the disturbance was analyzed to have an unusually high barometric pressure, based on nearby weather station observations. Météo-France projected for the system to peak as a tropical cyclone before slightly weakening before impacting the Mascarene Islands.

Tracking southward, the disturbance steadily organized following December 28. As a result of wind shear, the system's low-level circulation centre remained partially exposed, though the shearing conditions were expected to lessen At 00:00 UTC on December 29, the disturbance was upgraded to a tropical depression. At 18:00 UTC that day, the depression intensified to moderate tropical storm intensity, thus receiving the name Bejisa by the Mauritius Meteorological Services. This coincided with the improving satellite appearance of the storm's central dense overcast. Intensification subsequently quickened, and at 06:00 UTC the next day Bejisa was considered to be a severe tropical storm. Concurrently a strengthening ridge in the mid-levels of the troposphere began to steer the storm towards the south-southeast. Following the development of a small pinhole eye, Bejisa was upgraded to tropical cyclone status at 12:00 UTC on December 30, followed by intense tropical cyclone status six hours thereafter. This intensification phase was short-lived, as an eyewall replacement cycle resulted in a slight deterioration and fluctuation of the storm's organization and structure.

=== Tropical Depression 05 ===
- Tropical depression (MFR)
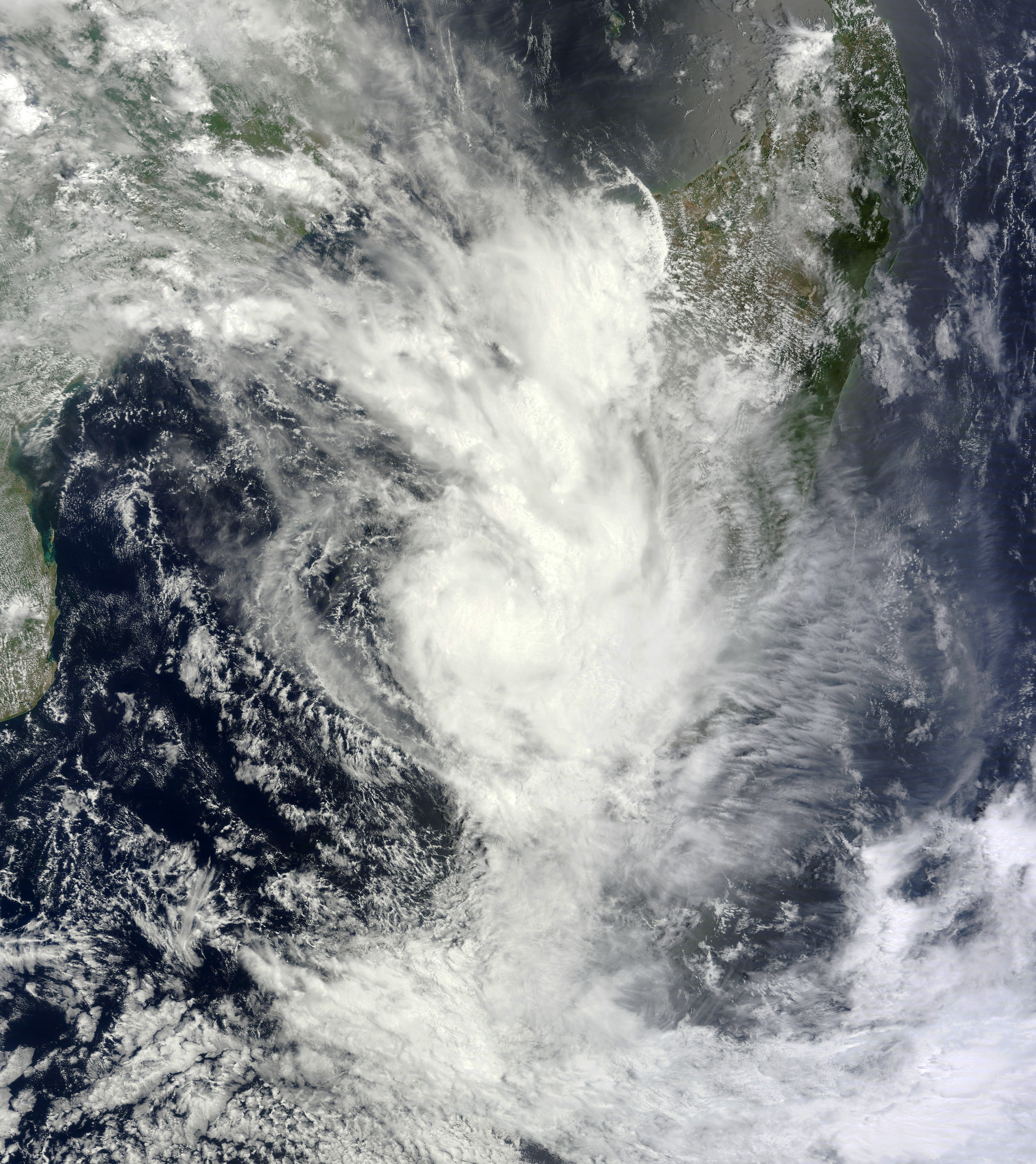
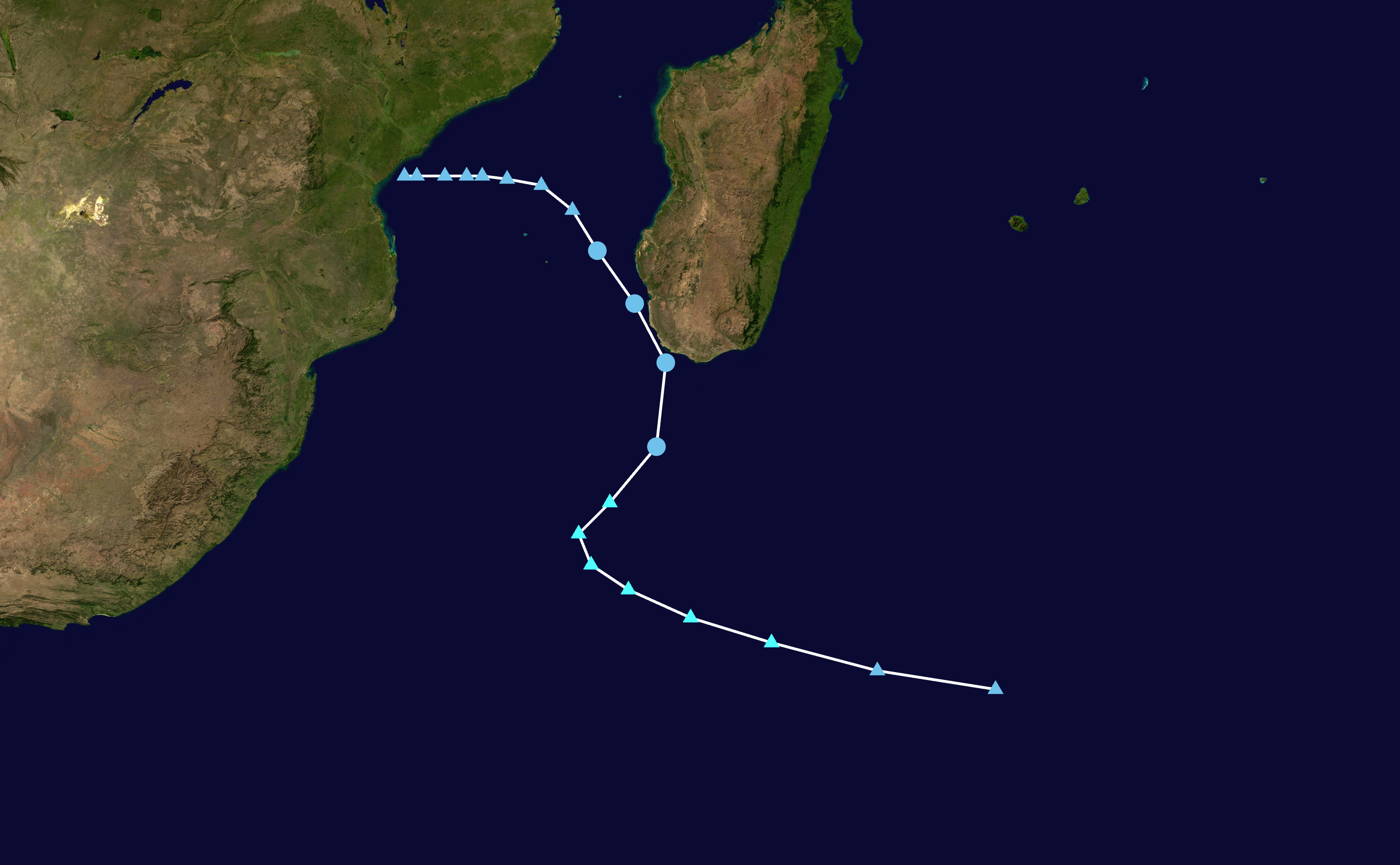
- Duration: January 7 – January 10
- Peak intensity: 55 km/h (35 mph) (10-min); 997 hPa (mbar)

The initial development of the season's fifth tropical depression was quickly paced. The JTWC first began monitoring the system in its advisories at 18:00 UTC on January 7, while the area of disturbed weather was within the Mozambique Channel. By that time, a well-defined low-level circulation center had already developed, and computer models indicated that tropical cyclogenesis was a likely probability due to the storm's expected track within a favorable atmospheric environment. At 12:00 UTC on January 8, Météo-France classified the system as a zone of disturbed weather, though at the time the storm's convective activity was intermittent. Shortly after designation the system developed, albeit shallow, convective banding. At 06:00 UTC the following day, the zone of disturbed weather was upgraded to tropical depression status while just off the west coast of Madagascar.

Forecasts early in the depression's history indicated that heavy rainfall was likely in areas of southwestern Madagascar, though these rains would come during an extended period of abnormally dry weather. As a result, the Madagascar National Bureau for Risk and Disaster Management issued a red alert, signifying imminent heavy rain, for five Malagasy districts and a yellow alert, signifying a threat of heavy rain, in seven districts. In Morondava, 205 people were evacuated to safe havens where authorities provided food.

=== Intense Tropical Cyclone Colin ===
- Intense tropical cyclone (MFR)
- Category 4 tropical cyclone (SSHWS)
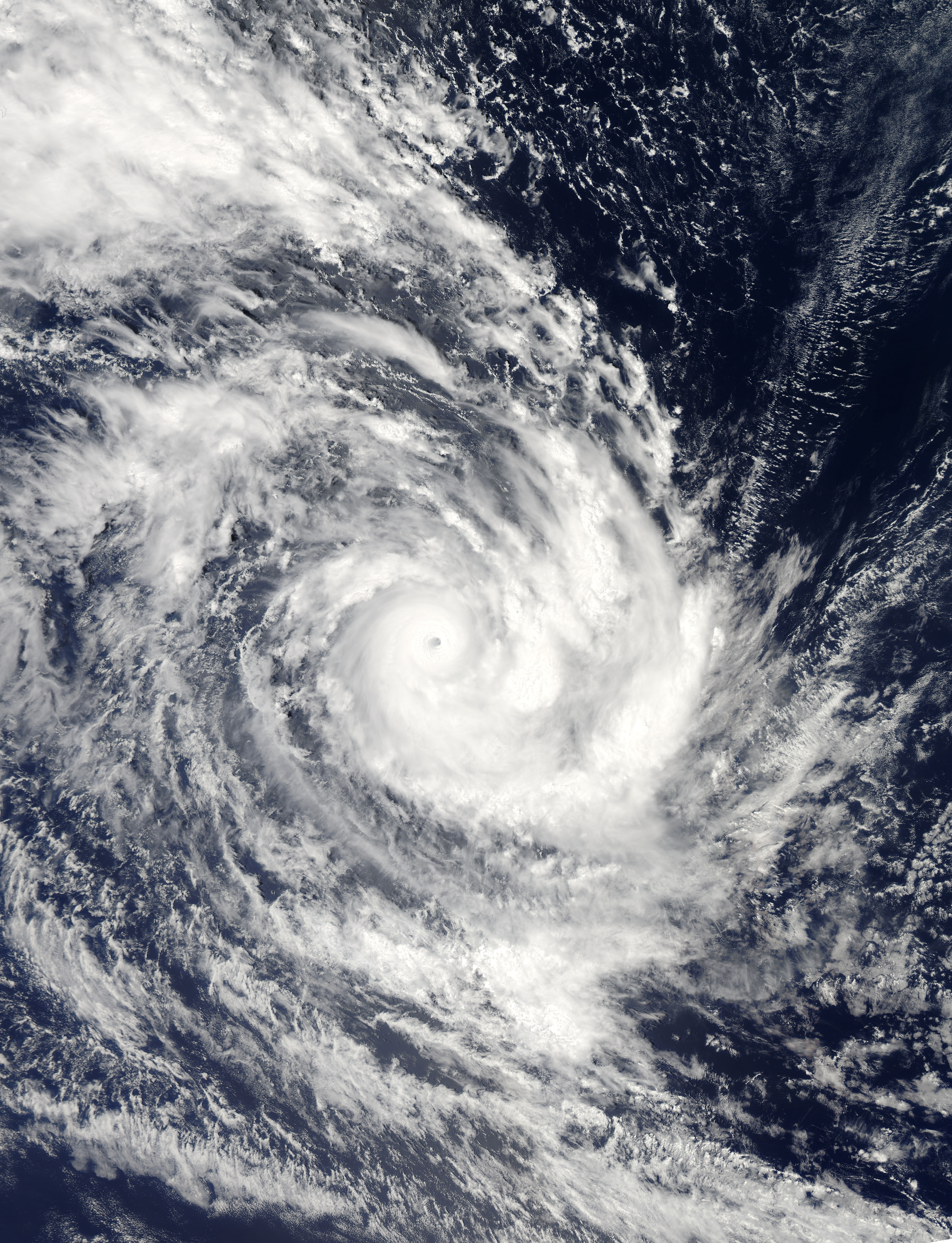
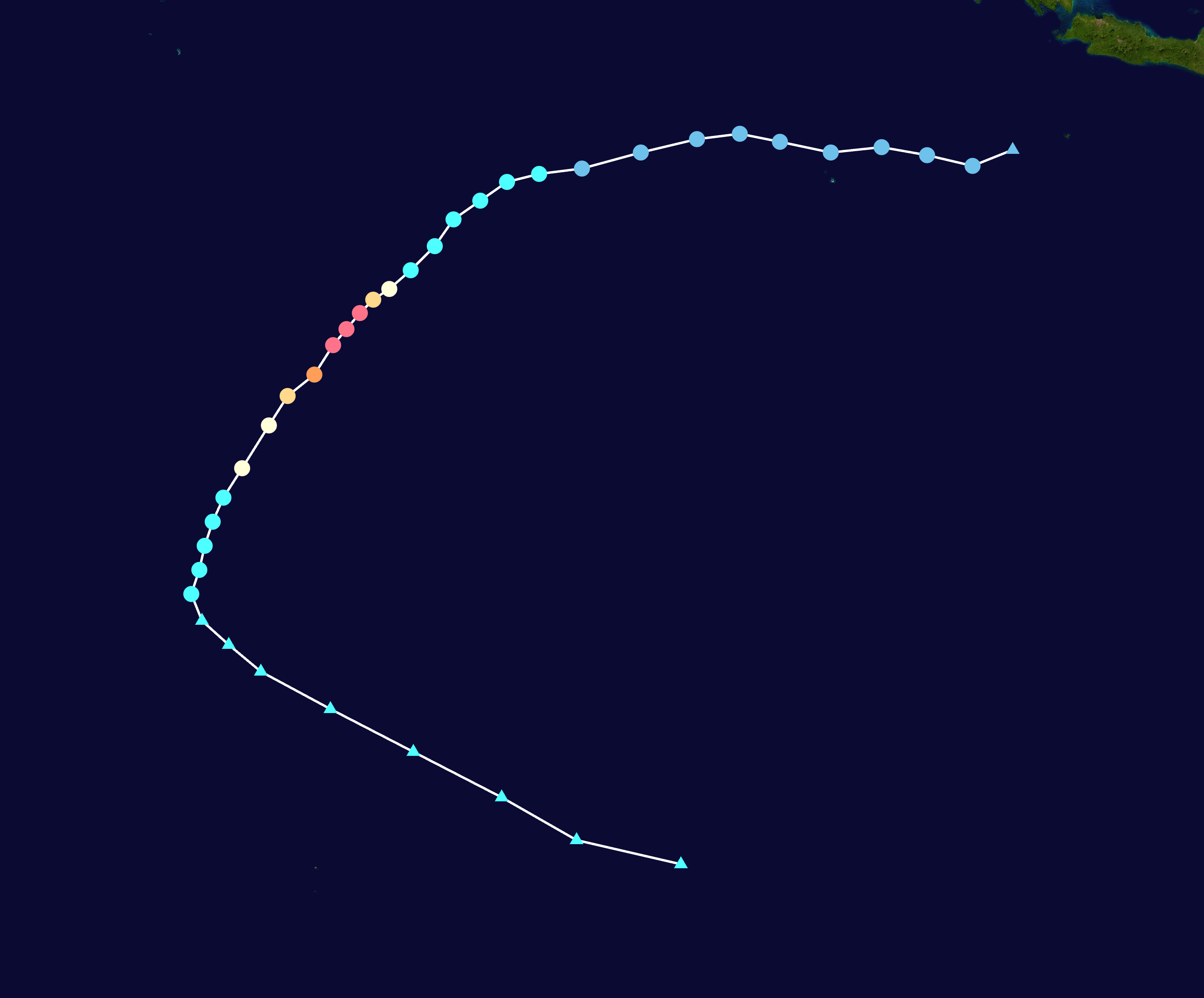
- Duration: January 9 (Entered basin) – January 14
- Peak intensity: 205 km/h (125 mph) (10-min); 915 hPa (mbar)

A tropical low in the Australian region basin formed on January 6, which was about 450 km (280 mi) east-northeast of Christmas Island. Over the next days the system moved rapidly westwards and entered the Southwest Indian Ocean during the morning of January 9. Despite being under significant wind shear, the system managed to organize a low level eye which was detectable in microwave imagery. As a result, the storm was upgraded to moderate tropical storm strength and named Colin the next day. On January 11 shear let up, allowing Colin favourable conditions for strengthening. Tracking southwest, Colin rapidly intensified much faster than initial predictions expected into an intense tropical cyclone during the succeeding 24 hours. Six hours later on January 12, Colin had reached its peak intensity of 185 km/h (115 mph). Just like cyclones Amara and Bruce, Colin had undergone rapid deepening. But by January 13, Colin's eyewall had become severely eroded and the system was downgraded to a severe tropical storm. As it tracked further into cooler waters, the storm weakened to tropical storm strength early on January 14 and made a turn to the southeast. Environmental conditions continued to become unfavourable and the storm transitioned into an extratropical cyclone on January 15.

=== Moderate Tropical Storm Deliwe ===
- Moderate tropical storm (MFR)
- Tropical storm (SSHWS)
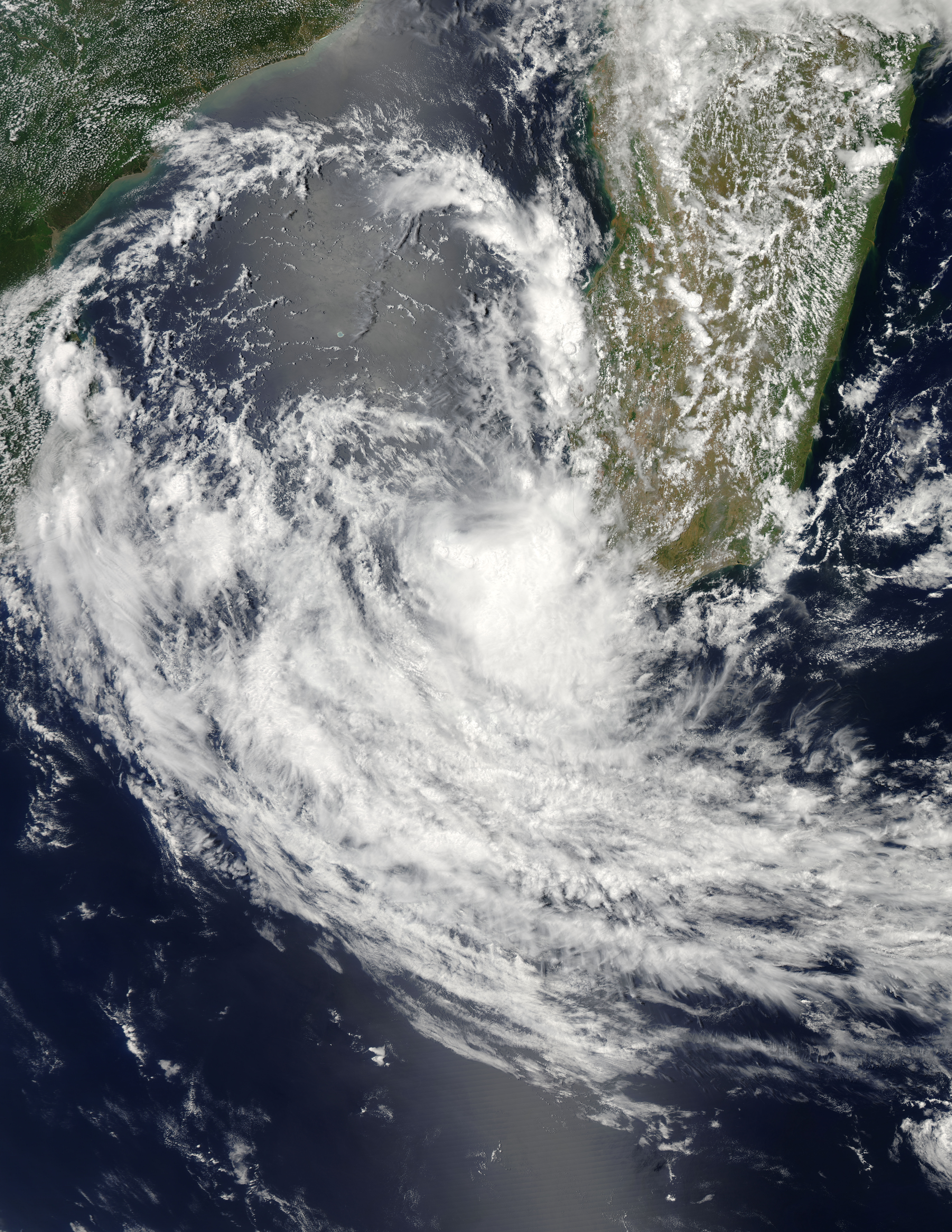
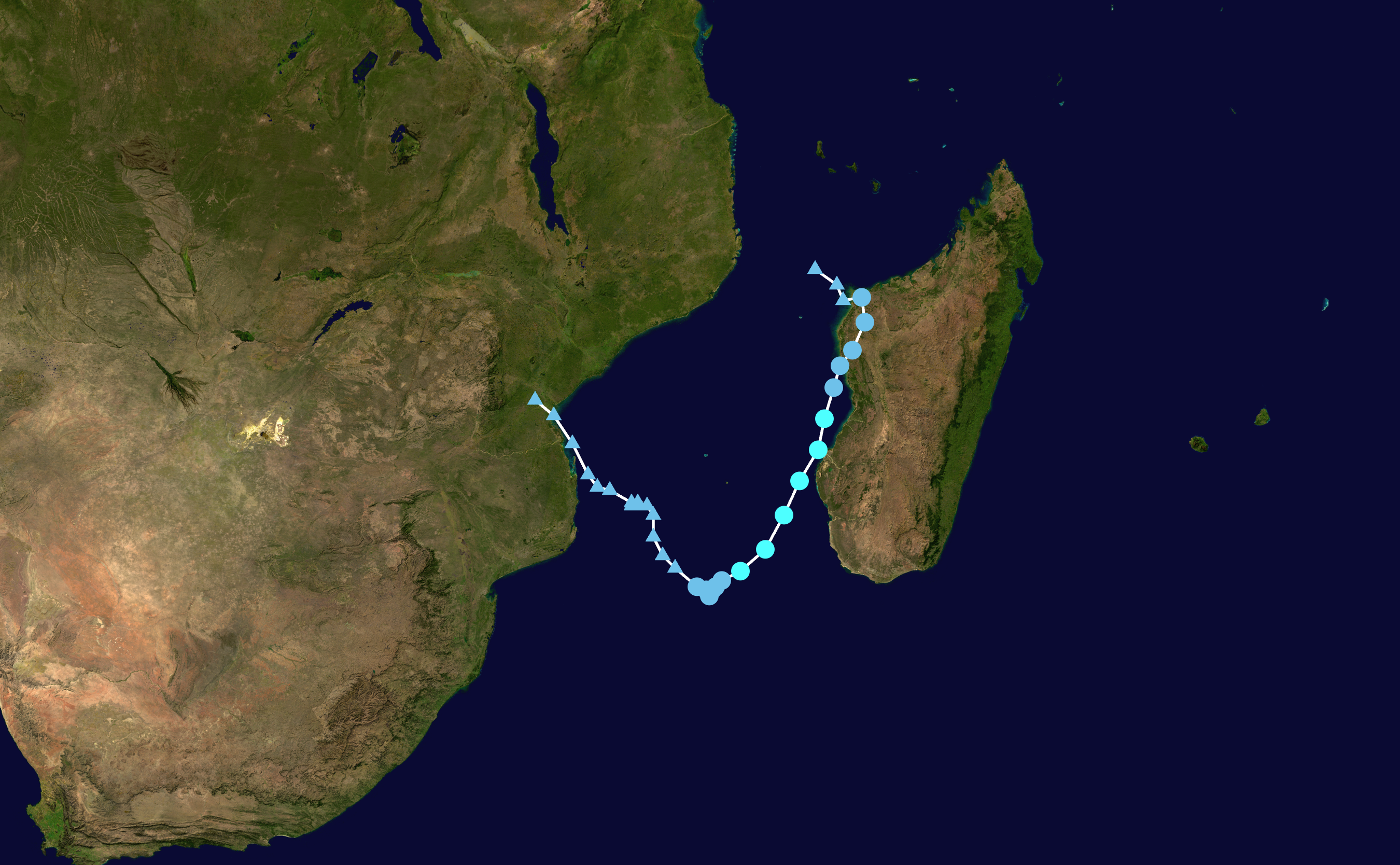
- Duration: January 14 – January 22
- Peak intensity: 85 km/h (50 mph) (10-min); 990 hPa (mbar)

An area of convection accompanied by a broad circulation was first noted within a region of moderate wind shear by the Joint Typhoon Warning Center early on January 15. It was located for the most part over land, and it drifted out into the Mozambique Channel during the same day. On January 16, the small system tracked south-southwest and was designated by MFR as Tropical Disturbance 7. Shortly thereafter, JTWC declared it as Tropical Cyclone 09S. At 1800z, Météo-France noted that the system was maintaining a tight curved band pattern and the Madagascar Meteorological Service named the storm Deliwe. Throughout the next 24 hours, Deliwe managed to persist as a moderate tropical storm while it moved away from the Madagascar coast, but increasing shear associated with an upper-level trough weakened the storm back to a tropical depression. Deliwe turned west and convection sheared away to the south, exposing the low-level circulation center, but the storm maintained a small region of gale-force winds for a brief period after Réunion issued their last advisory on the system. The remnants of Deliwe turned back to the north, dissipating as they approached Mozambique.

Deliwe produced heavy rains in the Melaky region of Madagascar and caused significant flooding, resulting in at least two fatalities. Additionally, one person went missing after being swept away by the swollen Mahajamba River in Mitsinjo. In Mahajanga, rising waters left 463 people homeless. Strong wind gusts caused some damage, most notably the roof of a school in Soalala, Boeny, was blown off.

=== Zone of Disturbed Weather 08 ===
- Zone of disturbed weather (MFR)
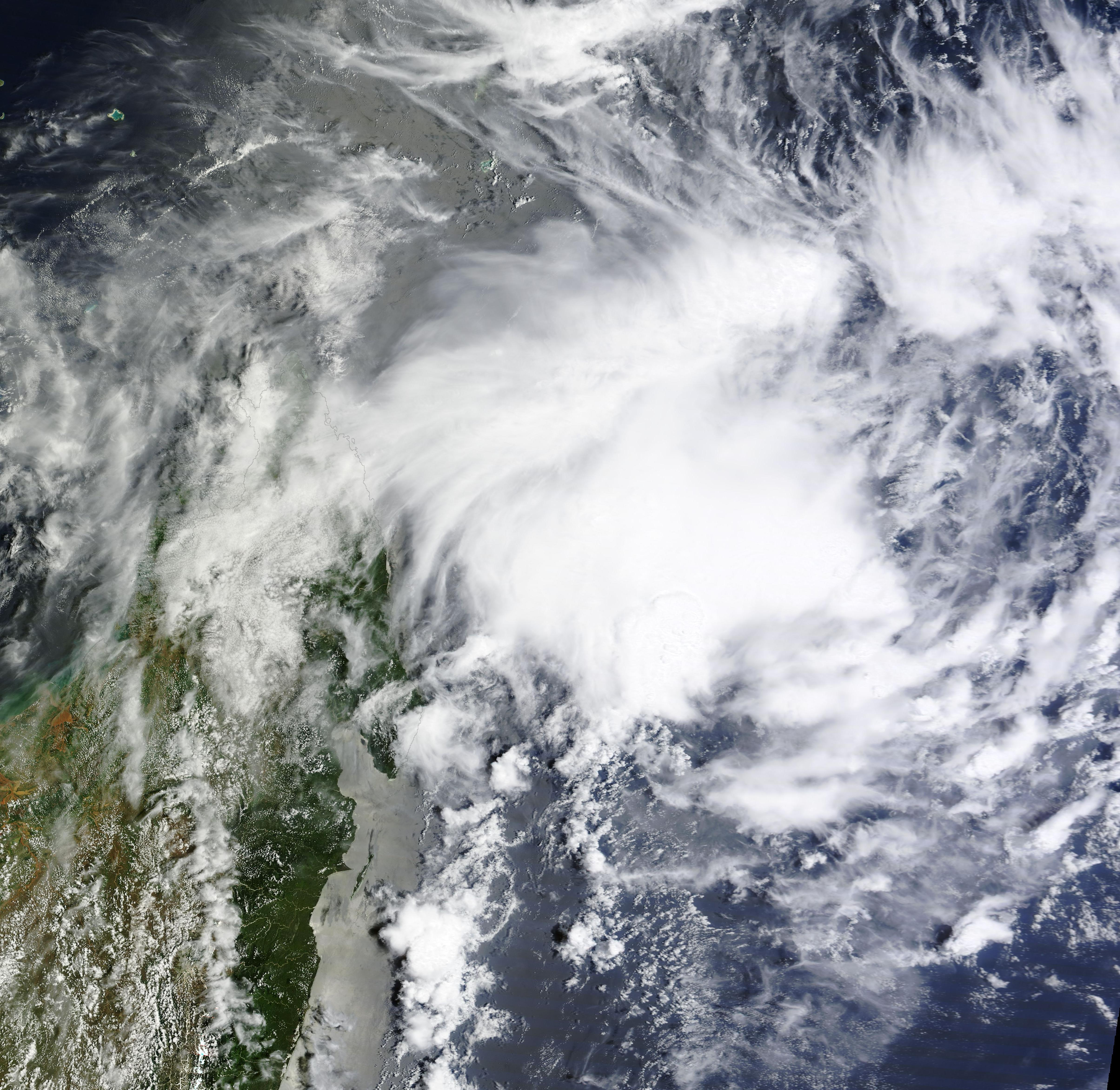
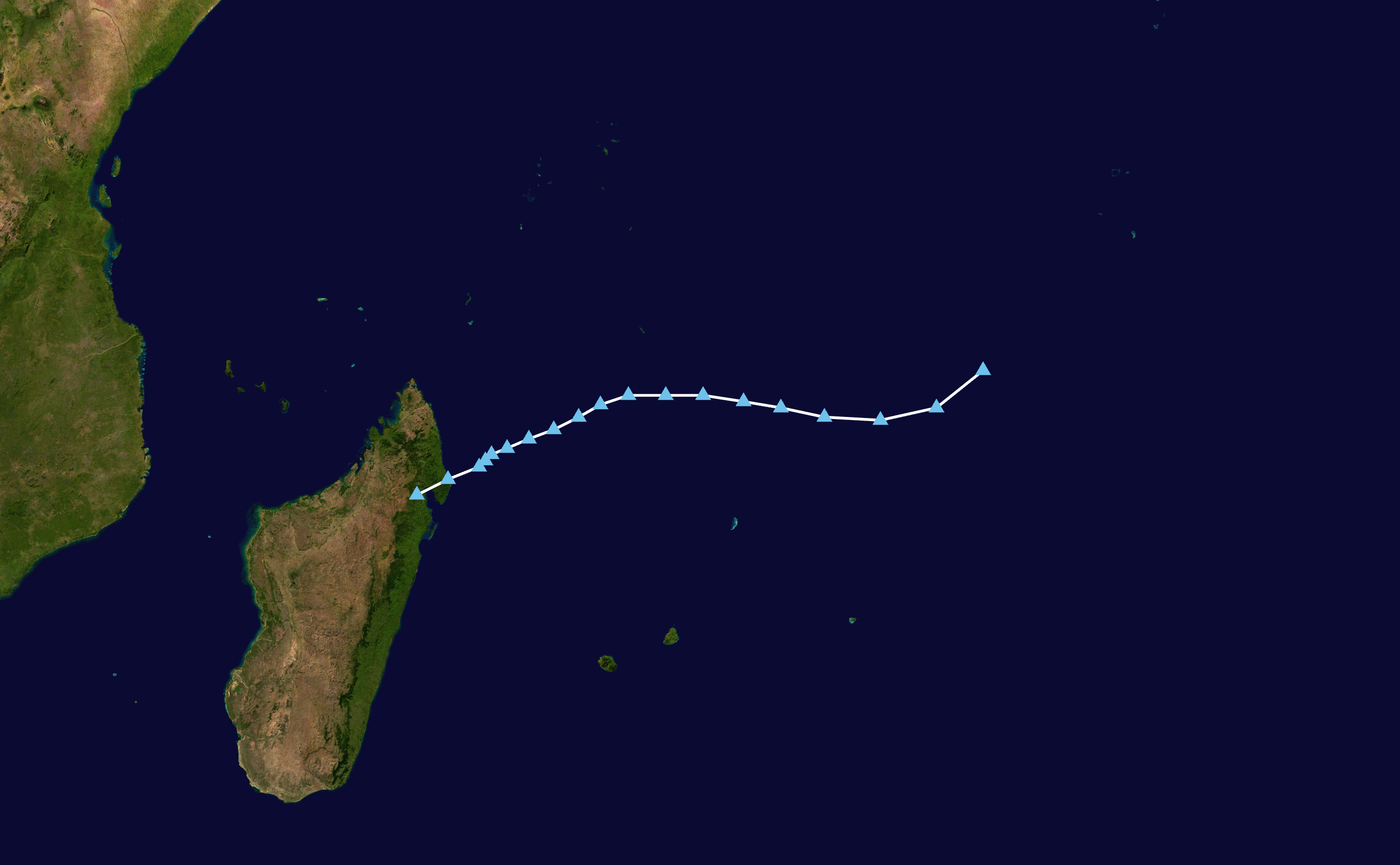
- Duration: January 16 – January 20
- Peak intensity: 35 km/h (25 mph) (10-min); 1004 hPa (mbar)

A broad of low-pressure formed east-northeast of Madagascar late on January 16. Due to warm waters, it intensified into Zone of Disturbed Weather 08 early on January 18. The system degenerated to a remnant low about 12 hours later, due to cool waters and vertical windshear. Early on January 21, the remnants of the system fully dissipated, after making landfall on Madagascar.

=== Tropical Disturbance 09 ===
- Tropical disturbance (MFR)
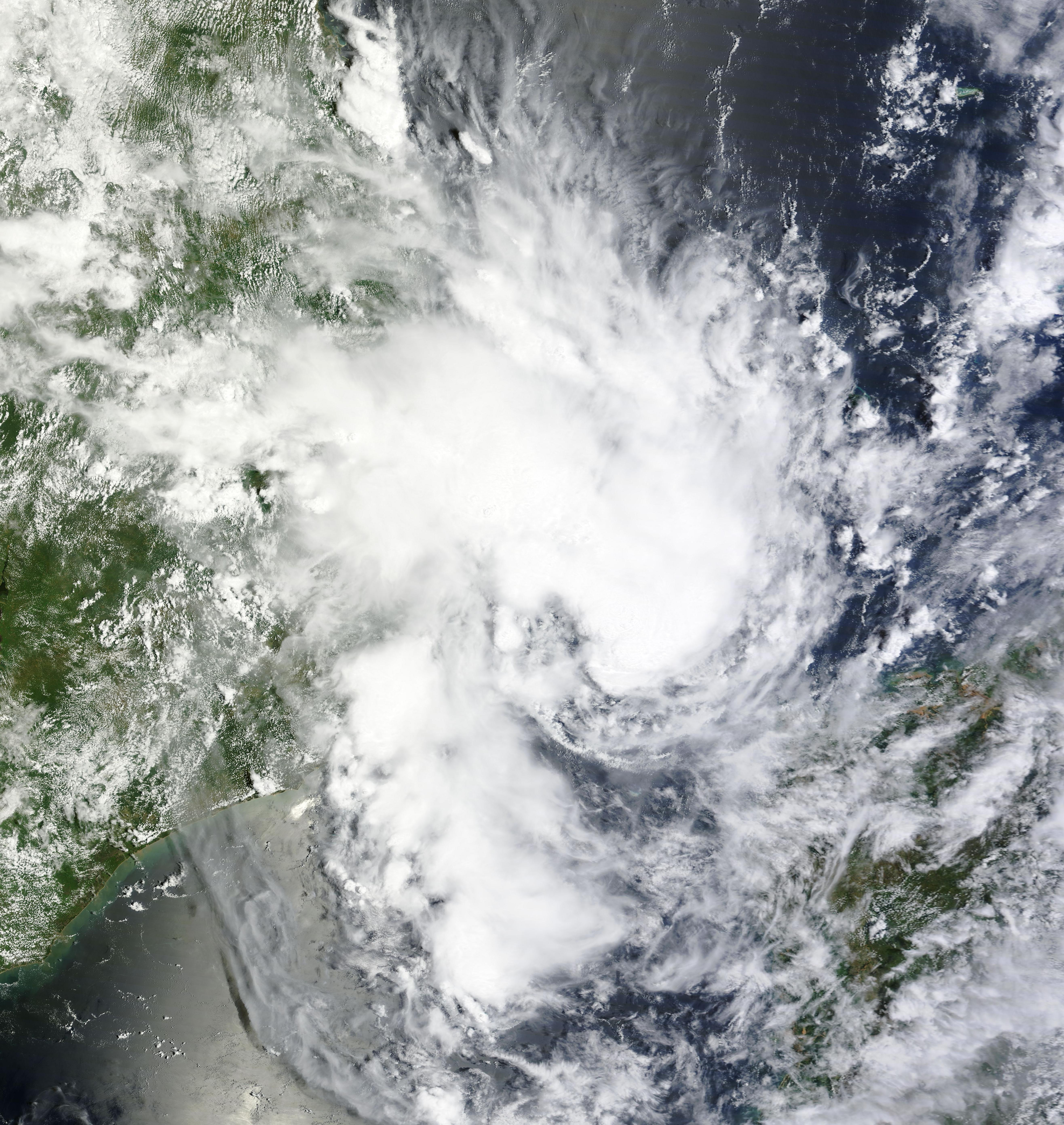
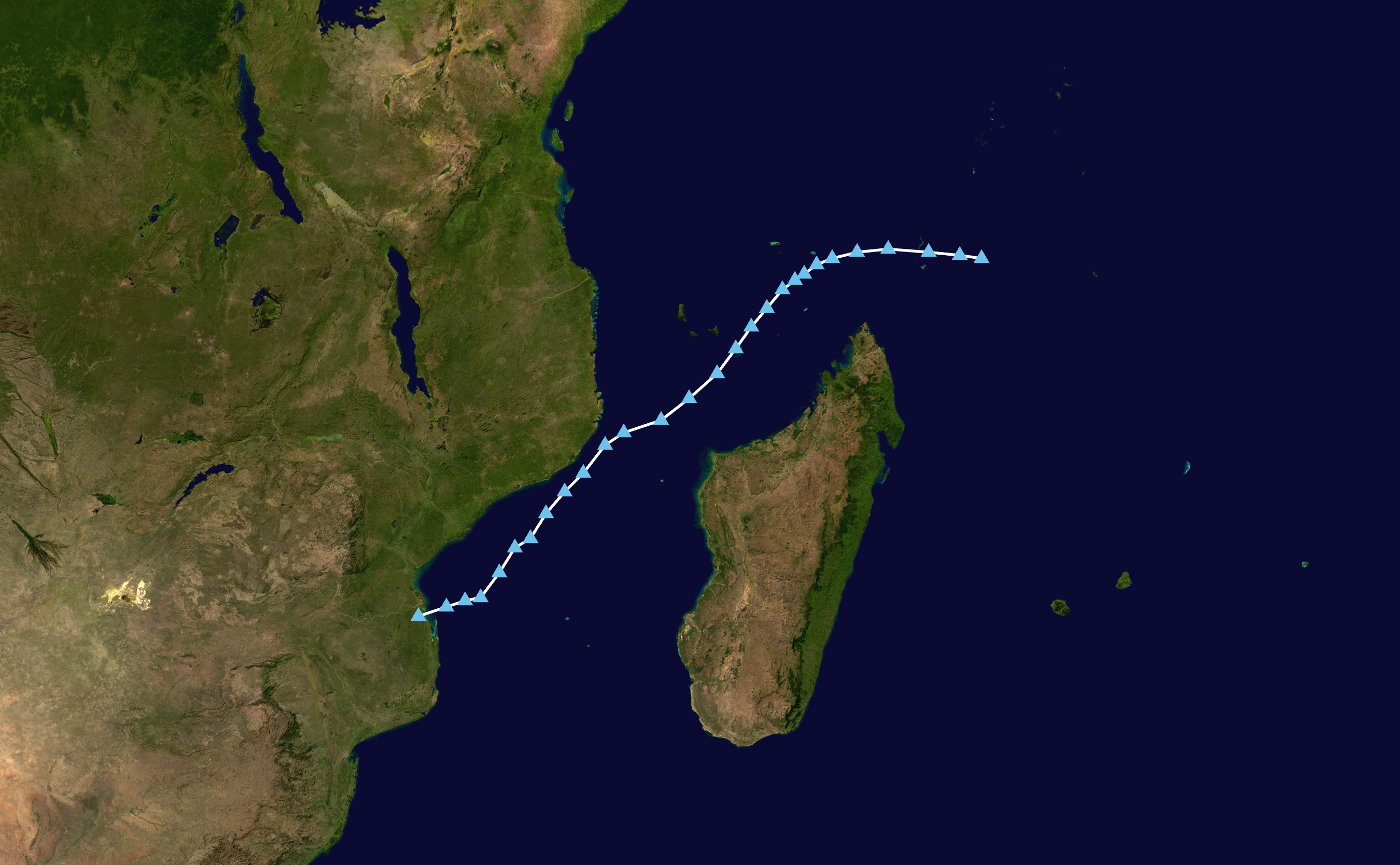
- Duration: January 24 – January 31
- Peak intensity: 45 km/h (30 mph) (10-min); 1002 hPa (mbar)

=== Severe Tropical Storm Edilson ===
- Severe tropical storm (MFR)
- Tropical storm (SSHWS)
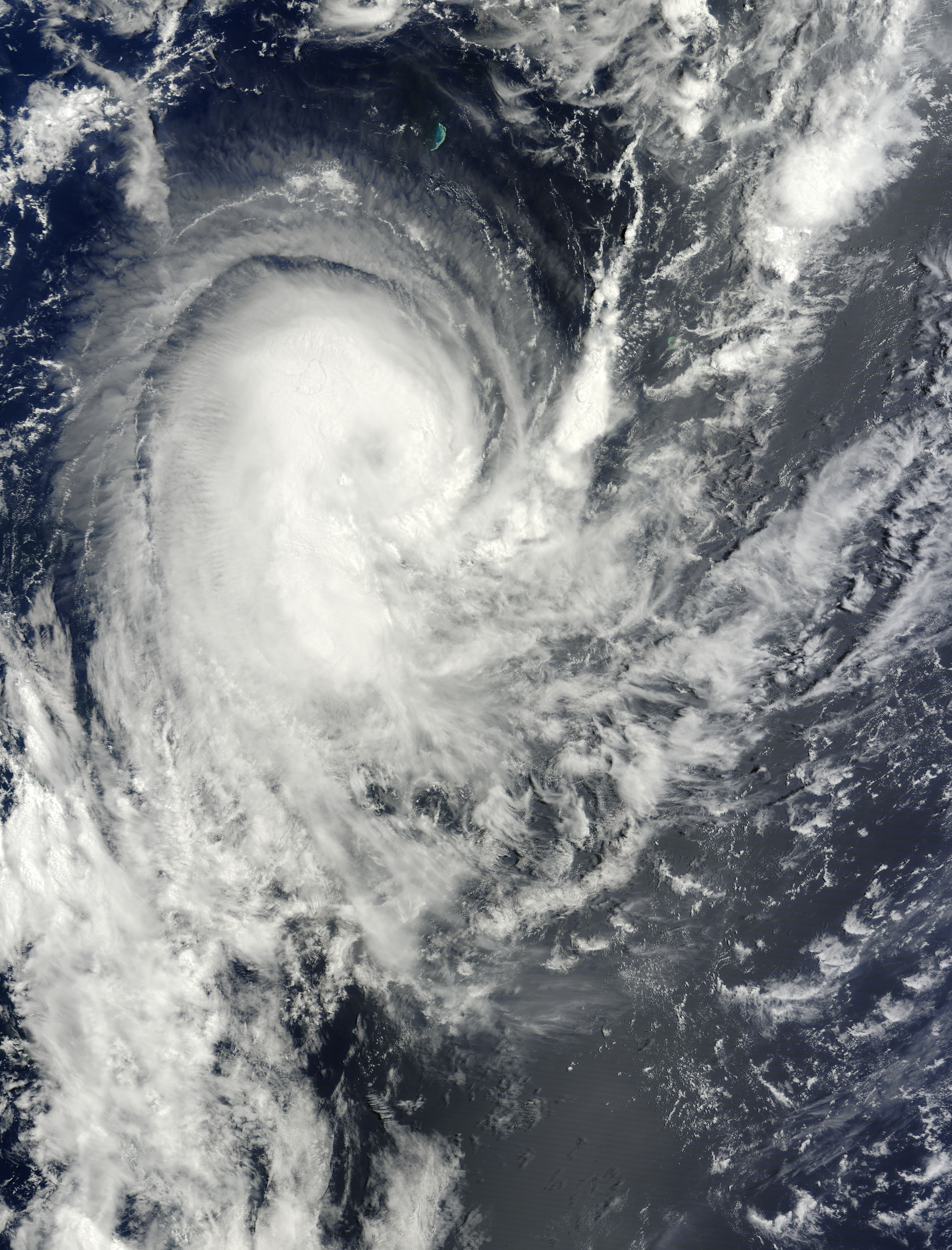
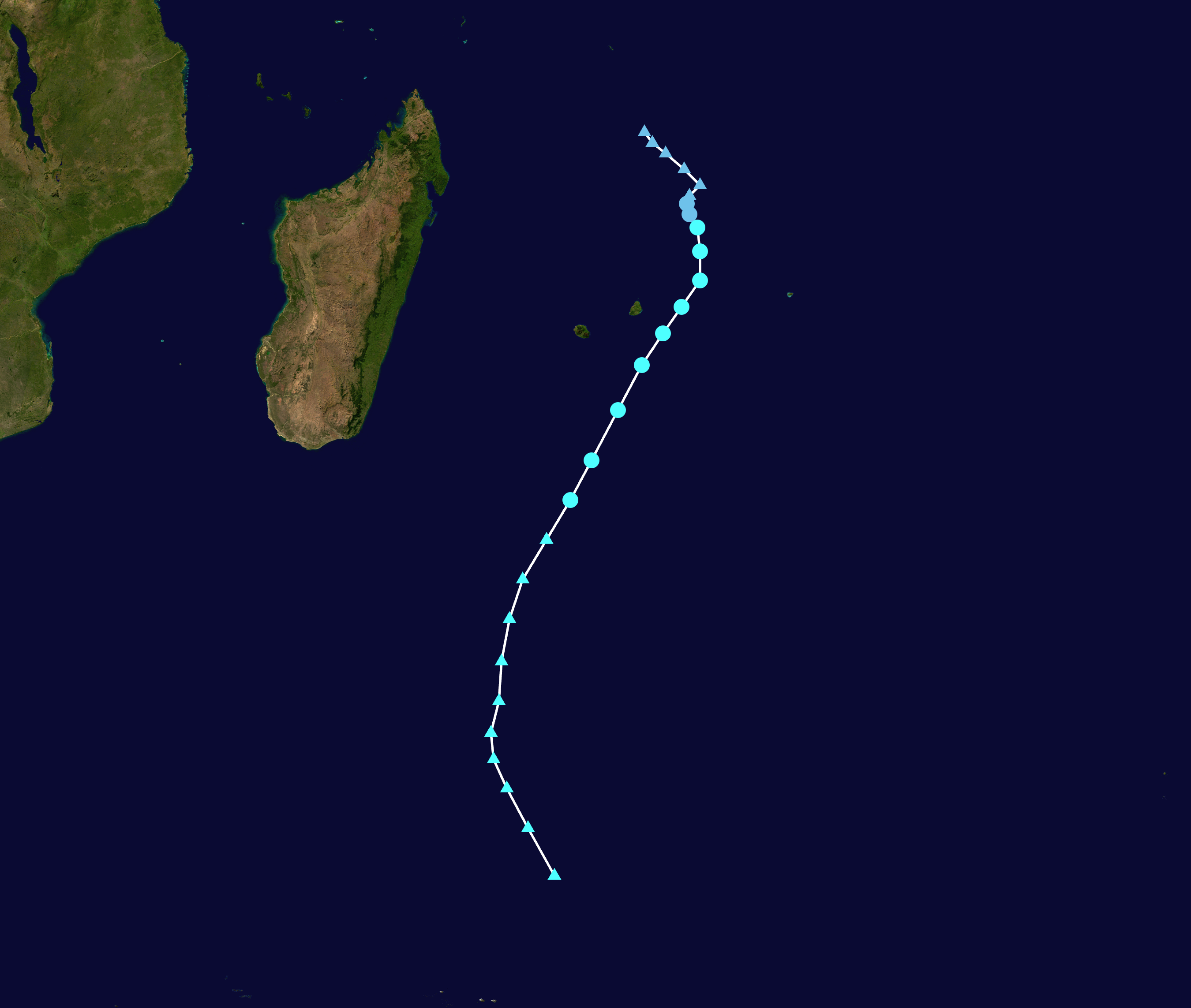
- Duration: February 3 – February 7
- Peak intensity: 105 km/h (65 mph) (10-min); 978 hPa (mbar)

Less than one week since the last disturbance dissipated, another disturbance formed on February 3. Late on February 4, the MFR and JTWC upgraded it to Moderate Tropical Storm Edilson. The next day, the storm affected the Mauritius with very heavy rainfall. Damage on the island was 1 billion rupee (US$32.5 million).

=== Severe Tropical Storm Fobane ===
- Severe tropical storm (MFR)
- Tropical storm (SSHWS)
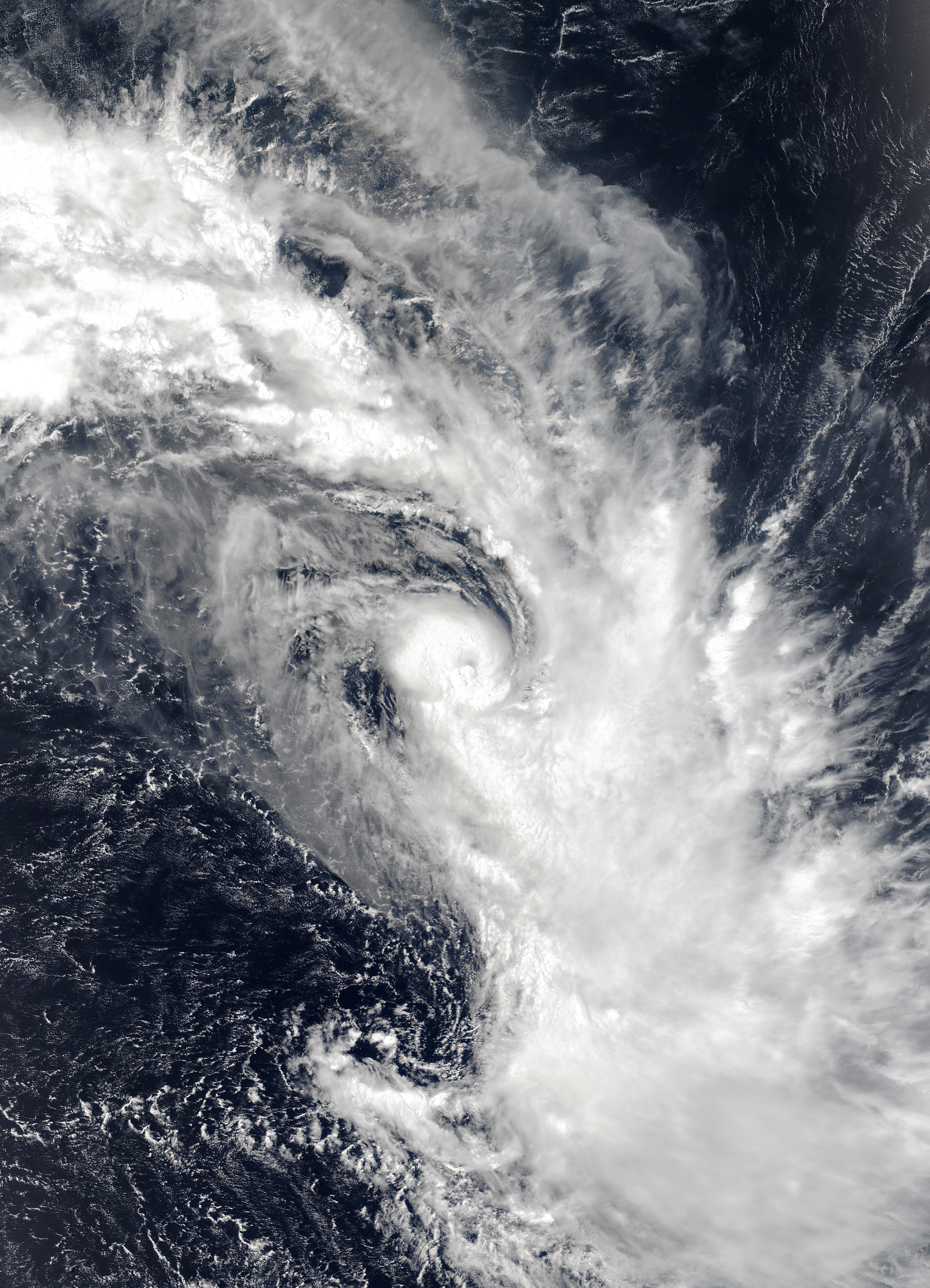
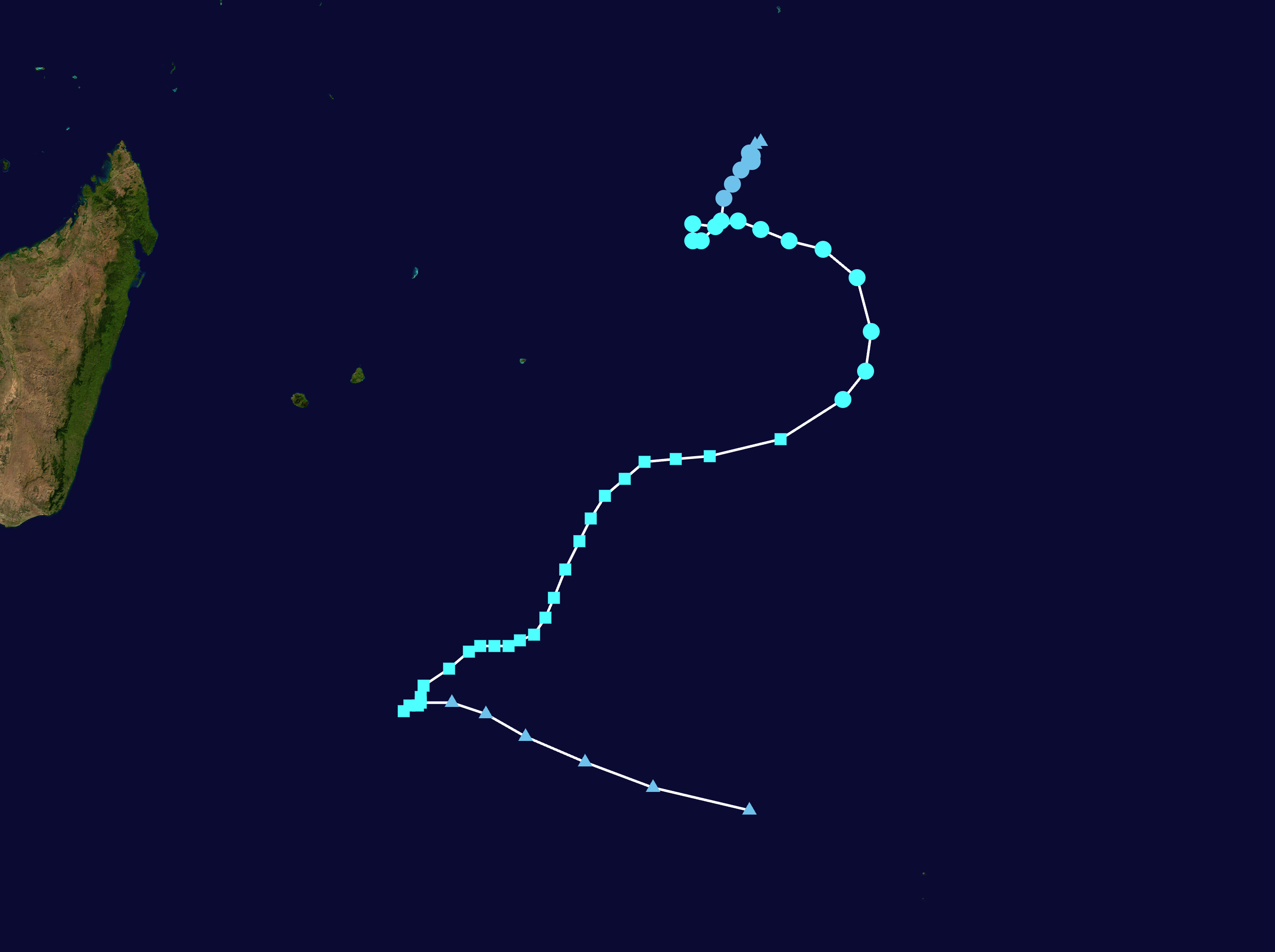
- Duration: February 5 – February 16
- Peak intensity: 110 km/h (70 mph) (10-min); 975 hPa (mbar)

As Severe Tropical Storm Edilson reached peak intensity, a tropical depression formed to its northeast. It was upgraded into Tropical Depression 11 by Météo-France, and it rapidly intensified into Severe Tropical Storm Fobane by February 8. Throughout February 9, Fobane rapidly accelerated to the south and curved to the east. The storm interacted with an upper-level trough and low oceanic heat content, altering its structure. At noon on February 10, Météo-France declared that Fobane had transitioned into a hybrid but warm-core cyclone, meriting the classification of subtropical depression. Convection rapidly formed coinciding with a 10 millibar drop on February 11 and Fobane reached peak intensity during the next day while subtropical. In the following days, Fobane turned south and then west, slowing down as a new ridge of high pressure built up to its west. The storm continued into cooler waters and became extratropical on February 14.

=== Severe Tropical Storm Guito ===
- Severe tropical storm (MFR)
- Category 1 tropical cyclone (SSHWS)
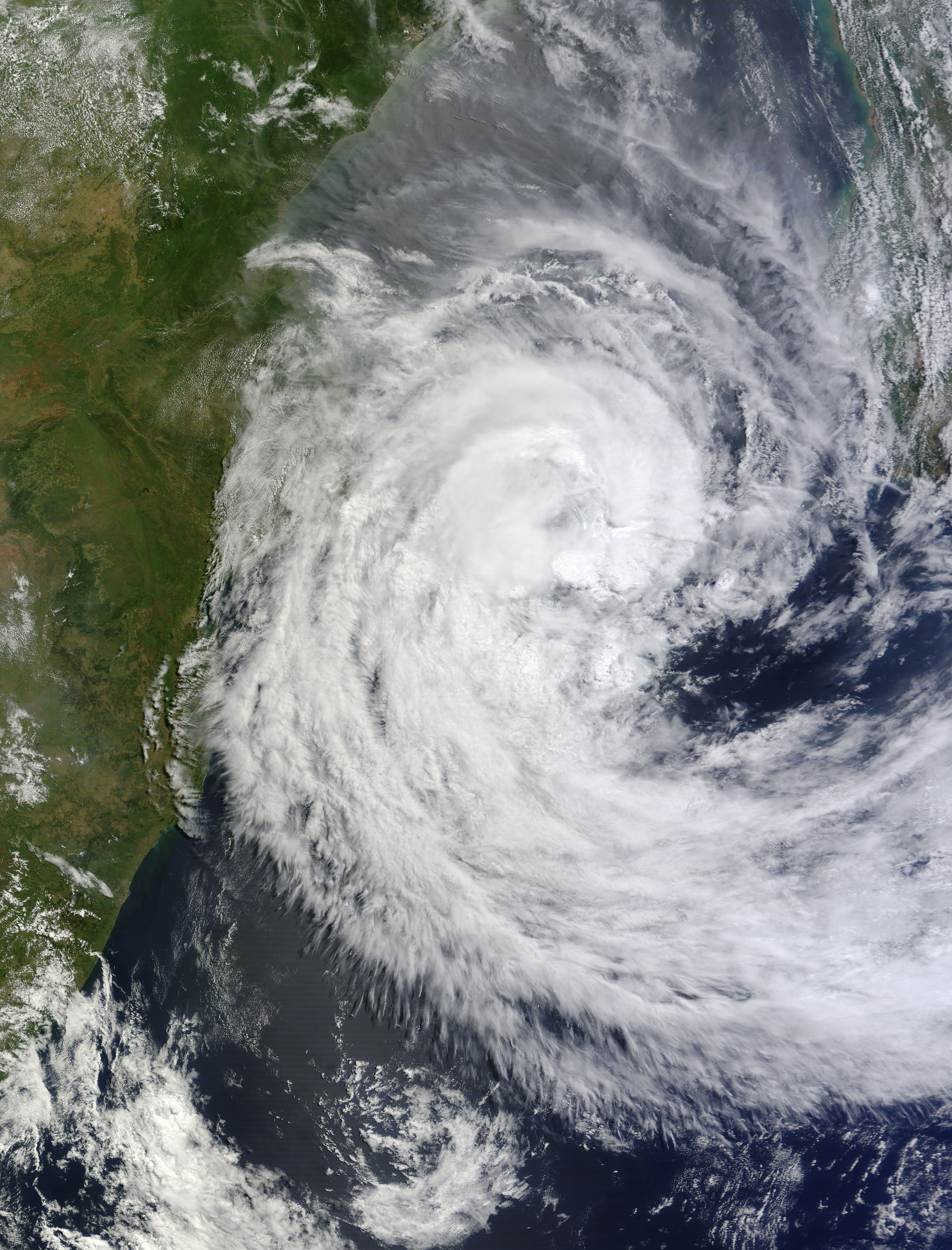
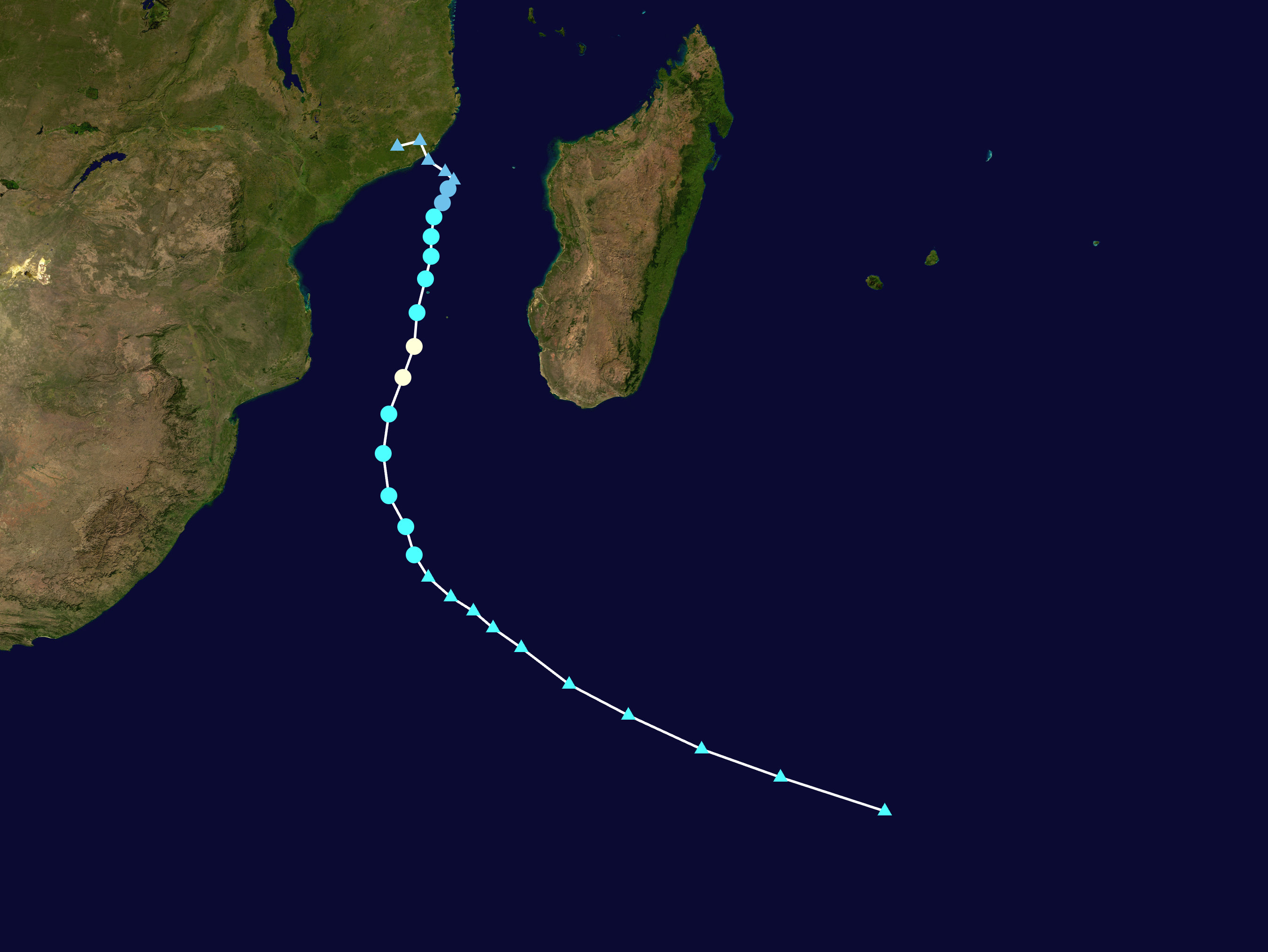
- Duration: February 17 – February 21
- Peak intensity: 110 km/h (70 mph) (10-min); 980 hPa (mbar)

An area of convection over eastern Mozambique moved into the Mozambique Channel and was designated a Tropical Disturbance on February 18. Later that day, the JTWC gave the designation of 15S. It steadily intensified into Severe Tropical Storm Guito on February 18. The next day, Guito intensified into a Category 1 tropical cyclone and a ragged eye formed.

=== Subtropical Depression 13 ===
- Subtropical depression (MFR)
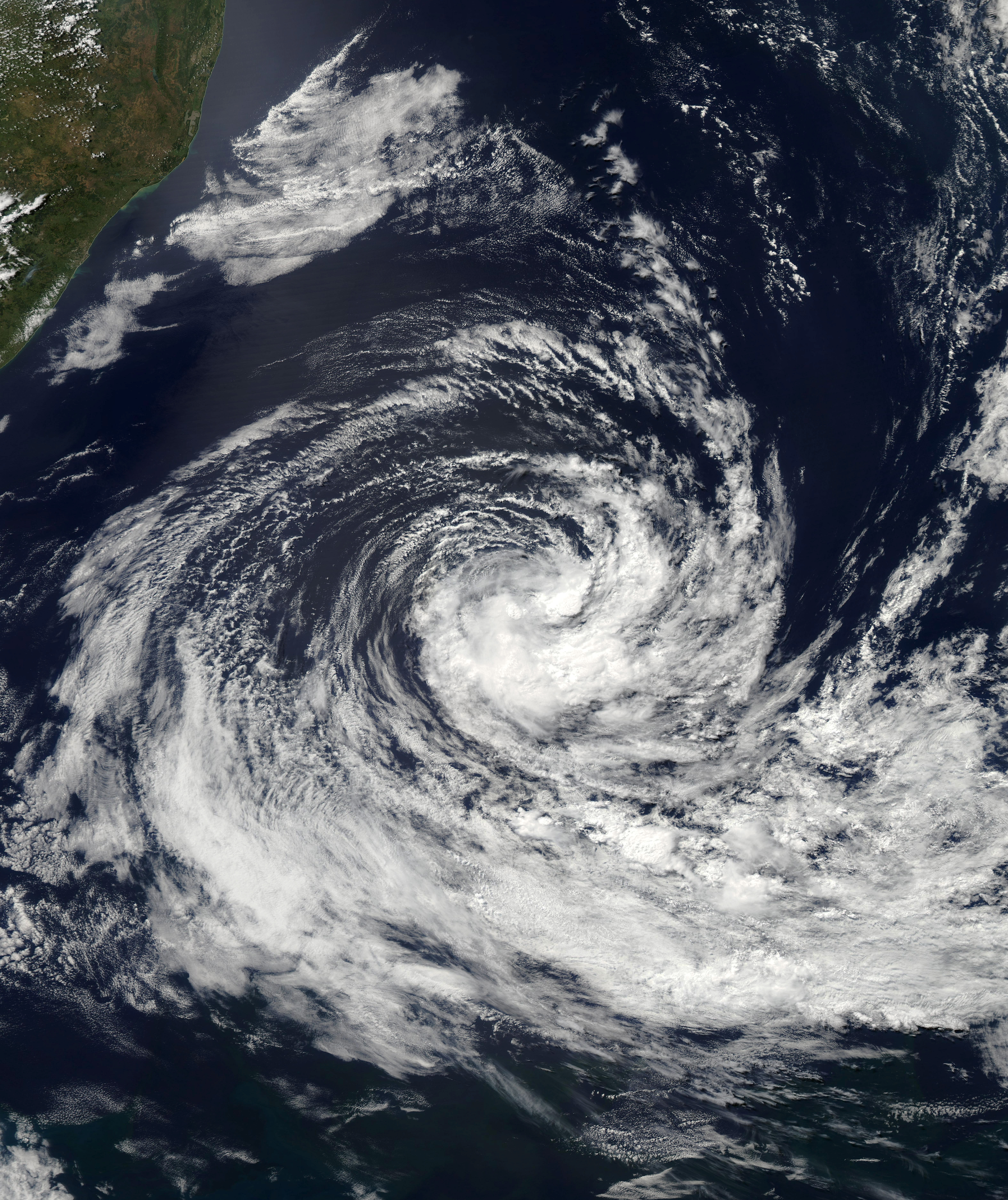
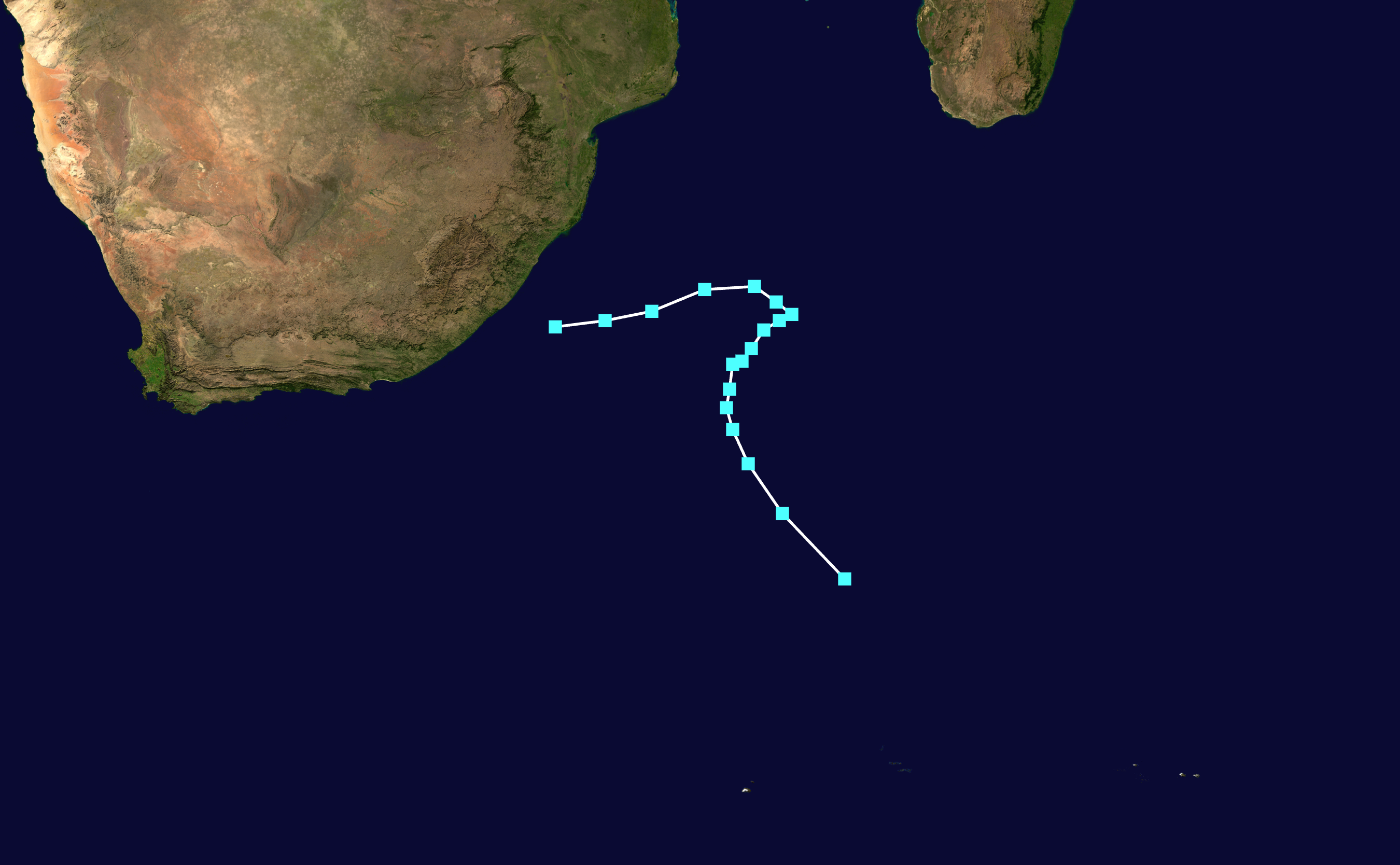
- Duration: February 25 – March 1
- Peak intensity: 75 km/h (45 mph) (10-min); 993 hPa (mbar)

On February 27, RSMC La Réunion reported that a subtropical depression had formed 725 km (450 mi) southeast of Durban, South Africa.

=== Very Intense Tropical Cyclone Hellen ===
- Very intense tropical cyclone (MFR)
- Category 4 tropical cyclone (SSHWS)
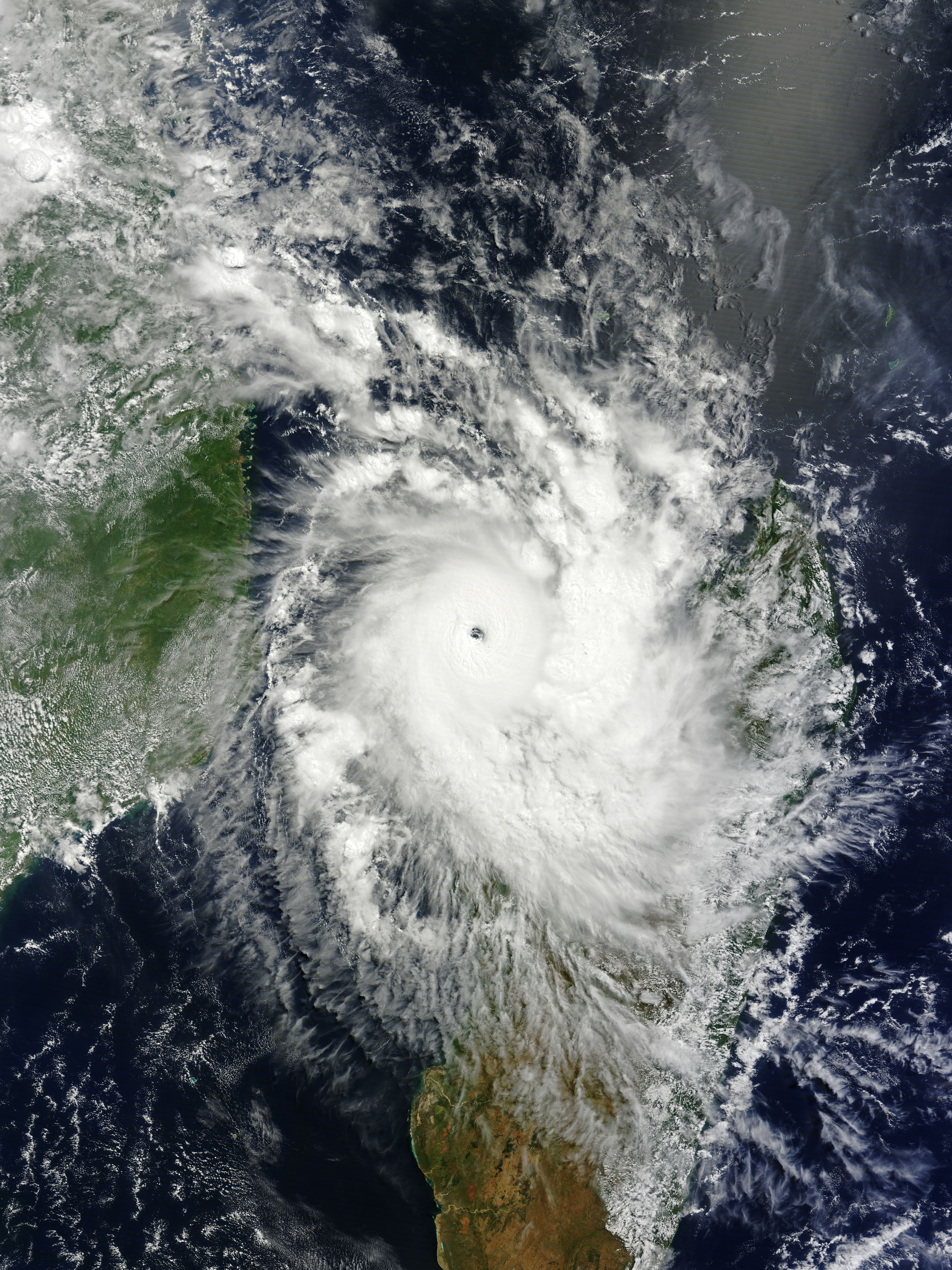
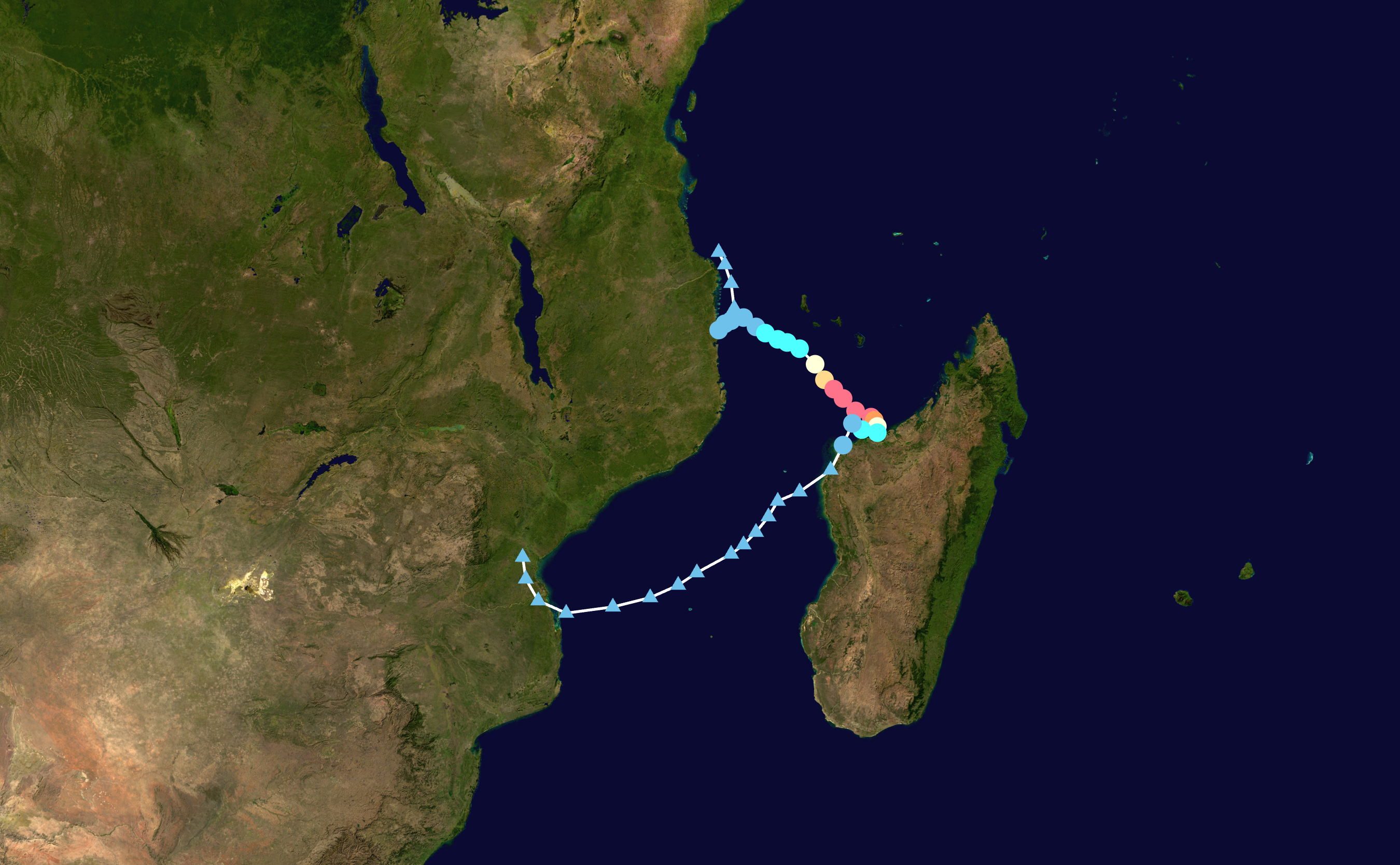
- Duration: March 27 – April 2
- Peak intensity: 230 km/h (145 mph) (10-min); 915 hPa (mbar)

One month after Subtropical Depression 13 had formed, a zone of disturbed weather rapidly intensified into Tropical Disturbance 14, late on March 27. Due to favorable conditions and entering warm waters, it rapidly became Severe Tropical Storm Hellen early on March 30. Explosive intensification occurred, making Hellen an intense tropical cyclone the same day. As Hellen reached its peak intensity, it then rapidly weakened to a tropical disturbance due to land interaction with Madagascar. During the next several days, Hellen's remnants moved southwestward, while continuing to weaken. On April 5, Hellen's remnants made landfall on Mozambique and dissipated shortly afterwards.

=== Moderate Tropical Storm Ivanoe ===
- Moderate tropical storm (MFR)
- Tropical storm (SSHWS)
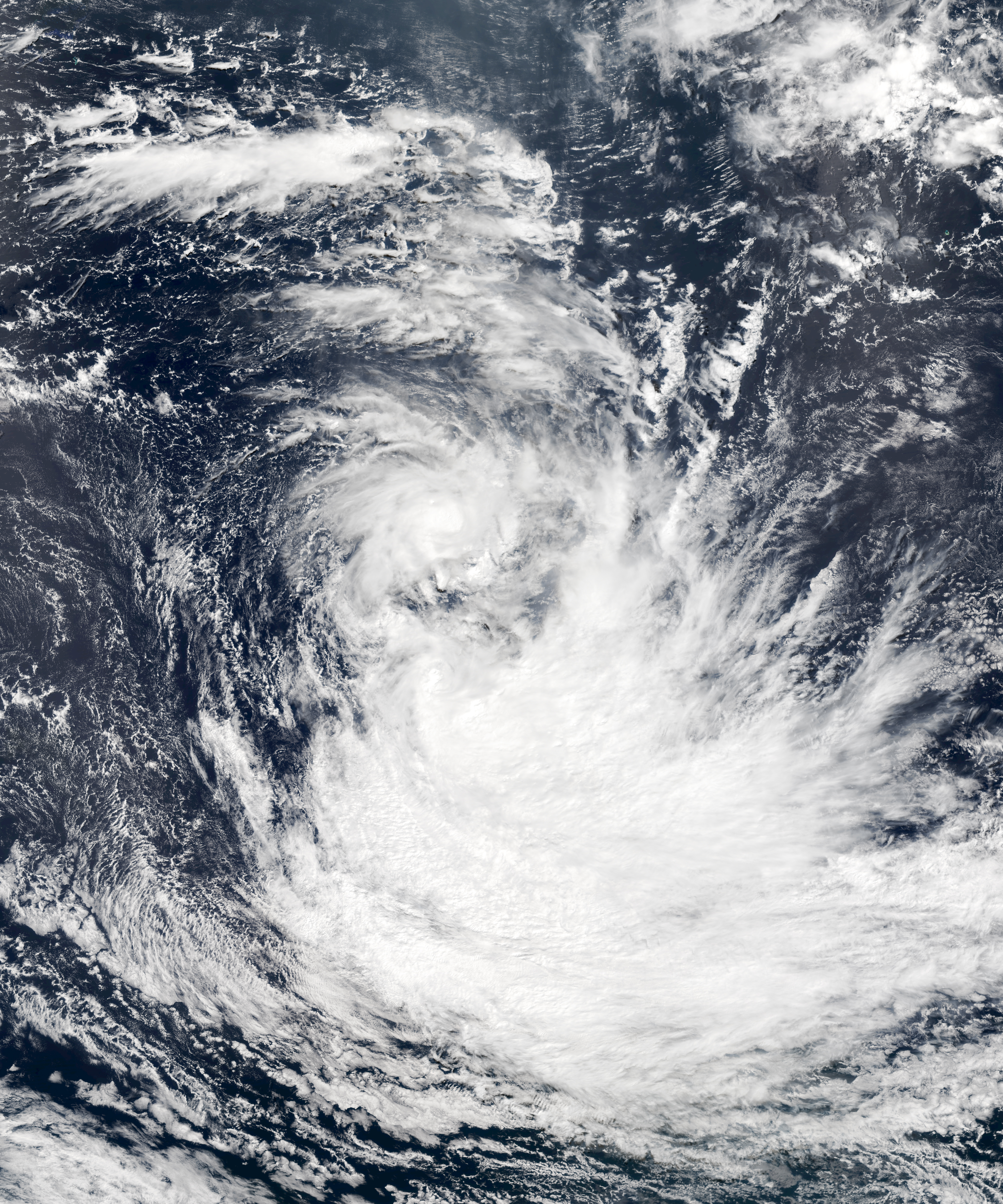
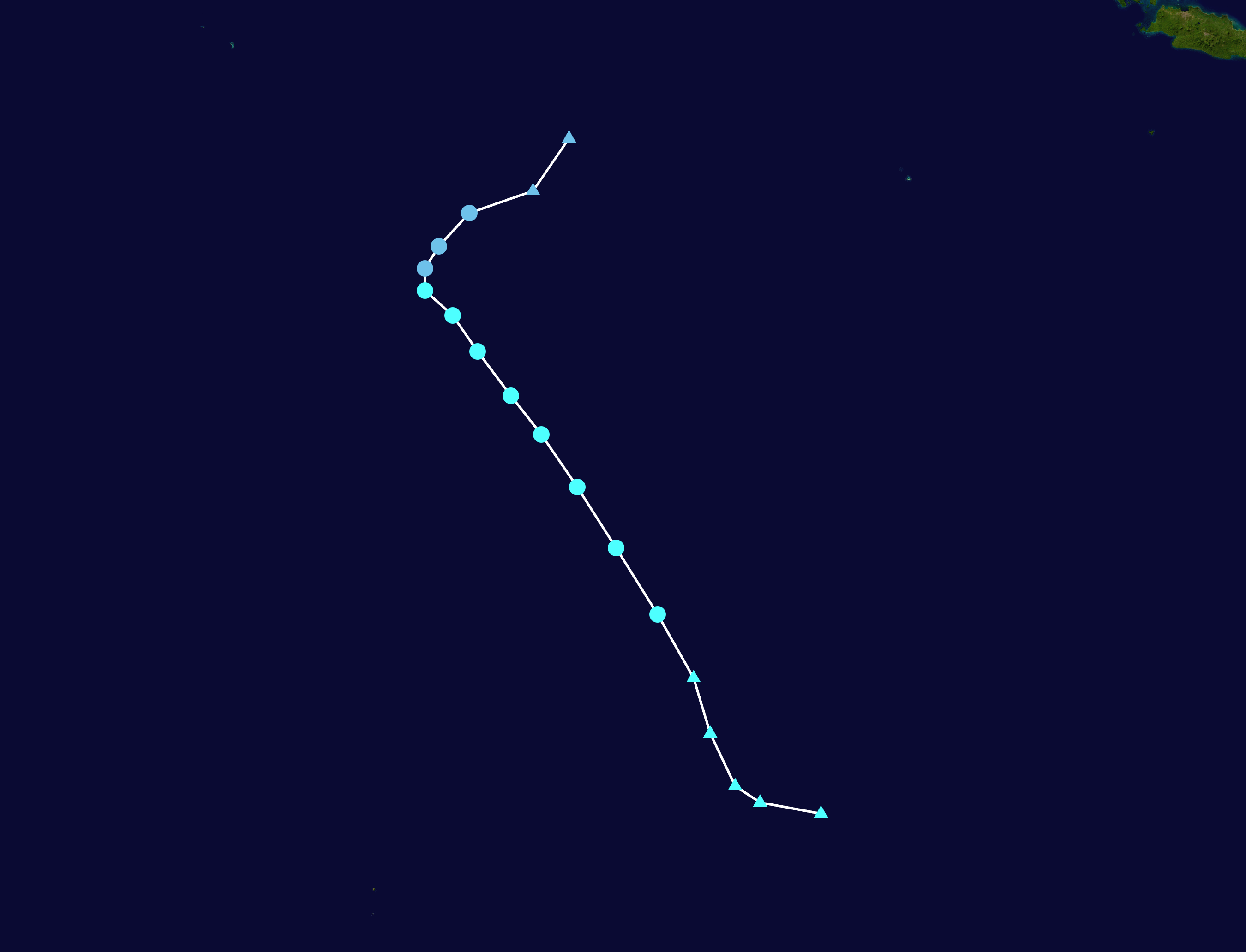
- Duration: April 3 – April 6
- Peak intensity: 85 km/h (50 mph) (10-min); 987 hPa (mbar)

Tropical Disturbance 15 formed on April 4, about 1,155 km (718 mi) south-east of Diego Garcia. On April 5, the system intensified into Moderate Tropical Storm Ivanoe. During the same day, Ivanoe strengthened to a Severe Tropical Storm and weakened back to a Moderate Tropical Storm. Moderate Tropical Storm Ivanoe weakened further as it entered cool waters. On April 6, the MFR made its final advisories on Ivanoe as the system transitioned into an extratropical cyclone.

Ivanoe's extratropical remnants continued to move in a southeastward direction as it affected the eastern part of Australia. During the morning of April 9, the remnants of Ivanoe fully dissipated.

== Storm names ==
Within the South-west Indian Ocean Tropical Depressions and Subtropical Depressions that are judged to have 10-minute sustained windspeeds of 65 km/h, (40 mph) by the Regional Specialized Meteorological Center on La Réunion Island, France (RSMC La Réunion) are usually assigned a name. However, it is the Sub-Regional Tropical Cyclone Advisory Centers in Mauritius and Madagascar who name the systems. The Sub-Regional Tropical Cyclone Advisory Center in Mauritius names the storm should it intensify into a moderate tropical storm between 55°E and 90°E, if the storm should intensify into a moderate tropical storm between 30°E and 55°E then the Sub-Regional Tropical Cyclone Advisory Center in Madagascar assigns the appropriate name to the storm. Tropical cyclones that move into this region from the Australian Region will not receive a new name. New name lists are used every year, whilst a name is normally only used once so thus no names are retired.

- Amara
- Bejisa
- Colin
- Deliwe
- Edilson
- Fobane
- Guito
- Hellen
- Ivanoe
- Jirani (unused)
- Katundu (unused)
- Letso (unused)
- Mirana (unused)
- Naserian (unused)
- Opang (unused)
- Paya (unused)
- Querida (unused)
- Romane (unused)
- Singano (unused)
- Tarus (unused)
- Unami (unused)
- Vuma (unused)
- Wamil (unused)
- Xolile (unused)
- Yasmine (unused)
- Zamile (unused)

During December, Severe Tropical Cyclone Bruce entered the Southwestern Indian Ocean basin from the Australian area of responsibility.

== Seasonal effects ==
This table lists all of the tropical cyclones and subtropical cyclones that were monitored during the 2013–2014 South-West Indian Ocean cyclone season. Information on their intensity, duration, name, areas affected, primarily comes from RSMC La Réunion. Death and damage reports come from either press reports or the relevant national disaster management agency while the damage totals are given in 2013 USD.

Name	Dates	Peak intensity			Areas affected	Damage (USD)	Deaths	Ref(s).
Name	Dates	Category	Wind speed	Pressure	Areas affected	Damage (USD)	Deaths	Ref(s).
01	October 23–27	Moderate Tropical Storm	65 km/h (40 mph)	997 hPa (29.44 inHg)	Chagos Archipelago	None	None	
Amara	December 14–27	Intense Tropical Cyclone	205 km/h (125 mph)	935 hPa (27.61 inHg)	Rodrigues	None	None	
Bruce	December 20–23 (Note: Bruce formed in the Australian cyclone region on December 16, but entered the South-West Indian Ocean on December 19. It re-entered the Australian region on December 25, as a post-tropical low.)	Very Intense Tropical Cyclone	225 km/h (140 mph)	920 hPa (27.17 inHg)	None	None	None	
Bejisa	December 27 – January 4	Intense Tropical Cyclone	175 km/h (110 mph)	950 hPa (28.05 inHg)	Seychelles, Réunion, Mauritius	>$89.2 million	1	
05	January 7–10	Tropical Depression	55 km/h (35 mph)	997 hPa (29.44 inHg)	Mozambique, Madagascar	None	None	
Colin	January 9–14	Intense Tropical Cyclone	205 km/h (125 mph)	915 hPa (27.02 inHg)	None	None	None	
Deliwe	January 14–22	Moderate Tropical Storm	85 km/h (55 mph)	990 hPa (29.23 inHg)	Madagascar, Mozambique	Unknown	2	
08	January 16–20	Zone of Disturbed Weather	35 km/h (20 mph)	1,004 hPa (29.65 inHg)	Madagascar	None	None	
09	January 24–31	Tropical Disturbance	45 km/h (30 mph)	1,002 hPa (29.59 inHg)	Mozambique	None	None	
Edilson	February 3–7	Severe Tropical Storm	105 km/h (65 mph)	978 hPa (28.88 inHg)	Mauritius, Réunion	$32.5 million	None	
Fobane	February 5–16	Severe Tropical Storm	110 km/h (70 mph)	975 hPa (28.79 inHg)	None	None	None	
Guito	February 17–21	Severe Tropical Storm	110 km/h (70 mph)	980 hPa (28.94 inHg)	Mozambique, Madagascar	None	None	
13	February 25 – March 1	Subtropical Depression	80 km/h (50 mph)	993 hPa (29.32 inHg)	None	None	None	
Hellen	March 26 – April 5	Very Intense Tropical Cyclone	230 km/h (145 mph)	915 hPa (27.02 inHg)	Mozambique, Comoro Islands, Madagascar	Unknown	8	
Ivanoe	April 3–6	Moderate Tropical Storm	85 km/h (55 mph)	987 hPa (29.15 inHg)	None	None	None	
Season aggregates
15 systems	October 21 – April 6		230 km/h (145 mph)	915 hPa (27.02 inHg)		>$122 million	11	

== See also ==
- Tropical cyclones in 2013 and 2014
- South-West Indian Ocean tropical cyclone
- List of Southern Hemisphere tropical cyclone seasons
- Atlantic hurricane seasons: 2013, 2014
- Pacific hurricane seasons: 2013, 2014
- Pacific typhoon seasons: 2013, 2014
- North Indian Ocean cyclone seasons: 2013, 2014
- 2013–14 Australian region cyclone season
- 2013–14 South Pacific cyclone season
