= Soalala Airport =

Airport in Madagascar

- IATA: DWB; ICAO: FMNO

Summary
- Airport type: Public
- Operator: ADEMA (Aéroports de Madagascar)
- Serves: Soalala
- Location: Boeny, Madagascar
- Elevation AMSL: 141 ft (43 m)
- Coordinates: 16°06′06″S 45°21′31″E

Map
- Location within Madagascar

Runways
Direction	Length		Surface
Direction	ft	m	Surface
(11/29)	(2,820)	(860)	(Concrete)

Soalala Airport is an airport in Soalala, Boeny Region, Madagascar (IATA: DWB, ICAO: FMNO).
