= Soalala mine =

Iron ore mine in Soalala, Boeny, Madagascar

Coordinates: 16°06′S 45°19′E

- Interactive map of Soalala mine
- Location: Soalala, Boeny, Madagascar
- Products: Iron ore
- Company: Wuhan Iron and Steel Corporation
- Acquired: 2010

The Soalala mine is a large iron mine located in northern Madagascar in Boeny in Soalala. It represents one of the largest iron ore reserves in Madagascar having estimated reserves of 360 million tonnes of ore grading 35% iron metal.

== See also ==
- Mining industry of Madagascar
