= Soalala =

- Location in Madagascar
- Coordinates: 16°6′S 45°19′E
- Country: Madagascar
- Region: Boeny
- District: Soalala
- Elevation: 9 m (30 ft)

Population (2001)
  - Total: 15,000
- Time zone: UTC3 (EAT)
- Postal code: 420

Soalala is a rural municipality in western Madagascar. It belongs to the district of Soalala, which is a part of Boeny Region. The population of the commune was estimated to be approximately 14,328 in 2022 commune census.

Soalala is served by a local airport and maritime harbour. It also has riverine harbour. Primary and junior level secondary education are available in town. The majority 78% of the population of the commune are farmers. The most important crop is rice, while other important products are bananas and cassava. Industry and services provide employment for 5% and 1% of the population, respectively. Additionally fishing employs 16% of the population.

Soalala was severely damaged and lost several residents when it became the landfall area for Cyclone Belna in 2019 and Cyclone Fytia in 2026.

== Economy ==
- Soalala mine - iron ore
- Marine shrimp farming
- Baie de Baly National Park
- Tsingy de Namoroka Strict Nature Reserve

== Infrastructures ==
- Soalala Airport
- Thermal power station of 60 kw.

Two additional hydraulic power stations are planned to take up operations in 2021.
