= List of longest caves by country =

This list of longest caves by country includes the longest-known natural cave per country. To be listed, the caves must have been surveyed to cave surveying standards, and the results published in reliable sources.

== List ==
Continent	Country	System	Length	coordinates	Discovery	Associated parks, protected areas
Africa	Algeria	Ghar Boumâaza (Tafna river) (غار بومعزة)	18.400 km (11.4 mi)	34°42′00″N 1°18′41″W	–	Parc National de Tlemcen
Africa	Angola	Gruta do Tchivinguiro	1.230 km (0.8 mi)	15°09′50″S 13°17′50″E	–	none
Africa	Burundi	Grotte de Mugobo	0.090 km (0.1 mi)	03°26′15″S 30°36′15″E	–	none
Africa	Cameroon	Gaskin Cave	0.450 km (0.3 mi)	4.1958°N 9.1992°E	–	Mt Cameroon National Park
Africa	Chad	Bourdout Oumou	0.115 km (0.1 mi)	17°11′N 21°35′E	–	-
Africa	Comoros	Panga Nyamaoui	0.810 km (0.5 mi)	11°24′33.06″S 43°17′04.51″E {approx.}	–	none
Africa	Congo	N'kila N'tari	1.5 km (0.9 mi)	4.120278°S 13.852778°E	–	-
Africa	Democratic Republic of the Congo	Ngovo Cave	9.522 km (5.9 mi)	5.3019°S 14.9373°E	–	none
Africa	Eswatini (former Swaziland)	Gobholo Cave	1.099 km (0.7 mi)	26.35721°S 31.16932°E	2012	none
Africa	Egypt	Sannur Cave	0.275 km (0.2 mi)	28°37′23″N 31°17′11″E	–	none
Africa	Equatorial Guinea	Cueva Caracas	0.036 km (0.0 mi)	02°09′00″N 11°19′00″E	1967	none
Africa	Ethiopia	Sof Omar Cave (ሶፍ-ዑመር)	15.1 km (9.4 mi)	6°54′22.7″N 40°50′41.6″E	1972	none
Africa	Gabon	Mbenaltembe Cave	2.4 km (1.5 mi)	2°20′32″S 11°35′20″E	2008	none
Africa	Kenya	Leviathan Cave	9.152 km (5.7 mi)	02°40′48.89″S 37°52′48.86″E	1975	Chyulu Hills
Africa	Libya	Umm al Masabih(أم المصابيح)	3.593 km (2.2 mi)	32°04′06″N 12°41′40″E	–	none
Africa	Madagascar	Marosakabe cave system	124.255 km (77.2 mi)	16.45189°S 45.33543°E	2006	Tsingy de Namoroka Nature Reserve
Africa	Morocco	Win Timdouine	19.128 km (11.9 mi)	30°40′49″N 9°20′41″W	–	none
Africa	Mozambique	Khodzu (Codzo) Cave	0.942 km (0.6 mi)	18.56472°S 34.86666°E	–	none
Africa	Namibia	Arnhem Cave	4.5 km (2.8 mi)	22.70138°S 18.09638°E	–	none
Africa	Nigeria	Ogbunike Cave	0.350 km (0.2 mi)	06°11′11″N 06°54′21″E	-	none
Africa	Rwanda	Ubuvumo Bwibihonga	4.530 km (2.8 mi)	01°38′53.2″S 29°22′42.5″E	-	none
Africa	South Africa	Apocalypse Pothole	12.302 km (7.6 mi)	26°16′11.04″S 27°17′37.38″E(approx.)	–	none
Africa	Tanzania	Nan'goma Cave	7.510 km (4.7 mi)	8°30′41.2″S 38°53′0.7″E	–	none
Africa	Tunisia	Cave Mine	4.100 km (2.5 mi)	35°56′48.21″N 09°34′45.02″E	–	none
Africa	Uganda	Garama Cave	0.342 km (0.2 mi)	1.35670°S 29.63112°E	–	Mgahinga National Park
Africa	Zimbabwe	Batze Cave	1.037 km (0.6 mi)	17.1672°S 29.1836°E	–	none
Asia	Afghanistan	Ab Bar Amada Cave	1.220 km (0.8 mi)	35.245800°N 69.180000°E		none
Asia	Armenia	Arjeri qarandzav (Bears cave)	3.500 km (2.2 mi)	39.7099028°N 45.243970°E	-	none
Asia	Cambodia	Roung Dei Ho–Thom Ken	2.036 km (1.3 mi)	10.61684°N 104.2429°E	–	none
Asia	China	Shuanghedong Cave Network (双河洞)	437.434 km (271.8 mi)	28.24199°N 107.27608°E	1988	Suiyang Shuanghedong National Geopark
Asia	India	Krem Liat Prah	31.070 km (19.3 mi)	25.37404°N 92.53816°E		none
Asia	Indonesia	Luweng Jaran system	18.200 km (11.3 mi)	8.21758°S 111.00625°E		none
Asia	Irak	Kuna Kamtiar	5.060 km (3.1 mi)	35°21′30.5″N 45°01′26.7″E		none
Asia	Iran	Katale Khor	12.860 km (8.0 mi)	35°50′08″N 48°09′42″E		none
Asia	Israel	Malcham Cave	10 km (6.2 mi)	31°07′19″N 35°23′00″E		none
Asia	Japan	Akkadō (安家洞)	23.7 km (14.7 mi)	39°59′1.1″N 141°44′10.05″E		none
Asia	Jordan	Al-Fahda Cave	0.924 km (0.6 mi)	18.426°N 7.622°E		none
Asia	Kazakhstan	Uluchar Cave	1.500 km (0.9 mi)	42°03′15.69″N 70°05′49.01″E(approx.)		none
Asia	Laos	Nam Dôn cave system	42.0 km (26.1 mi)	17°33′45.30″N 104°52′47.36″E		none
Asia	Lebanon	Jeita Grotto	10.050 km (6.2 mi)	33.9439055°N 35.6441077°E		none
Asia	Malaysia	Clearwater Cave System (malay:Gua Air Jernih)	255.9 km (159.0 mi)	4.06529°N 114.83176°E	1978	Gunung Mulu National Park
Asia	Mongolia	Taliin Cave	0.240 km (0.1 mi)	45°35′25.00″N 114°30′02.06″E		none
Asia	Myanmar	Som Hein Cave	11.000 km (6.8 mi)	21°01′41.73″N 100°07′10.59″E	–	none
Asia	Nepal	Gupteshwor Mahadev Cave (Patale Chango) (गुप्तेश्वर महादेव गुफा)	2.057 km (1.3 mi)	28.189552°N 83.957847°E		none
Asia	Oman	Al Hoota Cave	4.5 km (2.8 mi)	23.081944°N 57.354722°E		none
Asia	Pakistan	Pir Ghaib Gharr Gharra	1.275 km (0.8 mi)	29°45′36.0″N 67°17′24.0″E (approx.)		none
Asia	Philippines	St.Pauls Underground River Cave	24.0 km (14.9 mi)	10°11′57.45″N 118°55′34.46″E		Puerto Princesa Subterranean River National Park
Asia	Saudi Arabia	Cave of Maker al-Shiahi	2.775 km (1.7 mi)	25°28′20.29″N 39°47′32.78″E	2025	-
Asia	South Korea	Billemotdonggul	11.749 km (7.3 mi)	33.3874°N 126.4092°E		none
Asia	Tajikistan	Rangkulskaya Cave	2.050 km (1.3 mi)	38.433930°N 74.306490°E		none
Asia	Thailand	Tham Phra Wang Daeng	13.7 km (8.5 mi)	16.6785254°N 100.687444°E		none
Asia	Turkey	Pınargözü Cave	16 km (9.9 mi) or 10.5 km (6.5 mi)	37°41′48″N 31°18′27″E		none
Asia	Turkmenistan	Kap-Kutan (Кап-Кутан)	57 km (35.4 mi)	37°44′00″N 66°26′00″E		none
Asia	Uzbekistan	Dark Star (cave)	17.400 km (10.8 mi)	38.396389°N 67.286944°E		1984
Asia	Vietnam	Hang Khe Ry cave system	18.900 km (11.7 mi)	17.5812°N 106.2830°E		none
Asia	Yemen (Socotra)	Giniba Cave	13.526 km (8.4 mi)	12°26′06.5″N 53°56′21.40″E		none
Caribbean	Bahamas	Lucayan Caverns (Ben's Cave)	10.363 km (6.4 mi)	26.60544°N 78.40183°W		Lucayan National Park
Caribbean	Belize	Chiquibul Cave System	15 km (9.3 mi) (Note: Several lengths of the network, between 40,50 or 65km are reported by different secondary sources. However, the reference cited there clearly states that the network is split between at least 4 unconnected caves, and the total length of the network cannot be the addition of 4 individual caves.) (approx.)	16.6645860°N 89.0895238°W		Chiquibul National Park
Caribbean	Cuba	Gran Caverna de Palmarito	54 km (33.6 mi)	22.6434673°N 83.7335970°W		none
Caribbean	Haiti	Marie-Jeanne cave	5.3 km (3.3 mi)	18.254543°N 74.094270°W		none
Caribbean	Jamaica	Gourie Cave	3.505 km (2.2 mi)	18°11′40.2″N 77°30′38.4″W		none
Caribbean	Puerto-Rico	Sistema del Rio Encantado	21.770 km (13.5 mi)	18°20′37″N 66°31′46″W		none
Caribbean	Dominican Republic	Boca del Infierno (cueva Fun-Fun)	9.3 km (5.8 mi)	18.788807°N 69.4195916°W		none
Europe	Albania	Lengarices system	12.9 km (8.0 mi)	40.24431°N 20.43213°E (approx)	2023	none
Europe	Austria	Schönberg-Höhlensystem	156.942 km (97.5 mi)	47.701528°N 13.772333°E	1976	none
Europe	Belgium	Caves of Han-sur-Lesse	10.693 km (6.6 mi)	50.1206388°N 5.1921683°E	-	none
Europe	Bosnia and Herzegovina	Govještica	9.870 km (6.1 mi)	43°46′30.83″N 18°53′23.44″E	-	none
Europe	Bulgaria	Duhlata (Духлата)	18.200 km (11.3 mi)	42.4966087°N 23.1961941°E	–	none
Europe	Croatia	Jamski sustav Kita Gaćešina-Draženova puhaljka	63.746 km (39.6 mi)	44°15′N 15°51′E	-	none
Europe	Czech Republic	Amatérská Cave	39.146 km (24.3 mi)	49.3785997°N 16.7284358°E	-	none
Europe	Denmark (Greenland)	Cove Cave	0.103 km (0.1 mi)	80°14′48.24″N 21°57′22.23″W	-	none
Europe	Finland	Lohikäärmeen Luola Caves	0.300 km (0.2 mi)	60.16202°N 24.16202°E	-	none
Europe	France	Réseau Félix Trombe	117.2 km (72.8 mi)	42.97250°N 0.86639°E	1908	none
Europe	Georgia	Tovliani Upskruli (თოვლიანი უფსკრული)	24,080 km (14,962.6 mi)	43°15′53″N 40°43′06″E	-	none
Europe	Germany	Riesending Cave	23.8 km (14.8 mi)	47°41′49″N 12°59′5″E	-	none
Europe	Greece	Diros cave	15.400 km (9.6 mi)	36.63836°N 22.38066°E	-	none
Europe	Hungary	Pálvölgyi-Mátyáshegyi System	31.0 km (19.3 mi)	47.5329°N 19.015°E	-	none
Europe	Iceland	Laufbalavatn	5.013 km (3.1 mi)	63.91130°N 19.37835°W	-	none
Europe	Ireland	Pollnagollum	16 km (9.9 mi)	53.07716°N 9.25136°W	-	none
Europe	Italy	Complesso del Monte Canin	83.800 km (52.1 mi)	46.37739°N 13.42947°E	-	none
Europe	Kosovo	The Cave of the Great Gorge	08.036 km (5.0 mi)	42°39′54.03″N 20°13′51.67″E(approx)	–	none
Europe	Latvia	Riežupe sand caves	0.351 km (0.2 mi)	57°00′24.93″N 21°59′13.53″E	-	none
Europe	Lithuania	Cows Ola Cave	0.046 km (0.0 mi)	56.206742°N 24.694461°E	-	none
Europe	North Macedonia	Slatinski Izvor cave (Слатински Извор)	3.932 km (2.4 mi)	41°34′47.86″N 21°12′47.67″E	–	none
Europe	Moldova	Emil Racoviță Cave	92.080 km (57.2 mi)	48.2801152°N 26.6335117°E	–	none
Europe	Montenegro	Pećina nad vražjim firovima(Ђаловића пећина)	17.500 km (10.9 mi)	43.0726346°N 19.9205968°E	-	none
Europe	Norway	Tjoarvekrajgge	25.167 km (15.6 mi)	67°36′35″N 15°41′31″E	–	none
Europe	Poland	Jaskinia Wielka Śnieżna	23.723 km (14.7 mi)	49°14′24″N 19°55′23″E	–	none
Europe	Portugal	Gruta do Almonda	14 km (8.7 mi)	39°30′17″N 8°36′58″W	–	none
Europe	Romania	Peștera Vântului	47 km (29.2 mi)	46.9392°N 22.5436°E	-	none
Europe	Russia	Botovskaya (Ботовская пещера)	70.414 km (43.8 mi)	55.3086°N 105.3434°E	-	none
Europe	Serbia	Lazareva Pećina	9.818 km (6.1 mi)	44.0293°N 21.9627°E	–	none
Europe	Slovakia	Demanovsky jaskynny system	49.536 km (30.8 mi)	49°0′18″N 19°35′13″E	–	none
Europe	Slovenia	Migovec System	43.009 km (26.7 mi)	46°15′07″N 13°45′50″E	–	Triglav National Park
Europe	Spain	Sistema del Alto Tejuelo	208.984 km (129.9 mi)	43.25306°N 3.68079°W	1965	none
Europe	Sweden	Coral Cave	5.0 km (3.1 mi)	64.888684°N 14.110749°E		none
Europe	Switzerland	Hölloch	211.229 km (131.3 mi)	46.976670°N 8.788330°E	1875	none
Europe	Ukraine	Optymistychna (Оптимістична)	264.576 km (164.4 mi)	48.73494°N 25.97379°E	-	none
Europe	United Kingdom	Three Counties System	86.619 km (53.8 mi)	54.20699°N 2.506452°W	1966	none
North America	Canada	Castleguard Cave	21.311 km (13.2 mi)	52.07718°N 117.21322°W	–	none
North America	Costa Rica	Sistema kárstico del Cerro Corredor	3.872 km (2.4 mi)	8.66°N 82.91°W	–	none
North America	Honduras	Cueva de la Quebrada Susmay	6.690 km (4.2 mi)	14°58′56.24″N 86°02′55.44″W	–	none
North America	Mexico	Sistema Ox Bel Ha	496.8 km (308.7 mi)	20.16028°N 87.48750°W	1996	none
North America	Panama	Ol' Bank Underworld Cave	1.146 km (0.7 mi)	9.301034°N 82.137244°W	–	Isla Bastimentos National Marine Park
North America	United States	Mammoth Cave	685.6 km (426.0 mi)	37.18758°N 86.10357°W	1791	Mammoth Cave National Park
Oceania	Australia	Bullita Cave	123.0 km (76.4 mi)	16.06333°S 130.38333°E	1990	Gregory National Park
Oceania	New Zealand	Bulmer Caverns	74.319 km (46.2 mi)	41.5583°S 172.5188°E	1984	none
Oceania	Papua New Guinea	Mamo Kananda	54.800 km (34.1 mi)	5.6100°S 142.3314°E	–	none
Oceania	Samoa	La'auoleola	5 km (3.1 mi)	13.53652°S 172.52919°W		none
Oceania	Vanuatu	Kafae Aven	3.702 km (2.3 mi)	15°32′21.27″S 167°00′51.07″E	–	none
South America	Argentina	Caverna del Templo	3.432 km (2.1 mi)	38.611111°S 70.389167°W		none
South America	Bolivia	Caverna de Umajalanta	4.6 km (2.9 mi)	18.1145°S 65.8116°W		none
South America	Brazil	Toca da Boa Vista	114 km (70.8 mi)	10.1625251°S 40.8597012°W	1987	none
South America	Chile	Roiho system	6.350 km (3.9 mi)	27.114452°S 109.40324°W		none
South America	Colombia	Cueva del Hipocampo	2.021 km (1.3 mi)	6.059954°N 73.840134°W		none
South America	Ecuador	Systema Sylvana	4.1 km (2.5 mi)	0.623017°S 90.368254°W		Galápagos National Park
South America	Peru	Tragadero de Parjugsha Grande	4.070 km (2.5 mi)	6.30143°S 77.73762°W		none
South America	Uruguay	Grutas of Salamanque	0.300 km (0.2 mi)	34°04′42.03″S 54°36′26.42″W		none
South America	Venezuela	Cueva del Saman	18.148 km (11.3 mi)	10.798°N 72.431°W	–	none

== See also ==
- List of caves
- List of longest caves
- Speleology
