= Achille Urbain =

French biologist (1884–1957)

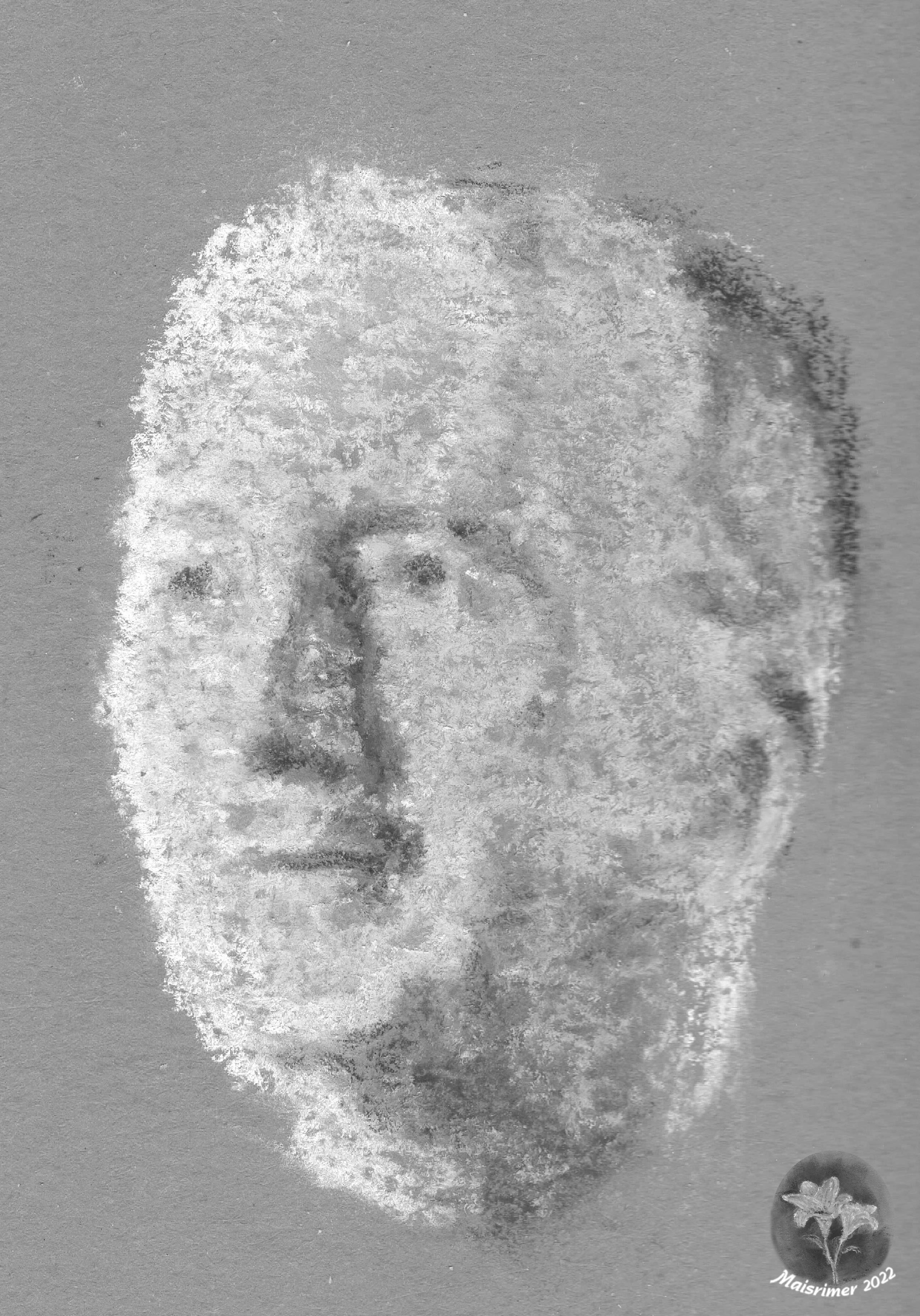

Personal life
- Born: May 9, 1884 Le Havre, France
- Died: October 24, 1957 (aged 73) Paris, France

Achille Joseph Urbain (9 May 1884 – 5 December 1957) was a French biologist born in Le Havre.

== Biography ==
In 1906 he obtained his degree from the national veterinary school at Lyon, afterwards attaining a bachelor's degree in natural sciences (1912) and a doctorate of sciences with a thesis involving plant physiology (1920) During his career, he worked in a military veterinary research laboratory, and in the meantime, conducted studies as a microbiologist and immunologist at the Pasteur Institute.

In 1931 he resigned from military service, and in 1934 was appointed director of the Vincennes Zoo in Paris. From 1942 to 1949, he was director of the Muséum National d'Histoire Naturelle.

In 1937 he scientifically described the kouprey, based on a young male individual captured in Preah Vihear Province, Cambodia.

== Selected publications ==
- Achille Urbain: "Le parc zoologique du bois de Vincennes", La Revue de Paris, August 15, 1934.
- Achille Urbain: "Guide officiel avec plan du parc zoologique du bois de Vincennes", 1935.
- Achille Urbain: "Le kou-prey ou bœuf gris cambodgien", Bulletin de la Société Zoologique de France 62(5), 1937, pp. 305–307.
- Achille Urbain: "Le Kou Prey ou bœuf sauvage cambodgien", Mammalia, vol. 1, 1937, pp. 257–258.
- Achille Urbain: "La réaction de fixation dans les tuberculoses humaines et animales", 1938.
- Achille Urbain, Paul Rode, and M. A. Pasquier: "La collection des bovinés asiatiques du Parc zoologique du Bois de Vincennes", Mammalia, vol. 3, 1939, pp. 122–125.
- Achille Urbain: "Une nouvelle espèce de bovidé asiatique", Comptes Rendus de l'Académie des Sciences, vol. 209, 1939, pp. 1006–1007.
- Achille Urbain: Psychologie des animaux sauvages : instinct, intelligence, Flammarion, Paris, 1940.
- Achille Urbain, Paul Rode: Les singes anthropoïdes, Collection Que sais-je?, N°202, Presses universitaires de France, Paris, 1946.
