= Von der Decken's sifaka =

Conservation status
- Critically Endangered (IUCN 3.1)
- CITES Appendix I

Scientific classification
- Kingdom: Animalia
- Phylum: Chordata
- Class: Mammalia
- Order: Primates
- Suborder: Strepsirrhini
- Family: Indriidae
- Genus: Propithecus
- Species: P. deckenii

Binomial name
- Propithecus deckenii W. Peters, 1870
- Distribution of P. deckenii

Species of lemur

Von der Decken's sifaka (Propithecus deckenii), or Decken's sifaka, is a lemur that is endemic to the arid, deciduous and spiny succulent forests of western Madagascar. As one of the smaller sifakas, it has full body length of 90 to 110 centimeters (35 to 43 in), of which 50 to 60 centimeters (20 to 24 in) are its tail. Body weights vary between 3.0 and 4.5 kilograms (6.6 and 9.9 lb). Its pelage is usually creamy white, with tinges of yellow-gold, silver-gray or pale brown on the neck, shoulders, back, and limbs. The face is black with a patch of white fur on the bulbous bridge of the nose. Melanistic forms are found in some areas, which have complicated the taxonomic history of the species, especially regarding its relationship with the crowned sifaka (Propithecus coronatus).

Von der Decken's sifaka is an arboreal, diurnal, folivorous primate. Arboreal locomotion is facilitated by vertical clinging and leaping, while a bipedal "dance" is used to travel across the ground. P. deckenii maintains its folivorous diet using its robust cecum and two large intestines. It lives in small groups that typically consist of three to six individuals that usually contain a single reproductive female. Conflicting reports of population densities provide a wide range of distribution patterns for the species, with a maximum reported density of 309 lemurs/km^{2}. The species is remarkably adaptable to habitat change, and is sometimes found in urban areas.

The IUCN considers von der Decken's sifaka to be a critically endangered species, and it is listed in CITES Appendix I. The species is threatened by habitat loss as a result of deforestation for the production of charcoal and for the creation of pastures for livestock. Poaching for bushmeat and live capture for the exotic pet trade are other threats to the survival of von der Decken's sifakas in the wild. The IUCN predicts a population decline of 80% between 2020 and 2050.

== Etymology ==
The term "sifaka" is dervied from a vocalization produced by von der Decken's sifaka during threat displays, which is uttered while jerking its head backwards multiple times in succession. This vocalization is also produced by other members of the P. verreauxi species group within Propithecus. It is also known as the tsibahaka in Malagasy.

The species' English and binomial names honor German explorer Karl Klaus von der Decken.

== Taxonomy ==
Von der decken's sifaka belongs to the western P. verreauxi species complex of smaller sifakas, rather than the larger eastern sifakas, or simponas, of the P. diadema group. It was at initially classified as a subspecies of Verreaux's sifaka (P. verreauxi), but was elevated to specific status by Urs Thalmann and Nasolo Rakotoarison in 1994. The somatic number is 2n = 48.

Reports of melanistic variants of von der Decken's sifaka that closely resembled the pelage patterns of the crowned sifaka prompted some authors, such as Ian Tattersall, to consider the two taxa to be synonymous. In addition to individuals that resembled P. coronatus appearing within the typically allotted range of P. deckenii, individuals that resembled von der Decken's sifaka were found in the crowned sifaka's range, and wholly melanistic individuals that resembled neither species, as well as other individuals that resembled both species, occurred in the south of von der Decken's sifaka's range. The confusion surrounding the distribution of various pelage phenotypes was worsened by a lack of photographic evidence in older sources. The taxonomic status of the two species remains unresolved, and further research may be necessary to arrive at a consensus.

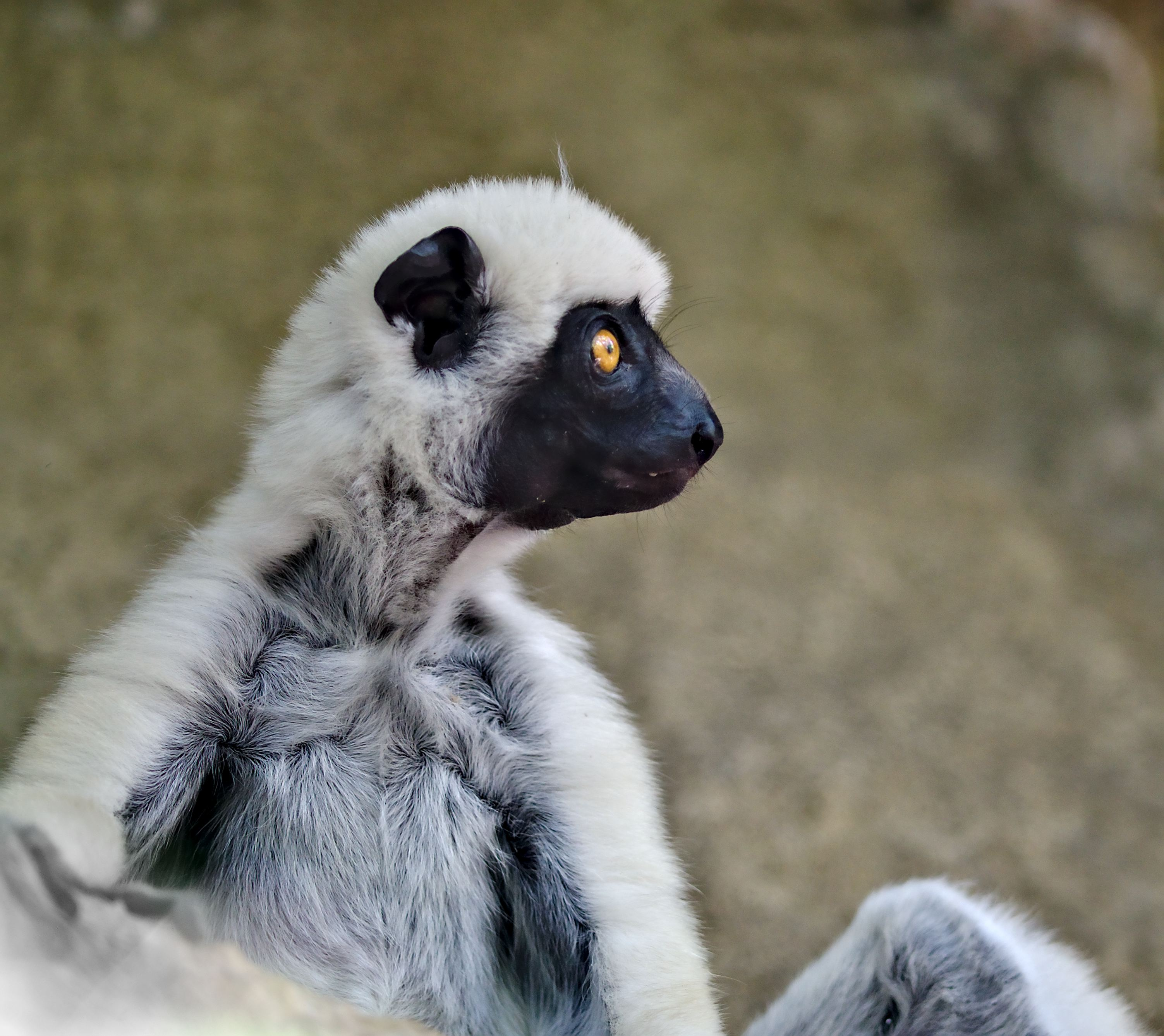
Von der Decken's sifaka and the crowned sifaka were considered by some authors to be synonymous due to pelage variations that resembled each other.

== Anatomy and physiology ==
Von der Decken's sifaka is one of the smallest sifakas, with a head-body length of 40–48 centimeters (16–19 in) and a tail length of 50–60 cm (20–24 in), totaling into a whole-body length of 90–110 cm (35–43 in). Body weights range between 3.0 and 4.5 kilograms (6.6 and 9.9 lb). The skull is short and conical, and is articulated at a right angle atop the spinal column, giving von der Decken's sifaka an upright posture. Unlike most lemurs, the facial skeleton is positioned in front of the braincase, rather than below it. Von der Decken's sifaka possesses a prominent boss on the nasal bone, which is a trait that is shared with the crowned sifaka, and is indicative of the two species' phylogenetic closeness. This boss is, however, notably smaller when compared to the crowned sifaka's. The mandible is deep and robust, such that it appears simian-like when viewed from the side.

P. deckenii has a bulbous boss on the bridge of its nose.

The dentition follows the indrisine pattern of having two types of deciduous teeth that are not replaced in the permanent dentition. Two so-called "deciduous premolars" are present in the deciduous dentition. The deciduous dental formula is 2.1.22.1.2 × 2 = 20. Conflicting models for the permanent dentition of von der Decken's sifaka have been proposed. Unlike most other lemurs, the indrisine dentition presents a toothcomb consisting of only four, rather than six, teeth. The outer tooth in the permanent toothcomb has been described as either an incisor accompanied by a missing lower canine (C_{−}) (2.1.2.32.0.2.3 × 2 = 30), or as an incisiform canine accompanied by a missing lower incisor (I_{2}) (2.1.2.31.1.2.3 × 2 = 30). The hands are narrow, with the fingers being linked by a cutaneous webbing up to the proximal phalanges. The digital webbing is more pronounced in the feet than in the hands. The digital formula is 4>3>5>2>1.

Von der Decken's sifaka has a large, highly sacculated cecum that facilitates the breakdown of plant matter in its digestive tract. It possesses two large intestines. The first large intestine is arranged as an ovoid spriral known as a tortillon. This shape assists with preventing blockages that could result from the large volume of food that is ingested by von der Decken's sifaka. The second large intestine floats freely, and connects to the rectum without structural demarcation.

Most individuals possess wholly white pelages that are tinged with a yellowish or gray hues. The tail is tawny at the base, and the skin is black. A white tinge is present on top of the nose. Some inland individuals' pelages have a gray ring encircling the neck, while some coastal von der Decken's sifakas may have a gray spot on the dorsum. In some individuals, the coloration of the lower back and legs turn gray with age. A cutaneous fold runs along the side of the thorax, forming a membrane that connects the thorax with the forelimbs.

=== Melanism ===
Von der Decken's sifaka presents many variant color patterns, ranging from the typical coloration described above to almost entirely black melanistic forms. Hybridization with crowned sifakas has been proposed as an explanation for these melanistic variants, based on field reports from the upper Mahavavy River. Jean-Jacques Petter and André Peyriéras observed a mating event between a male exhibiting the pelage coloration of a crowned sifaka and a female von der Decken's sifaka, which produced an apparent hybrid offspring that possessed a pelage pattern akin to its father's, featuring a dark brown head and anterior aspect of the torso. However, such pelage patterns have also been observed in individuals that do not live near sites where interspecific mating could have occurred, and hybridization does not explain the occurrence of individuals with melanism that exceed the head-torso pattern exhibited by crowned sifakas. Petter and Peyriéras proposed that melanism could be an adaptation to altitudinal and climatic factors. Laingoniaina Herifito Fidèle Rakotonirina et al. posited that this could be the result of von der Decken's sifaka occasionally exhibiting a pelage pattern akin to that of the crowned sifaka, thereby calling into question whether or not they are sympatric. Alternatively, this phenomenon could have resulted from occasional gene flow with the crowned sifaka.

== Behavior ==
Female with infant

Von der Decken's sifaka is diurnal and folivorous. The average size of social groups varies between localities, with two to six being reported in the southeast of the species' range, two to five in the southwest, and mean group sizes of 4.9, 3.0, and 4.8 being reported from the northeast of the range. In general, groups of three to six are the most common social arrangement. Groups typically only have one reproductive female at a time.

The species locomotes by vertical clinging and leaping, whereby it launches from vertical substrates through a rapid extension of the legs. Terrestrial locomotion is accomplished through a "dancing" behavior, whereby a von der Decken's sifaka travels by hopping across the ground bipedally, typically while the arms are held aloft.

== Distribution ==
Von der Decken's sifaka occurs in fragmented deciduous forests and tsingy in western Madagascar, ranging from elevations of sea level along the coast to 1,250 m (4,100 ft) in the Bongolava Massif. Most recordings of the species are in agreement of its distribution west of the Mahavavy River and north of the Manambolo River. These boundaries have been complicated by reports of von der Decken's sifakas beyond these limits, such as east of the Mahavavy. Anomalous sightings have been attributed to river crossing events resulting from seasonal changes in river direction and size. Surveys have reiterated the role of the Mahavavy as a geographic barrier for von der Decken's sifaka, even at its southern headwaters. This could indicate that the anomalous sightings of von der Decken's sifakas outside of its range are the result of anthropogenic factors such as captive releases, or that they are due to river crossings that are too infrequent to be considered natural extensions of the species' range. Some von der Decken's sifakas live in urban areas such as Soalala. The total area of occupancy is estimated to be 9,356 km^{2} (3,612 sq mi). Climate change could affect this distribution area, and possibly increase the area of occupancy.

A wide variety of population densities have been reported for von der Decken's sifaka. Estimates vary between 46 lemurs/km^{2} to 309 lemurs/km^{2}. The species likely underwent a recent population decline, which is anticipated to continue without the intervention of conservation efforts.

== Conservation status ==
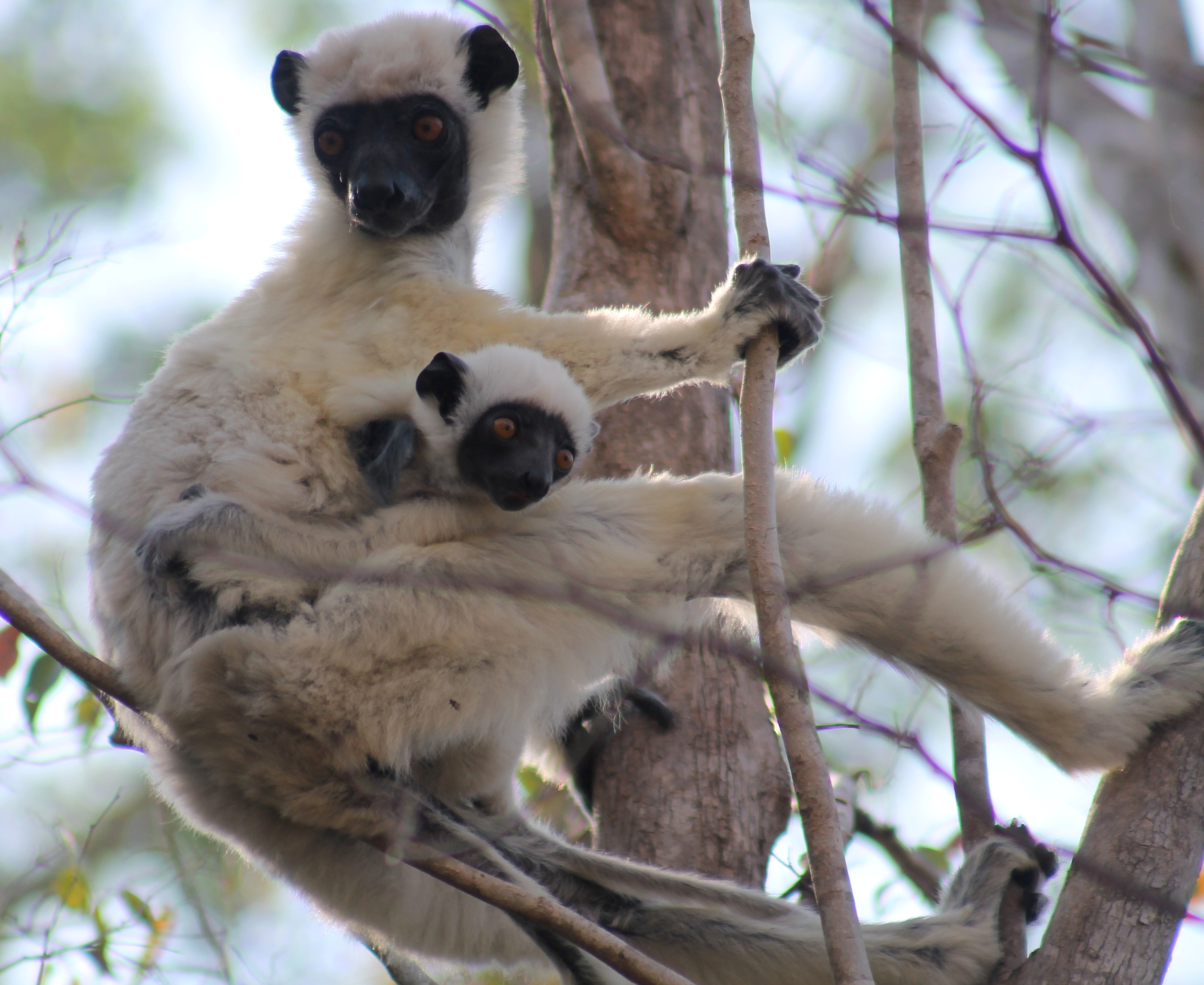
The IUCN predicts a population decline of 80% bewteen 2020 and 2050.

Von der Decken's sifaka is listed as a critically endangered species by the IUCN Red List, and is placed in Appendix I by CITES. A population decline of at least 80% is expected to occur between 2020 and 2050. The greatest threat to the species' survival is habitat loss as a result of deforestation in Madagascar for the production of charcoal, for logging, and for creating pastures for livestock. Two surveys published in 2014 reported signs of habitat destruction at all surveyed sites. Poaching for bushmeat and live capture for the exotic pet trade also contribute to the endangerment of the species. Traditional taboos known as fady prohibit the hunting or consumption of certain lemur species, and provide some protection from poaching to the von der Decken's sifaka. Such taboos are not ubiquitous across ethnic groups, and a breakdown of traditional beliefs in Malagasy society due to immigration has resulted in an increase in poaching of sifaka species that were previously protected by fady.

Von der Decken's sifaka is protected in Baie de Baly, Tsingy de Bemaraha and Namoroka National Parks, as well as in the Tsingy de Bemaraha Strict Nature Reserve, Mahavavy-Kinkony Wetland Complex, Beanka and Tsimembo Harmonious Protected Landscapes, and Ambohijanahary, Bemarivo, Kasijy, and Maningoza Special Reserves.

In 2023, there were at 10 captive von der Decken's sifakas in registered facilities within Madagascar, with more being held in illegal captivity. There are no known captive individuals outside of the country.
