= Soalala District =

- District
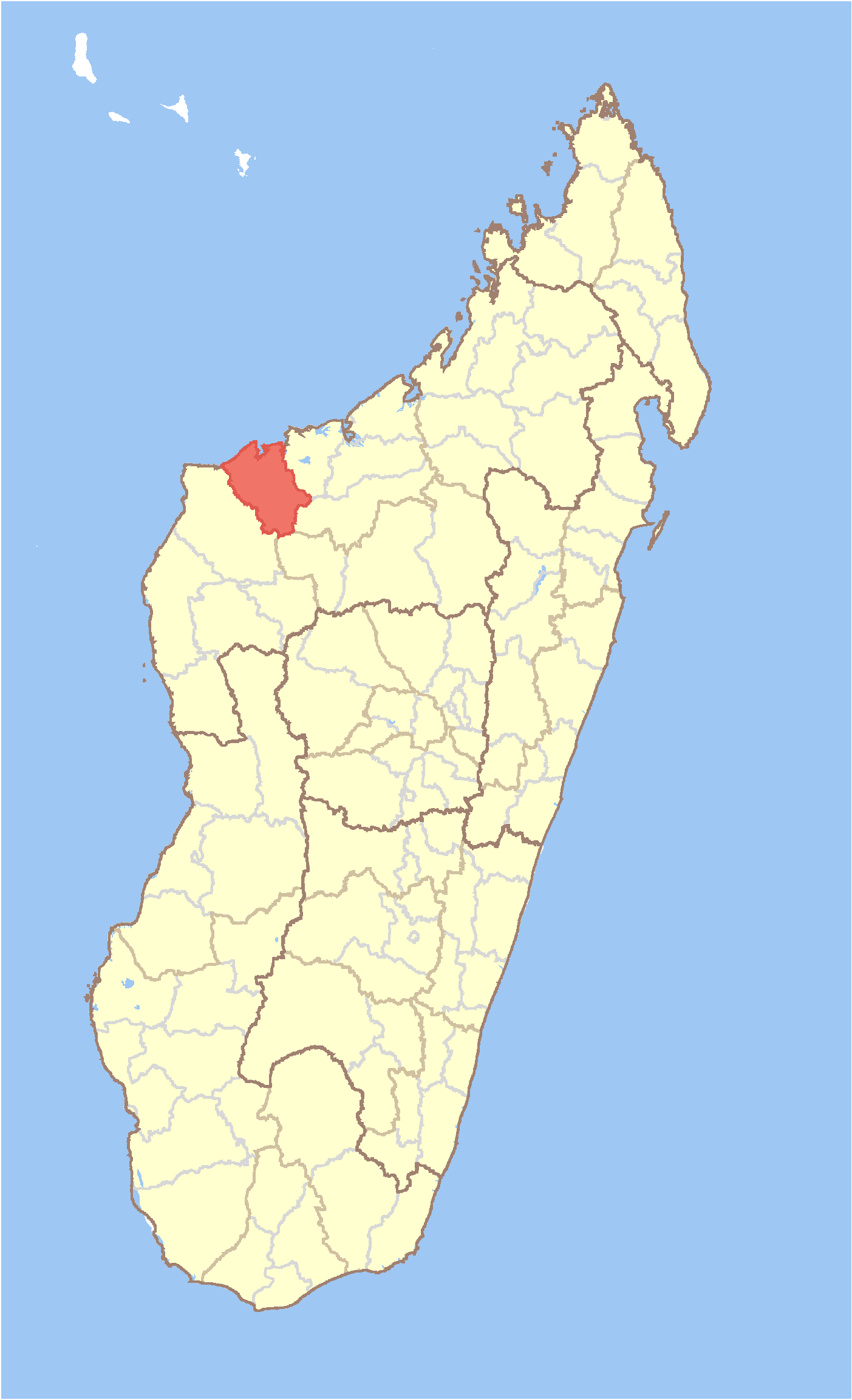
- Location in Madagascar
- Coordinates: 16°26′S 45°23′E
- Country: Madagascar
- Region: Boeny

Area
  - Total: 6,578 km^{2} (2,540 sq mi)

Population (2020)
  - Total: 43,059
  - Density: 6.546/km^{2} (16.95/sq mi)
  - Ethnicities: Sakalava
- Time zone: UTC3 (EAT)

Soalala is a district in western Madagascar. It is a part of Boeny Region and borders the districts of Mitsinjo in northeast, Ambato-Boeni in east, Kandreho in south and Besalampy in west. The area is 6,578 km^{2} (2,540 sq mi) and the population was estimated to be 43,059 in 2020.

There had been several victimes of Cyclone Belna that fell land on 9 December 2019 in Soalala.

== Communes ==
The district is further divided into three communes:

- Ambohipaky
- Andranomavo
- Soalala

== Economy ==
- Soalala mine - which contains iron ore
- Marine shrimp farming
- Baie de Baly National Park
- Namoroka National Park is situated in the Soalala District.

== Infrastructures ==
- Soalala Airport
- Thermal power station of 60 kw.
- Two additional hydraulic power stations are planned to take up operations in 2021.
