= Sof Omar Caves =

Longest cave in Ethiopia

Sof Omar Cave
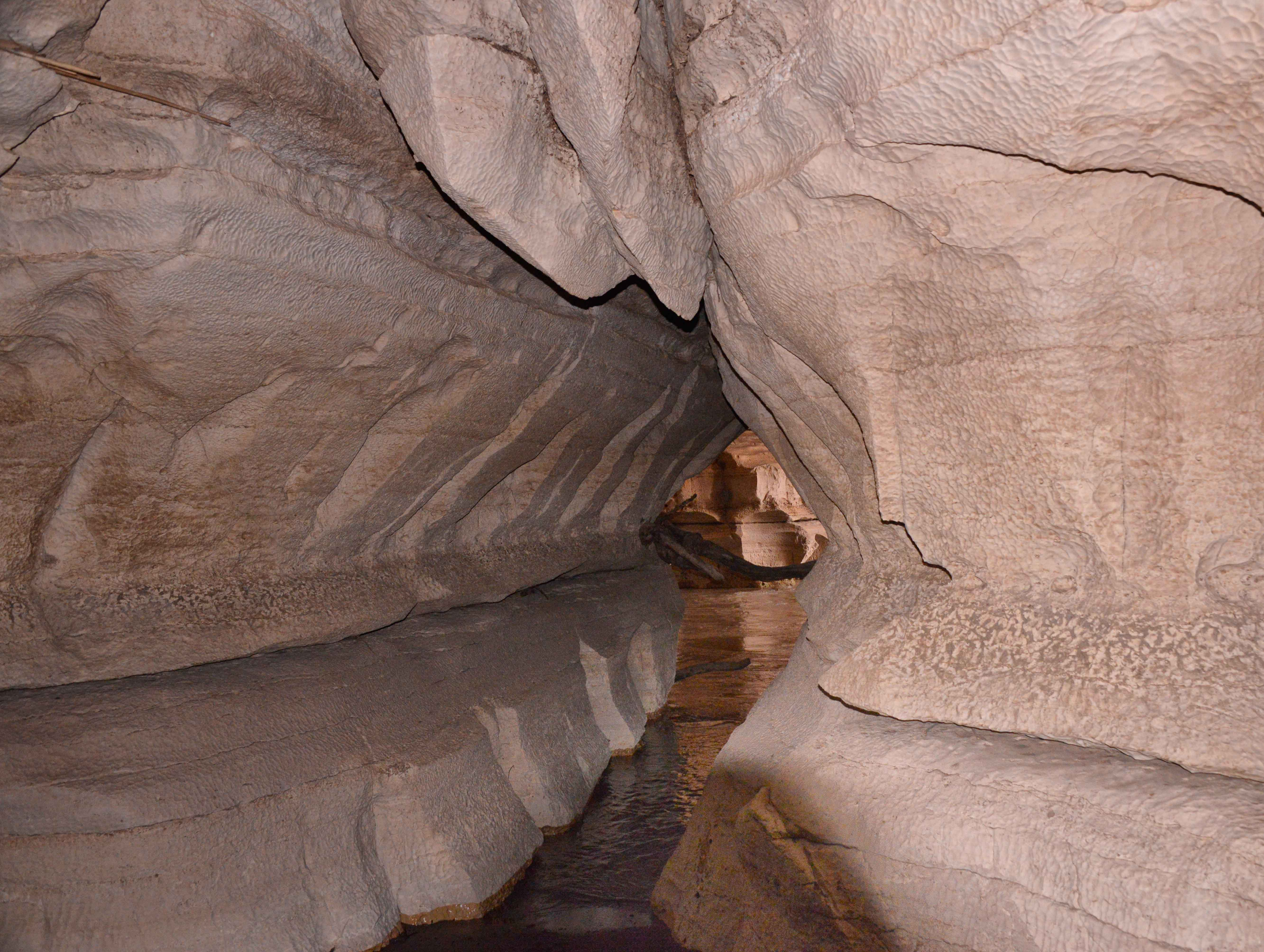
- Tunnel of the cave

- Location within Ethiopia
- Location: East Bale Province, Oromia Region, Ethiopia
- Coordinates: 6°54′22.7″N 40°50′41.6″E
- Length: 15.1 kilometres (9.4 mi)
- Discovery: 1897
- Access: Yes

Sof Omar Caves is the longest cave in Ethiopia at 15.1 kilometres (9.4 mi) long. When surveyed in 1972, it was the longest cave in Africa. Since then explorations in Madagascar (Marosakabe - 113km) and Algeria (Rhar Bou Ma’za - the Tafna River Cave 18.4 km) have overtaken it. It is situated to the east of Ginnir, in the East Bale Zone of the Oromia Region in southeastern Ethiopia, through which the Weyib River (Gestro River) flows. It sinks at the Ayiew Maco entrance and reappears at the Holuca resurgence 1 kilometre (0.62 mi) away. According to tradition Sof Omar was the name of a Muslim holy man who lived in the area and Ayiew the name of his daughter. Maco and Holuca are local words for 'name' and "cave", respectively. Long a religious center, it is sacred both to Islam and the local Oromo traditional religion. The caves are known for their many pillars, particularly in the "Chamber of Columns". As of 2011, the site was added on UNESCO tentative list, still to be considered for a possible inscription.

== History of exploration ==
The explorer Arthur Donaldson Smith recorded his visit to the cave in 1894. An Italian expedition also visited in 1913. In 1934, Henri Breuil conducted archaeological investigations in the area. The Italians almost certainly visited the cave during the Italian occupation of Ethiopia, but apparently none of these early explorers made a through trip from Ayiew Maco to Holuca.

In 1967, Eric Robson, Chris Clapham and Kabir Ahmed explored and surveyed the cave, recording 8 km of passage. Following this the Ethiopian Tourist Board published a brochure about the cave. Although the area was not easily accessible and the organized adventure tourist industry did not yet exist, a few intrepid visitors made the trip to the then remote cave.

In February 1971 Professor Théodore Monod of the Muséum national d'histoire naturelle in France, Bill Morton (ex Manchester University Speleological Society caver), a geologist at Haile Selassie I University, and Ato Mezmure Hailemeskale recorded another 1 km new passages to the known cave. In the same year Dick Ashford and Malcolm Largen of Haile Selassie University made a study of some of the bats in the cave.

In 1972, a British Expedition to Ethiopia arrived with a team which included Dick Ramsden and Tim Renvoize (Preston Caving Club), Simon Amatt (Birmingham Plytechnic Karabiner Club), Dave Catlin (University of Bradford Pothole Club), Paul Ramsden (Whernside Manor Scout Centre), Terry Raynor (9th and 12th Royal Lancers) and Steve Worthington (Sheffield University Speleological Society). With some initial help from Bill Morton the group made a systematic exploration and survey of the Sof Omar caves and published a full report of their findings in Transactions of the Cave Research Group of Great Britain. The team discovered 6.1 kilometres (3.8 mi) of new passages, bringing the survey total to 15.1 kilometres (9.4 mi).

== Topography ==
Approaching from Goro, at Sof Omar the scrubby bush steeply drops 90 m into a canyon. The Web river makes its way from the 4,300 metres (14,100 ft) high Bale Mountains through a 150 kilometres (93 mi) wide outcrop of Anatole limestone to the cave. In earlier times the river made a sharp left meander. At some point the limestone dissolved producing a series of phreatic passages, which became big enough to capture the whole flow of the Web river. Eventually the river abandoned the meander, creating a dry valley running from the cave sink at Ayiew Maco to the resurgence at Holuca. Sof Omar village is situated close to Ayiew Maco in the dry valley. Infill into the valley makes it rise to a high point of about 45 m above the Web, before it drops away to a pebble beach downstream of Holuca.

The other dominant feature is a large shakehole 100 metres (330 ft) wide and 60 metres (200 ft) deep and found on the basalt plateau directly above the cave.

== Description ==
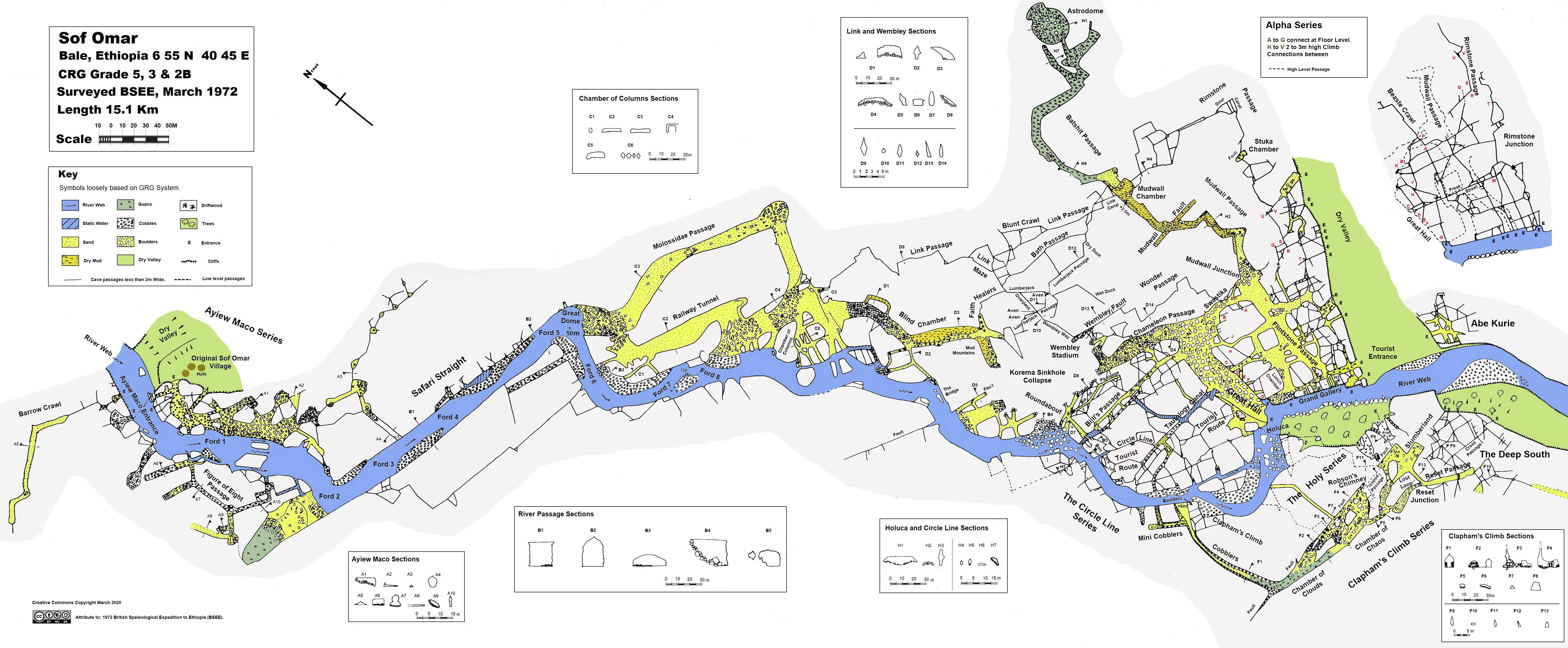
Surveyed by the 1972 British Speleological Expedition to Ethiopia.

The cave is formed along a network of joints: one set runs approximately north to south and the other east to west. This zig-zag of passages runs in an approximately southeasterly direction. Sof Omar has 42 entrances, but generally only four are useful for gaining entrance:

- Two upstream Village Entrances (one to the east and one to the west of the village)
- The Tourist Entrance downstream from the Holuca Resurgence at a point where the abandoned meander forming the dry valley rejoins the Web river
- A right bank entrance downstream of Holuca accessing the Deep South part of the Clapham's Climb Series.

Entering the cave via either of the Village Entrances the visitor passes a shrine used by the locals. The Ayiew Maco Series is a set of interconnecting passages of varying in width between 1 m and 10 m. Several can be passed through to the pebble beach on the left bank of the river. A less complex series of passages exists on the right bank. These probably connected to those on the left bank until severed by the vadose action of the Web cutting the river passage deeper.

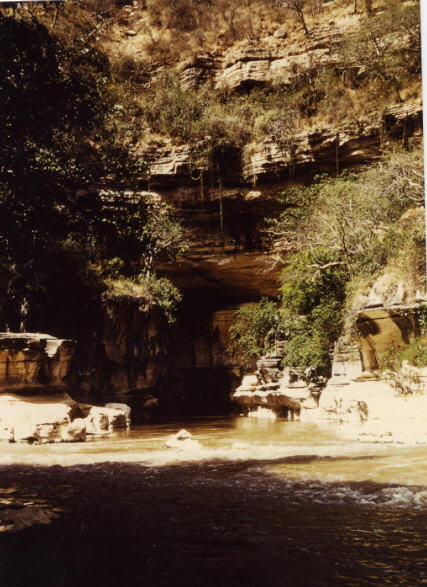
The Web river disappearing into the Ayiew Maco entrance of Sof Omar Caves. The dry valley, Sof Omar Village and Village Entrances are off to the left.

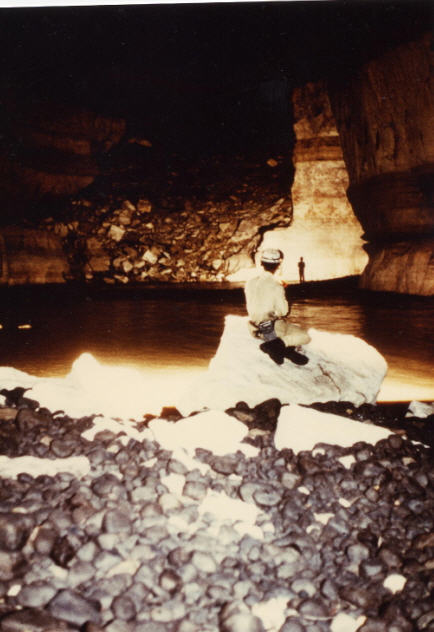
Safari Straight looking across Ford 5, in the distance the river turns sharply right at the Great Dome. The boulder slope is the start of Molossadie passage.

The passage at the pebble beach is about 40 m wide—the widest passage in the cave. At the downstream end of the beach the river disappears between two columns. The continuation crosses the Web at Ford 1 and follows the figure-eight passage until the river is reached again at Ford 2. The river meanders down this 15 m wide, 20 m high rectangular passage for 300 m.

The way onward involves crossing and re-crossing the river from cobble beach to cobble beach at Fords 2, 3, 4 and 5. Small passages exist on both sides. The beach ends after Ford 5 under the 50 m high Great Dome. On the opposite bank a steep rise leads to Molossadie Passage. The deep, short Ford 6, Ford 7 and Ford 8 lead to a cobble beach and the entrance into the Chamber of Columns. Exiting Ford 6 on the left bank it is possible to enter the Railway Tunnel passage, which offers an alternative route into the Molossadie passage and bypasses Fords 7 and 8 into the Chamber of Columns.

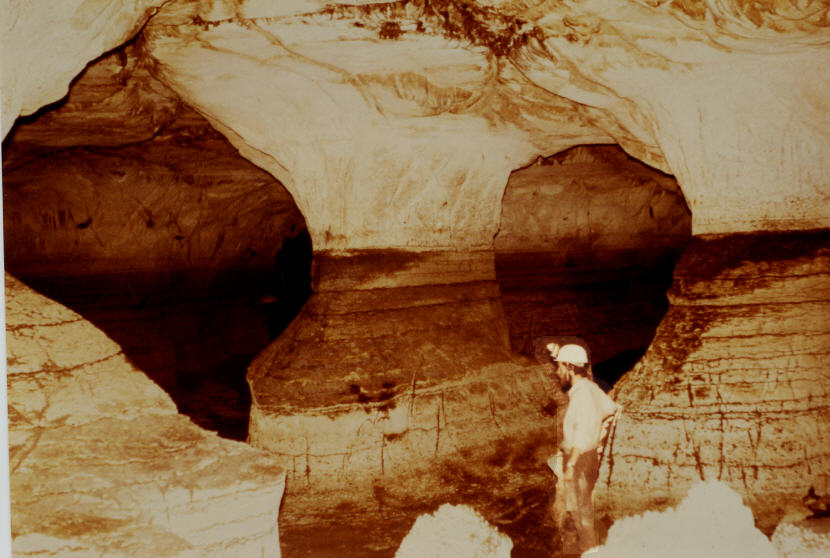
Chamber of Columns: a series of interconnected phreatic arches; the mud marks indicate the level of flooding during the rainy season.

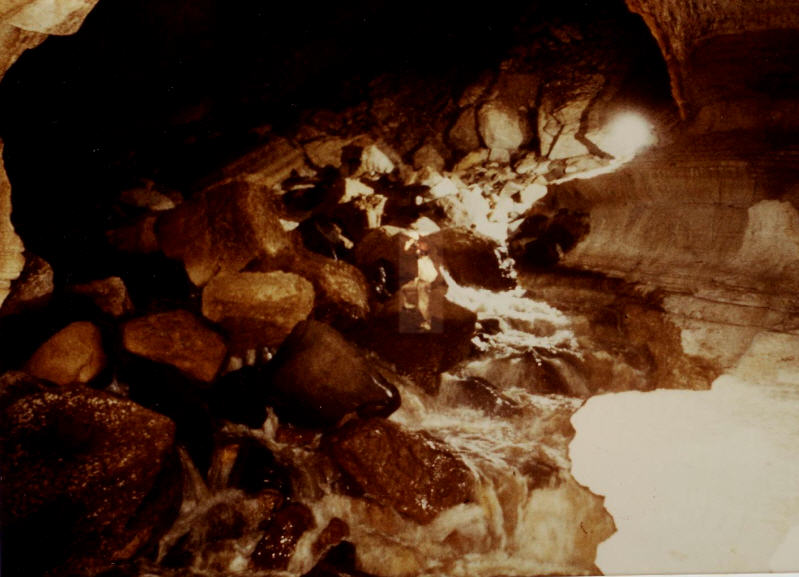
Big Rapids: created by the shakehole collapse and subsequent erosion by the underground river.

The Chamber of Columns is a unique feature in the world of caves. It looks like a wide passage leaving the Web before sweeping back to the river about 100 m downstream. The passage circumnavigates a cluster of thick columns densely packed in the centre of chamber. The Railway Tunnel and Molossadie Passage enter the chamber from the north.

The river passage continues from the Chamber of Columns meandering for about 200 m to the Big Rapids. This striking feature is formed from a jumble of huge boulders, well worn by the actions of the river. The river passage continues around a curve for about 250 m before flowing around a massive boulder into the sunlight at the Holuca Resurgence. The Web continues running through a canyon. About 250 m downstream the dry valley appears on the left bank.

The left side of the canyon from the resurgence to the dry valley is riddled with passages breaking out into the canyon walls, forming many of the unusable entrances to the cave. Most of these are small passages exposed as the river cut its way down. The exception is the 25 m wide Great Hall that follows the north – south joint pattern breaking into the canyon at the resurgence. Hidden at the end of the Great Hall behind boulders is the hard-to-find Chameleon Passage. This runs along the east–west joint pattern. Some small passages lead from Chameleon to Blank Passage and back to the Big Rapids. Several small passages run from Blank Passage to Boulder Chokes.

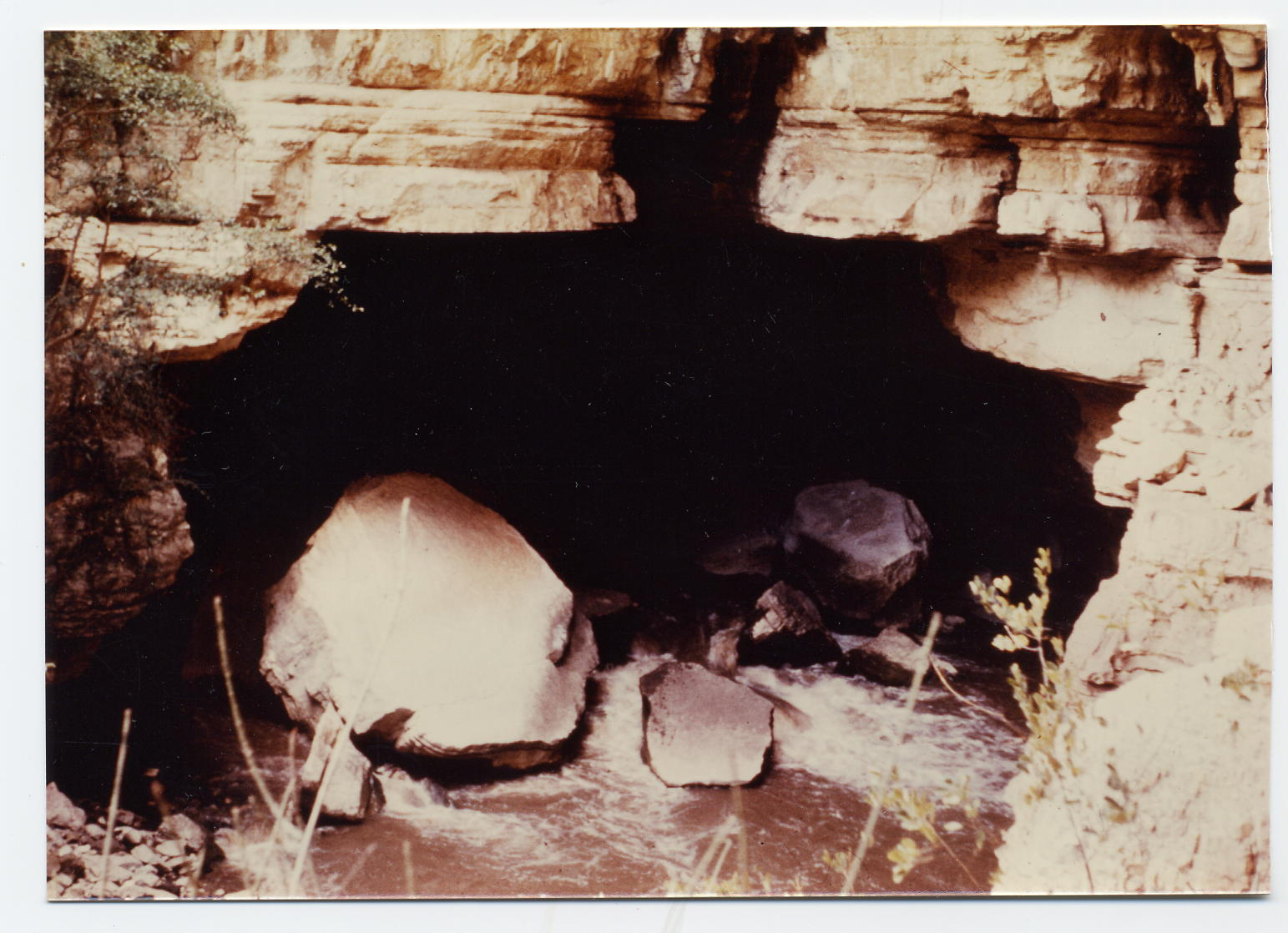
The Holuca Resurgence: The fallen boulder is the size of a room. It shows the severity of the collapse in the cave. The lack of erosion indicates this was a relatively recent event.

The area surrounded by the river, Great Hall, Chameleon and Blank Passage, contains a criss-cross labyrinth of passages. Two of the most significant, Bill's Passage and Tautology Passage, run between the river and the Great Hall. These are high rift passages, and climbing them gives access to the 35 m long Balcony that overlooks the Big Rapids 7 m below.

Running parallel to the Great Hall and interconnected to it via several passages is Flintstone Passage. This splits into many different passages that break into the left bank of the canyon downstream of Holuca. Away from the river, Flintstone runs into another of the caves' unique passages, Mudwall Passage, which has filled with mud almost to the 3 m high roof. Following the infilling process a vadose trench has been cut the length of the passage revealing that the mud is formed of thin laminations.

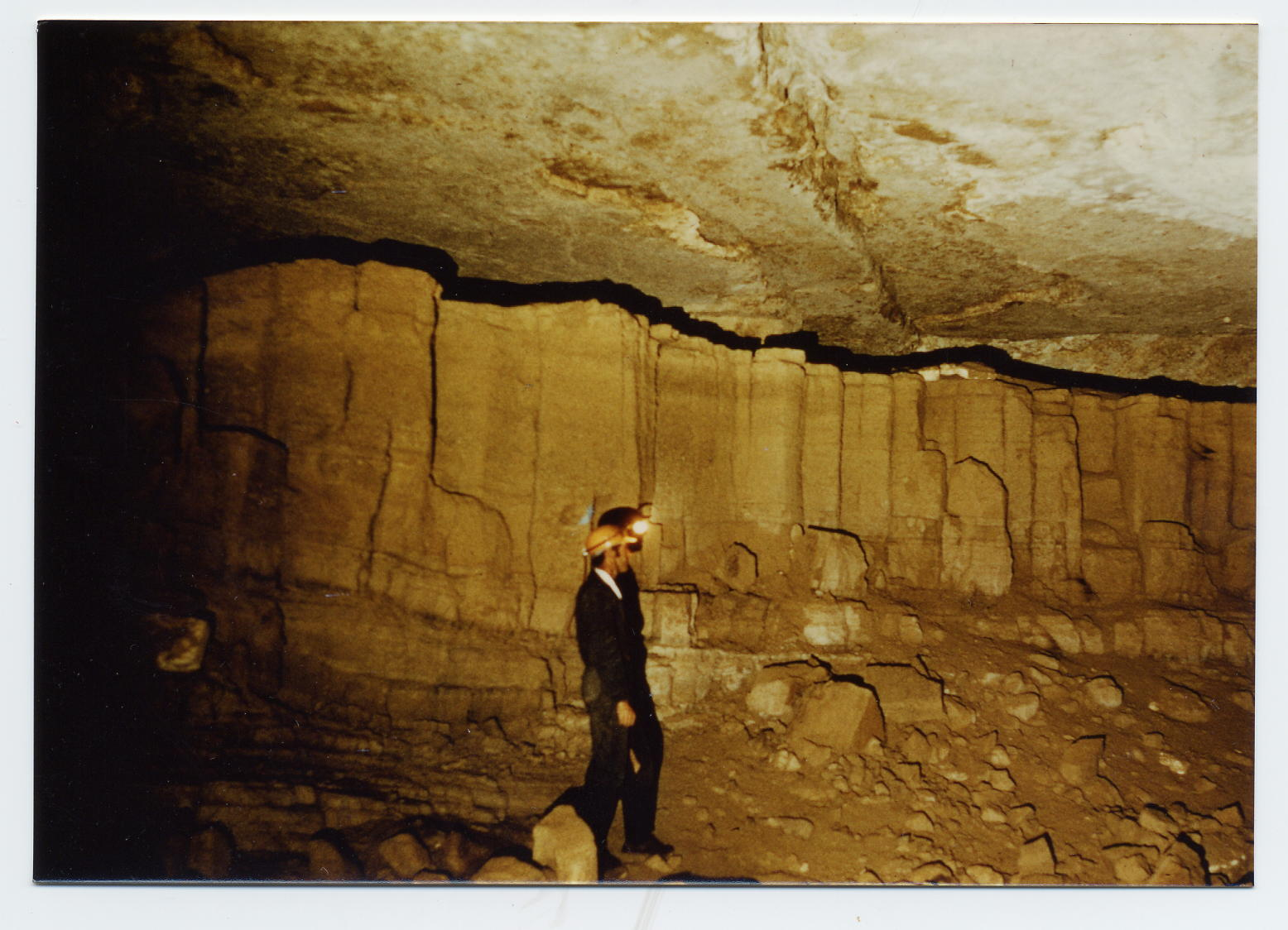
Mudwall Passage: the passage shows the mud strata caused by annual floods.

After 200 m the Mudwall Passage enters into the small Mudwall Chamber. This has been formed by water coming from Link Passage on the west cutting across the line of the Mudwall Passage disappearing into Rimstone Passage to the east. It is this flow of water that formed the chamber. Climbing out of Mudwall Chamber leads to Batshit Passage, whose floor is knee deep in guano. This leads to the large chamber, the Astrodome, which houses a large colony of bats.

Link Passage is a narrow rift passage that links back to the Chamber of Columns. A series of small passages at two levels leave Link Passage and heads towards the river passage. One of these leads into the wide Blind Passage, which also emerges into the Chamber of Columns. The upper passage is a tight crawl into the pretentiously named Wembley Stadium. This passage is formed in a fault. The survey of the British expedition in 1972 showed that the Wembley Fault extended from a right bank passage on the river to Wembley Stadium, Mudwall and Rimstone Passages.

The shakehole on the plateau is centred on the Wembley Fault line. Obviously the fault played a significant role in the major collapse that created the shakehole. The underground debris from the collapse forms the Big Rapids and is responsible for the boulder chokes seen near Blank Passage.
