= Andranomavo =

- Location in Madagascar
- Coordinates: 16°34′S 45°35′E
- Country: Madagascar
- Region: Boeny
- District: Soalala
- Elevation: 144 m (472 ft)

Population (2001)
  - Total: 27,000
- Time zone: UTC3 (EAT)

Andranomavo is a town and commune (Malagasy: kaominina) in Madagascar. It belongs to the district of Soalala, which is a part of Boeny Region. The population of the commune was estimated to be approximately 27,000 in 2001census.

Andranomavo is served by a local airport. Primary and junior level secondary education are available in town. The majority 90% of the population of the commune are farmers. The most important crops are rice and raffia palm, while other important agricultural products are sugarcane and cassava. Services provide employment for 10% of the population.
