= Tjoarvekrajgge =

Cave in Sørfold, Norway

Coordinates: 67°36′35″N 15°41′31″E

Tjoarvekrajgge or Čoarvvekraigi (English: The Reindeer Antler Cave) is a cave in the Bonådalen valley in Sørfold Municipality in Nordland county, Norway. It has a measured depth of 497 metres (1,631 ft) and explored length of more than 25 kilometres (16 mi), and is the longest cave in Scandinavia.
