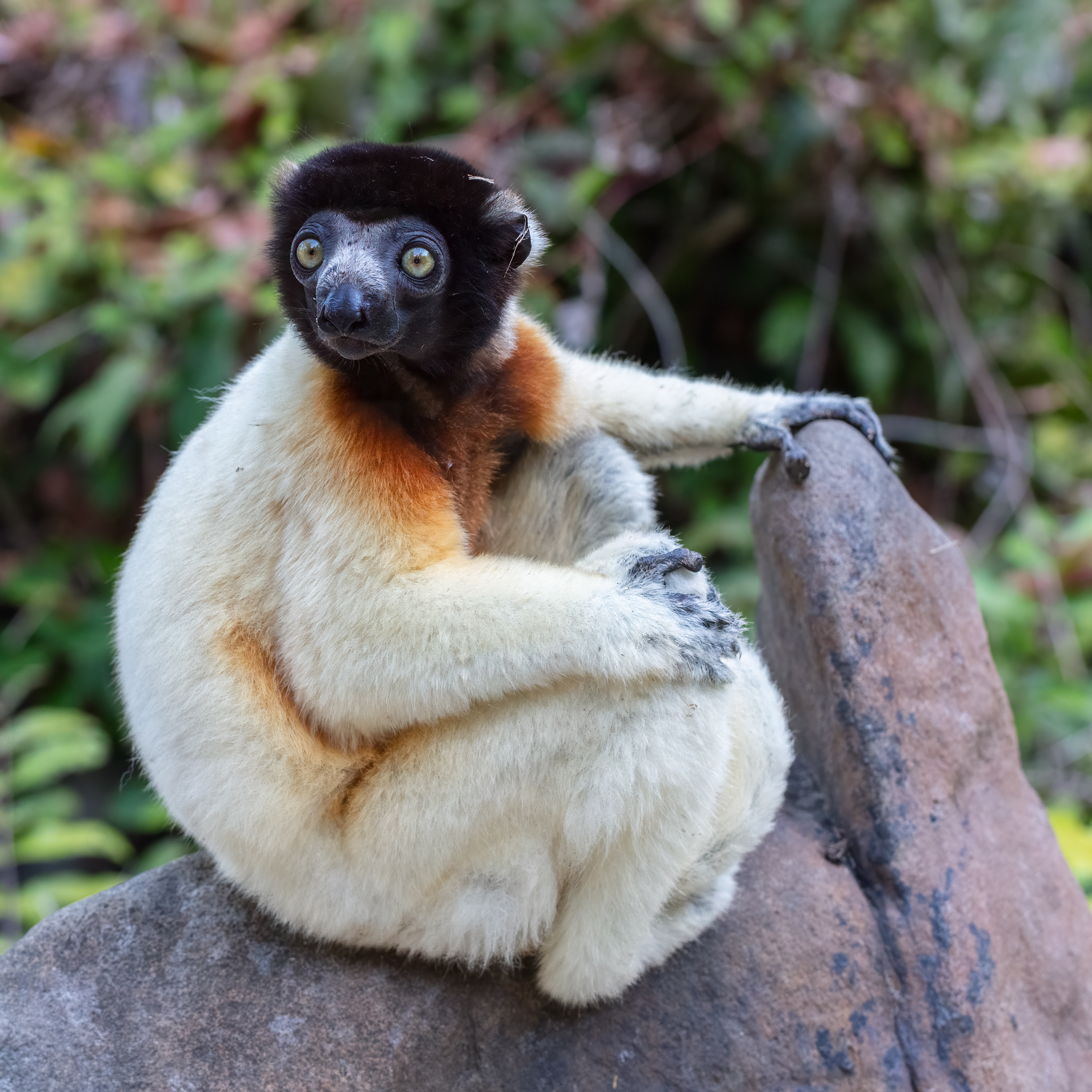

Conservation status
- Critically Endangered (IUCN 3.1)
- CITES Appendix I

Scientific classification
- Kingdom: Animalia
- Phylum: Chordata
- Class: Mammalia
- Infraclass: Placentalia
- Order: Primates
- Suborder: Strepsirrhini
- Family: Indriidae
- Genus: Propithecus
- Species: P. coronatus

Binomial name
- Propithecus coronatus A. Milne-Edwards, 1871
- Distribution of P. coronatus

Synonyms
- Propithecus deckenii damanus Pollen & Schlegel, 1876; Propithecus deckenii coronatus A. Milne-Edwards, 1871

= Crowned sifaka =

Species of mammal

The crowned sifaka (Propithecus coronatus) is a sifaka endemic to western Madagascar, a part of the world where nature and its biological diversity faces enormous and devastating consequences resulting from anthropogenic activities. It is a species of lemur belonging to the Indriidae family, it is of comparable size to the Golden-crowned sifaka and up to a meter in length, of which 47-57 centimeters are tail. The species is an arboreal vertical climber and leaper whose diet consists of leaves, fruits and flowers. It is threatened by habitat destruction caused by human activities and is currently classified as critically endangered by the IUCN. Conservation planning needs to take local people needs and views into account in order to be successful over the long term.

== Taxonomy ==
The crowned sifaka was formerly believed to be a subspecies of either Verreaux's sifaka or Von der Decken's sifaka, but is now considered a valid species following a 2007 analysis of the cranium. Melanistic individuals observed in the southern part of its range, in areas neighboring Verreaux's sifaka and Von der Decken's sifaka s range, are the results of hybridation of Crowned sifakas with individuals of these two species. Only two melanistic forms have been documented so far: an intermediate and a dark one.

== Description ==
The crowned sifaka is a medium-sized sifaka who has a total length of 87 to 102 centimeters, of which 47-57 centimeters are tail, and 39.5 - 45.5 cm are the head and body. Males weigh 3.5-4.5 kg and 3.5-5.0 kg for females. It is of comparable size to the golden-crowned sifaka, Von der Decken's sifaka and Verreaux's sifaka. The crowned sifaka is characterized by a creamy white body with tinges of golden brown around the shoulder region, upper chest and back with a dark chocolate or black head with white ear tufts. Their dark grey face is hairless and they have a white tail. Occasionally a pale patch across the bridge of the nose may be present. Crown sifaka color variations occur more commonly in the lower regions of the sifakas range between the Mahavavy and Manombolo rivers. Melanistic forms have been documented, with most occurrences observed where the southern limit of its range overlaps with that of P. deckenii.This apparent color variation among groups of Crowned sifakas living in the southern edges of their range, which they share with their close relatives P. deckenii and P. verrauxi, is the product of the gene flow of Crowned Sifakas with its neighboring species.

== Distribution and habitat ==
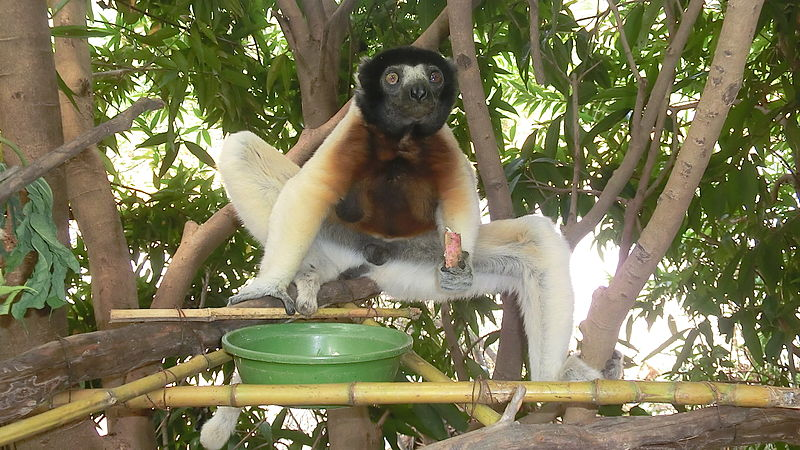
A captive individual

The crowned sifaka is found in the mangroves and dry deciduous and riparian forests of northwest Madagascar. Surveys have shown in the northern range of its habitat the crowned sifaka inhabits the forest between the Mahavavy River and Betsiboka River and extending south to the region of highly fragmented forests around the Tsiribihina River, Mahajilo River, and Mania River. The species hasn't been reported southern than Ambolando, near Dabolava. It is believed that Mania River is the southern limit of its range, where it meets with P. verrauxi's range. The total population size in 2014 was estimated as 4,000-36,000 individuals, at densities of 46-309 individuals/km^{2} in different-sized forest fragments, with an average group size of 2-8 individuals per group. Estimates remain uncertain since only part of the range has been surveyed so far. Total area of occupancy is thought to be 2,690-4,493 km^{2}. Furthermore, while it has been assessed by the IUCN that its population has decreased by at least 80% in the last 3 decades, it is expected to decrease by another 80% in the following 3 decades.

== Ecology ==
The crowned sifaka is a diurnal animal, primarily active during the day. It spends a majority of its time resting with the remainder mostly devoted to feeding. It frequents the upper stories of large trees and often is found in tree crowns. Depending on season, it feeds on young or mature leaves, ripe and unripe fruits and great quantities of flowers. This species is essential for the biodiversity of its habitat since it is unconsciously and constantly working on restoring it. They do so through the scattering of their excrements containing seeds of various ingested fruits .

Group size is between 2 and 8 individuals and contains a balanced number of females and males in each group. One dominant female is found in each group. Social behavior within groups entails mostly allogrooming of other group members, agonistic behavior, and play as well as scent marking and call-localization. Reproduction is seasonal, with gestation lasting 5–6 months and estrus lasting 4 months. Within the typical estrus period a female may have 3-5 estruses per reproductive season. Reproduction in the crowned sifaka has rarely been observed, and what little is known about it has been documented in the captive population at the Paris Zoological Park. However, it is known that reproduction process is very low for the species, with females having new offsprings only every 2 to 3 years.

== Conservation ==
The very restricted range and fragmented populations of the crowned sifaka are major concerns for the continuation of this species. Habitat destruction, forest fragmentation, slash and burn agriculture, capture for illegal pet trade, and illegal hunting constitute major threats. These disruptions, coupled with the slow pace at which the species reproduce, slows even more the regeneration of the species and its habitats. The species is currently listed by the IUCN Red List as critically endangered according to A2acd criteria, and is listed as CITES Appendix I. Additionally, the crowned sifaka population is expected to decline by another 32% in the nearby future due to habitat fragmentation and the resulting time-lagged effect. This effect can be described as the postponed impoverishment of a forest fragment conditions and resources essential for the inhabiting populations, after being separated and isolated from the rest of the forest for a certain period of time. Some of the larger populations are found in protected areas, however much of its range remain relatively unexplored as they are labeled as politically "dangerous" zones. Looking more in depth into these area is of critical need for the long term survival of this species. Conservation measures should be enforced in these area if we want to preserve the color variations of P. coronatus and be able to study it more closely to get a better understanding of how these varying fur pigmentations occur. The 2009 Malagasy political crisis led to lawlessness across Madagascar and ultimately led to increased poaching of the sifaka for food as a delicacy in restaurants. However, in order to establish effective conservation measures, a greater participation of locals would be required, along with gaining more knowledge about the species, and a need to focus on ensuring that the rest of available suitable habitats are protected along with an intent to reconnect forest fragments. The first successful captive breeding population of crowned sifaka happened in 1994 and was coordinated by the Paris Zoological Park in Paris under the European Endangered Species Programme (EEP).
