= Katale Khor =

Cave in Iran

Coordinates: 35°50′08″N 48°09′42″E

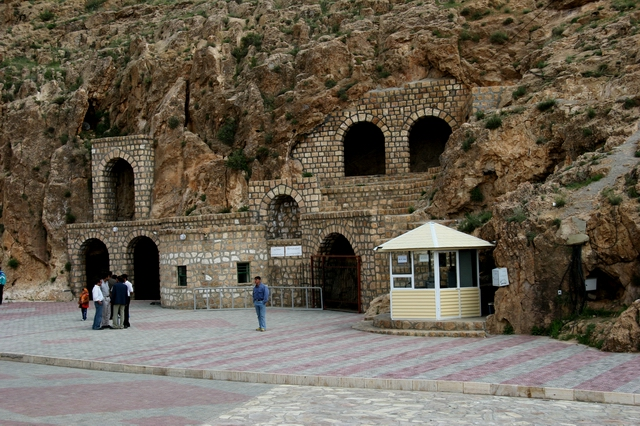
Katale Khor.

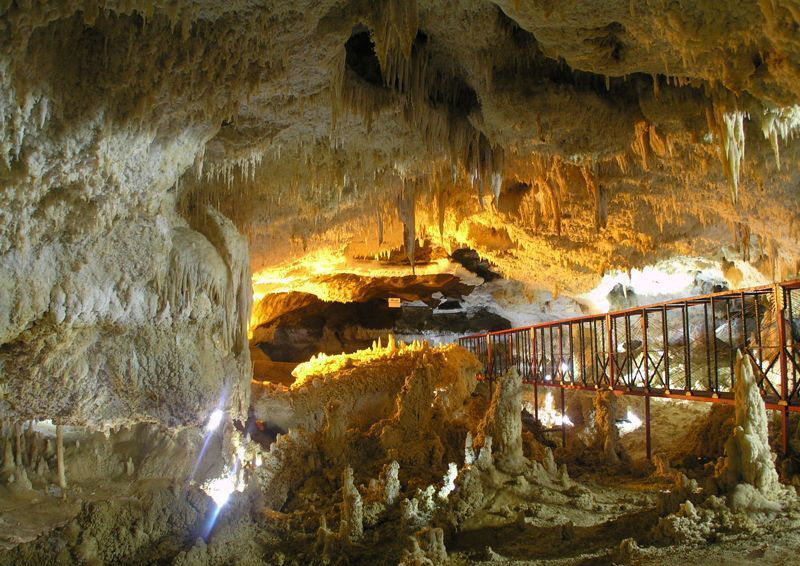

Katale Khor (Persian: کتله‌خور, Azerbaijani: کتله خور) is a cave located in Zanjan Province, Iran. It is situated 120 km (75 mi) south of Zanjan city and is about 410 km (250 mi) from Tehran. The name, Katale Khor, means "mount of the sun". The cave was discovered about 90 years ago. It is currently the longest cave of the country with 12,860 m (42,190 ft) of surveyed cave passages.
