= Baie de Baly National Park =

National park in Madagascar

- IUCN category II (national park)
- Location within Madagascar
- Location: Soalala District, Boeny, Madagascar
- Nearest city: Sakaraha, Tulear
- Coordinates: 16°5′S 45°14′E
- Area: 571.42 km^{2} (220.63 sq mi)
- Established: 18 December 1997
- Governing body: Madagascar National Parks Association
- Website: www.parcs-madagascar.com/parcs/baie_de_baly.php

Baie de Baly National Park is a park in northern Madagascar.

== Geography ==
Baie de Baly National Park or Baly Bay National Park is situated in Soalala District in the region of Boeny, close to Soalala and Ambohipaky, approximately 150 kilometres (93 mi) to the next major city Mahajanga. The Tsingy de Namoroka National Park borders this park. Vegetation consist of dry deciduous forests, scrub-shrub or bamboo shrub, mangroves, lakes and swamps mixed with savanna. Its southern border is formed by the Kapiloza River and the Andranomavo River crosses the park. It is bordered in the north by the Mozambique Channel and in the east by the Bay of Marambitsy.

== Flora and fauna ==
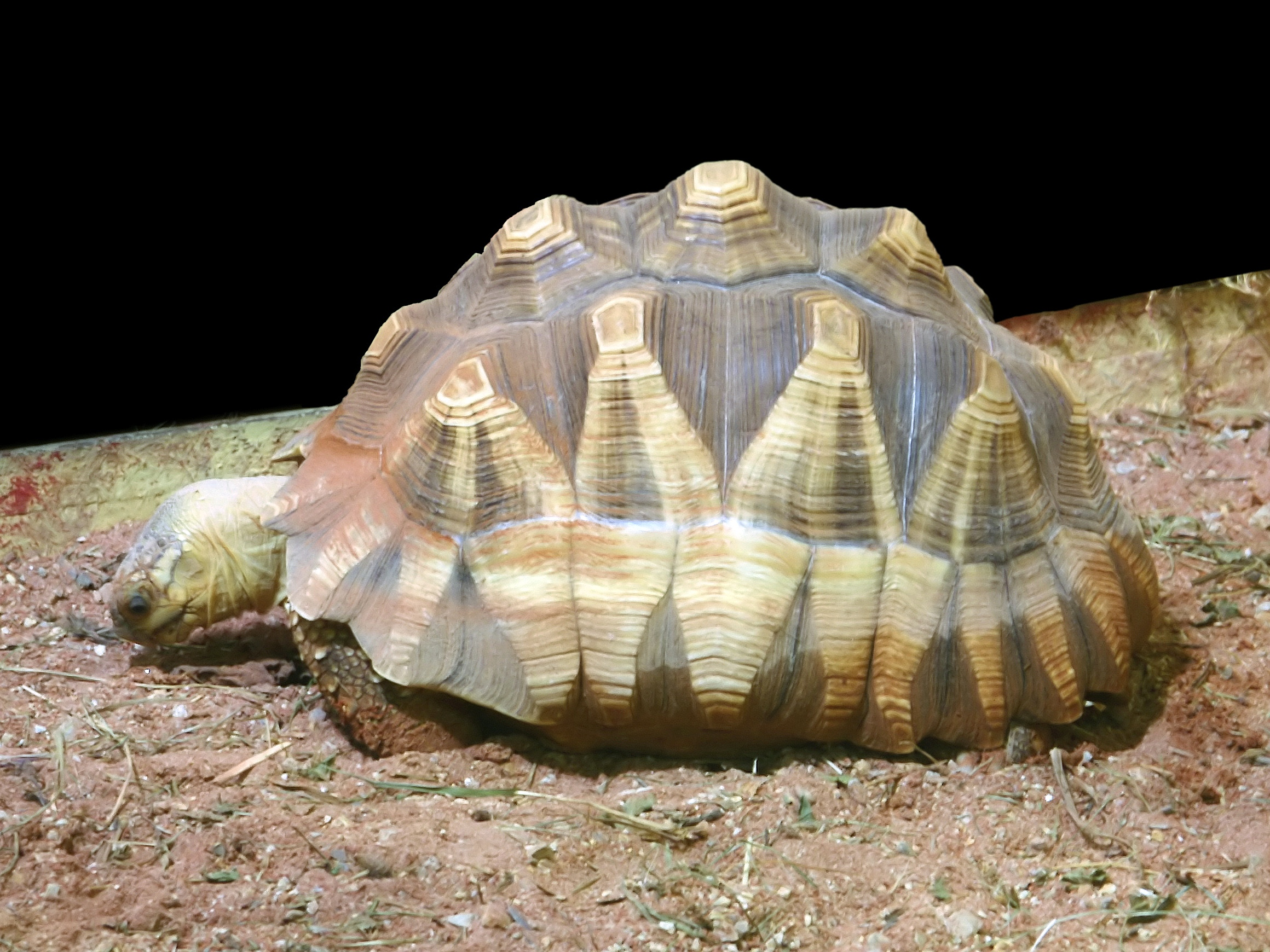
Angonoka tortoise

The Baie de Baly National Park is the only known natural habitat of the critically endangered Angonoka tortoise or ploughshare tortoise (Astrochelys yniphora). Other rare animals found in this park is the Madagascan sideneck turtle (Erymnochelys madagascariensis), as well as the dugong, a marine mammal and the Madagascar fish eagle. There are also thirteen species of mammals, (six primates), 37 reptile species, eight amphibian species and 122 species of birds. There is also the Perrierbambus madagascariensis, an endemic bamboo. The poisonous tree, Erythrophleum couminga (locally named komanga) is also endemic to this region and can be found in and outside the park. It is a very hard wood but cannot be used for cooking as its fumes contain a poison.

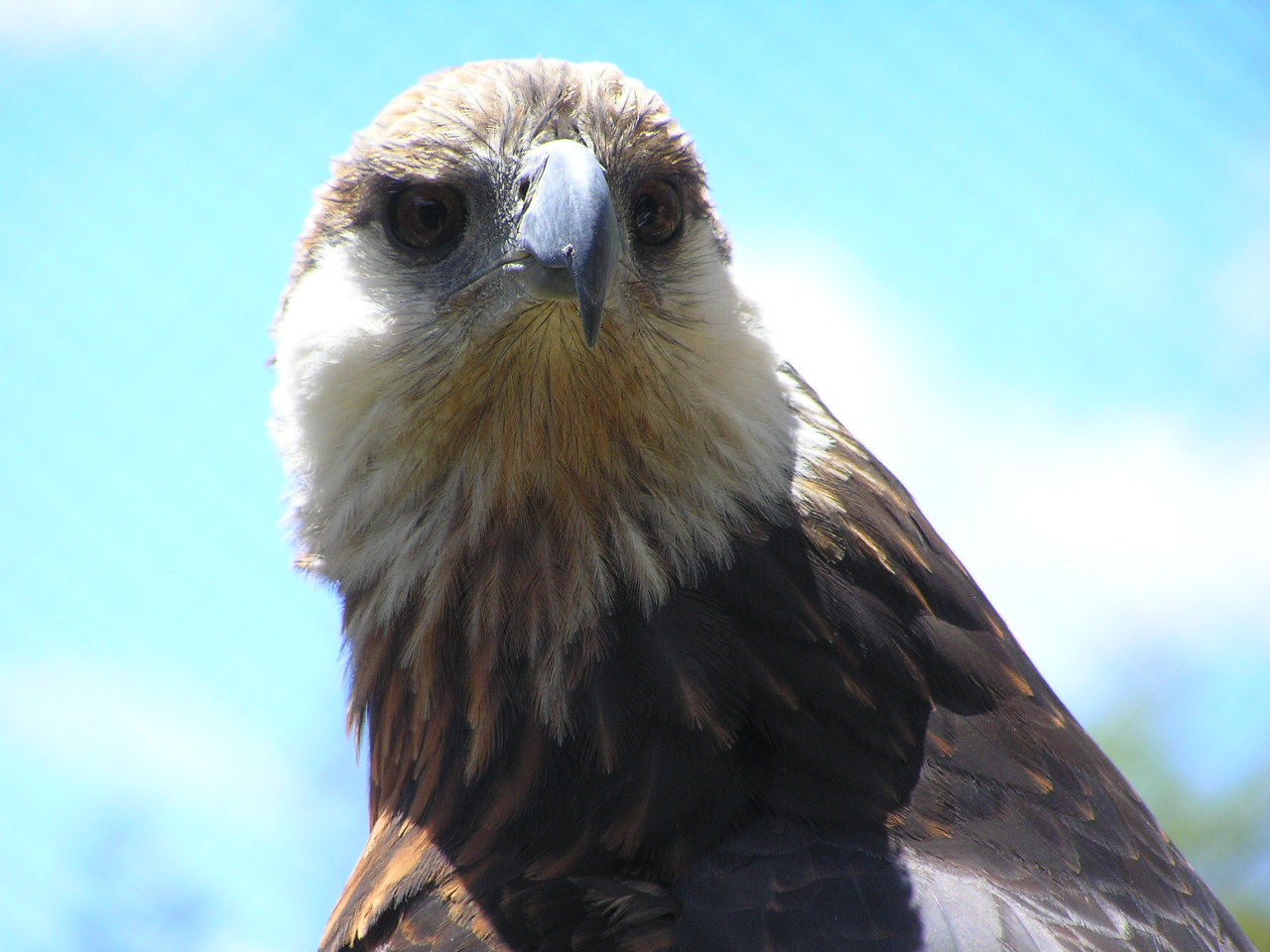
Madagascar fish eagle

== See also ==
- List of national parks of Madagascar
- Fauna of Madagascar
- Boeny
- Tsingy de Namoroka Strict Nature Reserve
