= Ambohipaky =

- Location in Madagascar
- Coordinates: 16°25′S 44°58′E
- Country: Madagascar
- Region: Boeny
- District: Soalala
- Elevation: 34 m (112 ft)

Population (2001)
  - Total: 7,000
- Time zone: UTC3 (EAT)
- Climate: Aw

Ambohipaky is a town and commune (Malagasy: kaominina) in Madagascar. It belongs to the district of Soalala, which is a part of Boeny Region. The population of the commune was estimated to be approximately 7,000 in 2001 commune census.

Only primary schooling is available. The majority 80% of the population of the commune are farmers, while an additional 19% receives their livelihood from raising livestock. The most important crop is rice, while other important products are maize, cassava and raffia palm. Services provide employment for 1% of the population.
