= Tsingy de Namoroka National Park =

National park in Madagascar

- IUCN category II (national park)
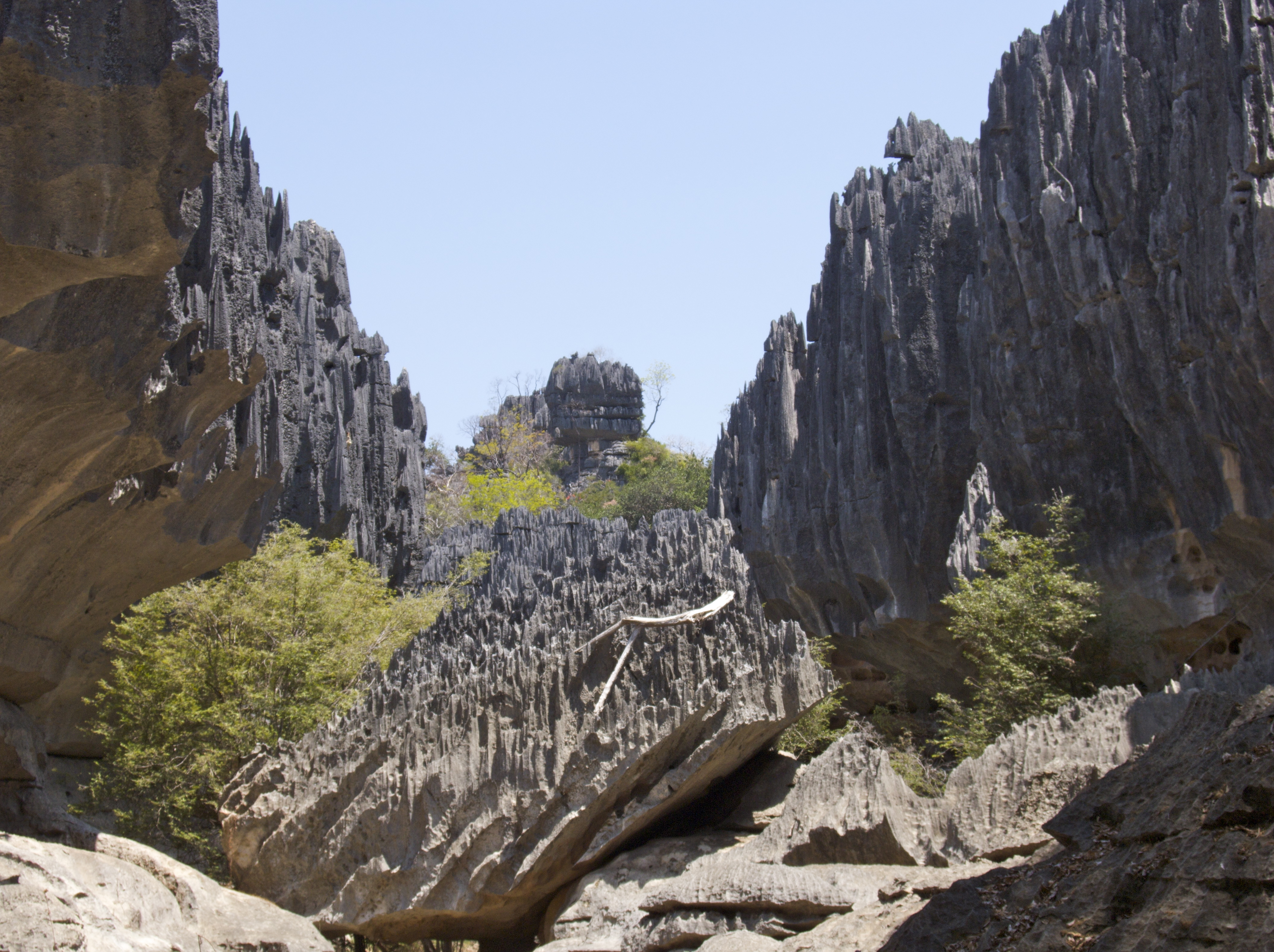
- Tsingy located at Tsingy de Namoroka National Park

- Location within Madagascar
- Location: Northwestern Madagascar
- Nearest city: Soalala, Mahajanga
- Coordinates: 16°28′S 45°20′E
- Area: 220.71 km^{2} (85.22 sq mi)
- Established: 1927
- Governing body: Madagascar National Parks Association (PNM-ANGAP)
- Website: www.parcs-madagascar.com/fiche-aire-protegee_en.php?Ap=28

Tsingy de Namoroka National Park, formerly known as Tsingy de Namoroka Strict Nature Reserve, is a national park located in the northwestern part of Madagascar in the Mahajanga Province, specifically, the Soalala District.

== History ==
Namoroka Strict Nature Reserve was established in 1927 and became a special reserve in 1966. It forms a complex with the neighboring Baie de Baly National Park.

== Climate and geography ==
Located in the northwestern part of Madagascar about 50 km (31 mi) south of Soalala, Namoroka has a dry season lasting about seven months with a rainy season lasting only five months. The resulting precipitation is about 115 cm (45 in) per year, while the average temperature hovers around 25 °C (77 °F).

The park is known for its tsingy walls, caves, canyons, and natural swimming pools. The Marosakabe cave system is 113 km (70 mi) long and is the longest cave in Africa.

== Fauna ==
Like much of Madagascar, Namoroka is known for its abundant and diverse wildlife. Of its over 81 species of birds, 31 are endemic to Madagascar with 23 other species endemic to Madagascar and other neighboring islands.

Namoroka is also home to over 30 species of reptiles, five types of frogs, and 16 mammals, including eight lemurs. Specifically, Namoroka is home to the following lemur species:

- Von der Decken's sifaka
- Red lemur
- Eastern lesser bamboo lemur
- Masoala fork-crowned lemur
- Gray mouse lemur
- Milne-Edwards' sportive lemur
- Fat-tailed dwarf lemur
- Aye-aye

== See also ==
- List of national parks of Madagascar
- Baie de Baly National Park
- Marosakabe cave system
