= Marosakabe cave system =

Cave in Marosalaza region, Madagascar

- Location within Madagascar
- Location: Marosalaza, Mahajanga Province
- Coordinates: 16.45189°S 45.33543°E
- Depth: 50 m (160 ft)
- Length: 113.024 km (70.230 mi)
- Discovery: 2008
- Geology: Limestone
- Entrances: 1

The Marosakabe cave system is a cave in Marosalaza region, Madagascar, the longest in Africa.

The cave is situated in northwestern part of Madagascar in the Mahajanga Province in Namoroka National Park, in a Tsingy area. It is characterized by an extremely high number of fractures, with very pure jurassic limestone, and the void density is very high.

The cave has been explored since 2008 under the coordination of Jean-Nicolas Delaty and Eric Sibert. After 11 expeditions in the remote area, 113 km of cave passages have been explored and surveyed (as of 2018), making it the longest cave in Africa and the 18th longest cave system in the world.

== See also ==
- List of longest caves
