= Paris Zoological Park =

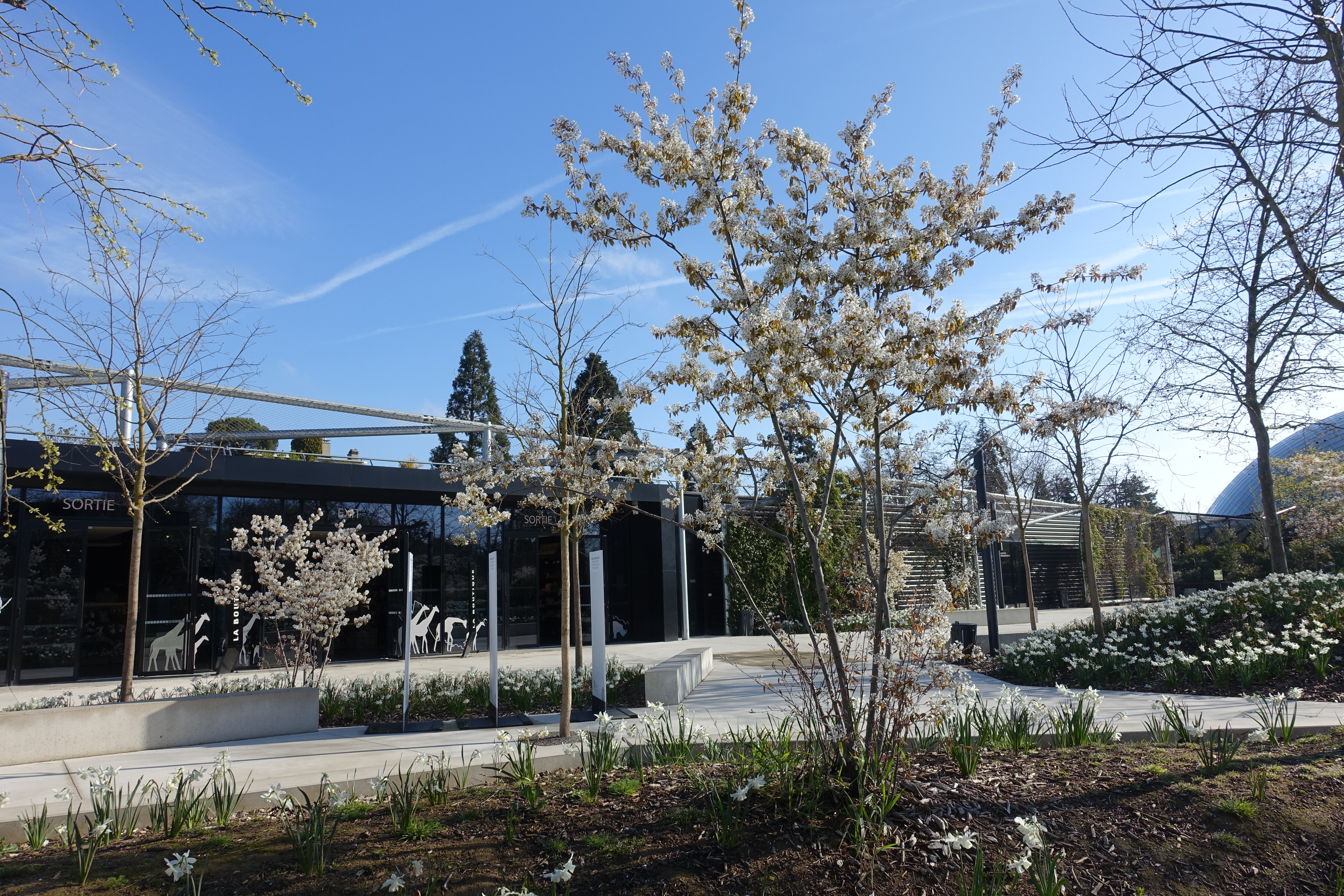
- Interactive map of Paris Zoological Park
- 48.8322°N 2.4186°E
- Date opened: 2 June 1934
- Location: 53, avenue de Saint-Maurice, 75012 Paris, France
- Land area: 14.5 hectares (36 acres)
- No. of animals: 1,000
- No. of species: 180
- Memberships: EAZA
- Website: www.parczoologiquedeparis.fr

The Paris Zoological Park (parc zoologique de Paris), formerly known as the Bois de Vincennes Zoological Park (French pronunciation: [bwɑ d(ə) vɛ̃sɛn]), and commonly called the Vincennes Zoo, is a facility of the National Museum of Natural History, located in the 12th arrondissement of Paris, which covers an area of 14.5 hectares (36 acres) in the Bois de Vincennes. Designed to complement the Ménagerie du Jardin des plantes, this zoo is dedicated to the observation of animal behavior in a more suitable environment. Since its opening in 1934, it is remarkable for its large artificial 65 m (213 ft) high rock, iconic scenery of the park, visible from afar and popularly called the "Big Rock". This zoo include a greenhouse of 4,000 m^{2} (43,000 sq ft) sheltering a tropical rainforest climate.

The zoo was closed between 30 November 2008 and 12 April 2014 after becoming dilapidated and too small for its residents, according to criteria of the twenty-first century. The renovation, which began on 7 December 2011, took place over nearly two and a half years. During this time, the animals except for some giraffes and some bamboo lemurs, were temporarily placed in other zoos in France and abroad. The pens have been fully reviewed and grouped into five major natural environments (called biozones). The work allowed them to reach modern standards for animal welfare, public safety and museology, with increased attention to the respect of the environment.

== Exhibits and attractions ==
=== Patagonia ===
- Vicuña
- Lesser Rhea
- Guanaco
- Patagonia Mara
- Greater Rhea
- South American Sea Lion
- South American Fur Seal
- Humboldt Penguin
- Cougar
- Andean Pudu

=== Madagascar ===
- Black Lemur
- Straw-Colored Fruit Bat
- Rodrigues Flying Fox
- Madagascar Ibis
- Red Fody
- Bernier's Teal
- Greater Vasa Parrot
- Greater Bamboo Lemur
- Panther Chameleon
- Radiated Tortoise
- Malagasy Tree Boa
- Tomato Frog
- Spider Tortoise
- Madagascar Girdled Lizard
- Madagascar Ground Boa
- Madagascar Giant Day Gecko
- Fossa
- Black-and-White Ruffed Lemur
- Mongoose Lemur
- Ring-Tailed Lemur
- Crowned Lemur
- Red-Bellied Lemur
- Crowned Sifaka
