= Taolagnaro District =

Fort-Dauphin district Taolagnaro district, Tolagnaro
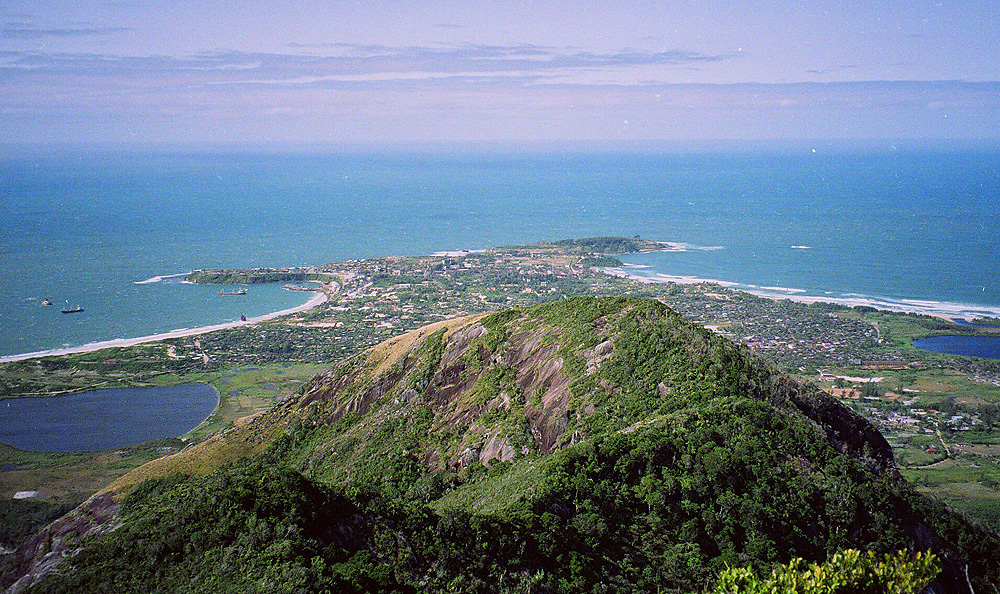

- Location of Fort-Dauphin in Madagascar
- Coordinates: 25°01′57″S 46°59′00″E
- Country: Madagascar
- Region: Anosy
- Elevation: 27 m (89 ft)
- Time zone: East Africa Time (GMT+3)
- Postal code: 614

The district of Taolagnaro (or: Fort Dauphin district) is a district of Anosy in Madagascar.

== Communes ==
The district is further divided into 24 communes:

- Ambatoabo
- Ampasimena
- Ampasy Nahampoa
- Analamary
- Analapatsy
- Andranombory
- Ankaramena
- Bevoay
- Enakara-Haut
- Enaniliha
- Fenoevo
- Iabakoho
- Ifarantsa
- Isaka-Ivondro
- Mahatalaky
- Manambaro
- Manantenina
- Mandiso
- Mandromodromotra
- Ranomafana
- Ranopiso
- Sarasambo
- Soanierana
- Taolanaro

== Nature ==
- Lavasoa-Ambatotsirongorongo Mountains, 30 km west of Taolanaro (Ranopiso, Ankaramena, Sarasambo)
- Sainte Luce Reserve
- Andohahela National Park
- Tsitongambarika forest in Ampasy Nahampoa.

== Roads ==
- the National Road 12a, from Taolanaro to Vangaindrano.
- the National Road 13, from Taolanaro to Ambovombe and Ihosy.

== Airport ==
- Tolagnaro Airport

== Seaport ==
- Port d'Ehoala
