= Ampasy Nahampoa =

Ampasy Nahampoa Ampasy Nampoina Ampasy Nahampoana
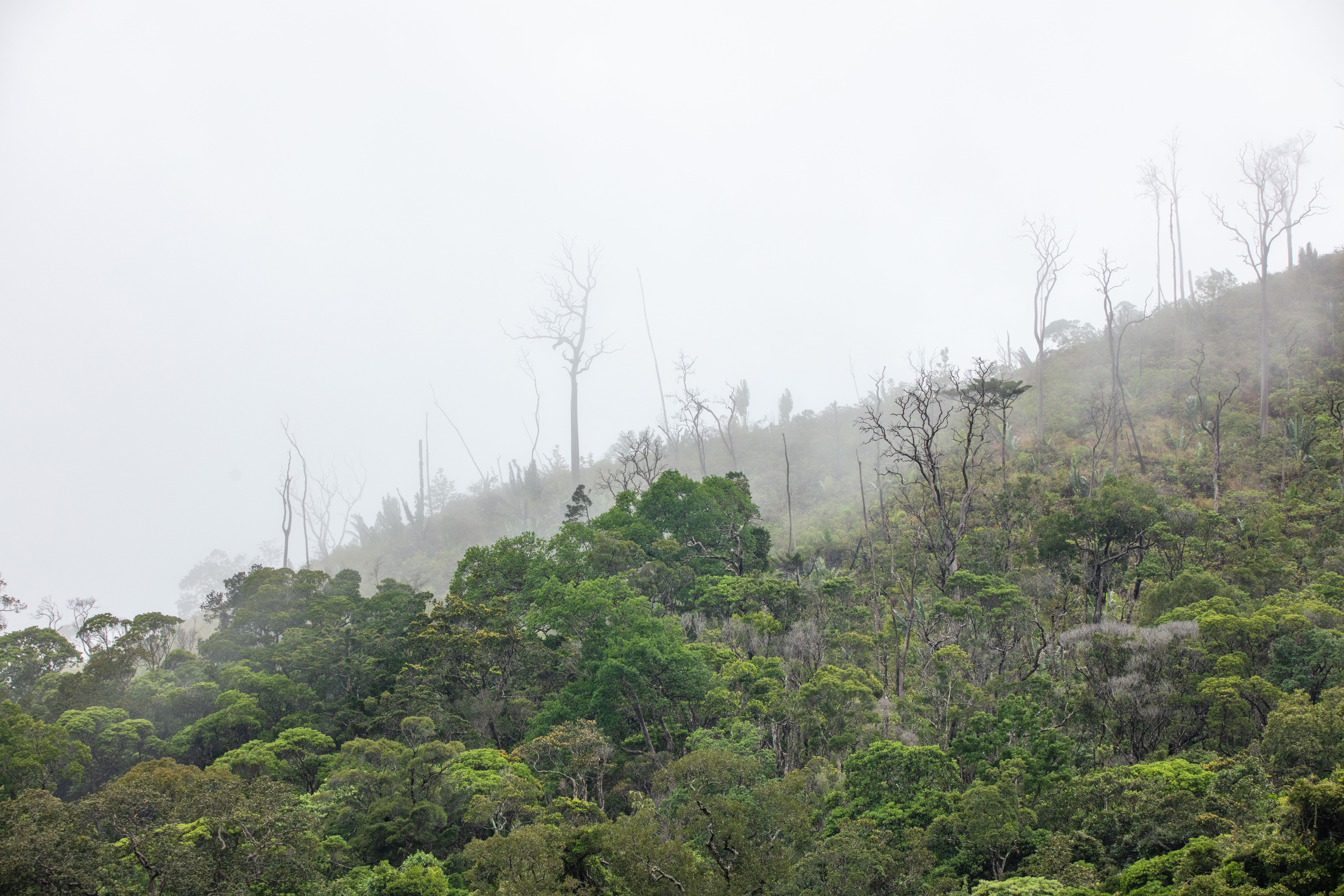
- the Tsitongambarika forest

- Location in Madagascar
- Coordinates: 24°58′S 46°59′E
- Country: Madagascar
- Region: Anosy
- District: Taolanaro

Government
  - Mayor: Andriamahasoro Rondromalala
- Elevation: 28 m (92 ft)

Population (2001)
  - Total: 6,000
- Time zone: UTC3 (EAT)
- Postal code: 614

Ampasy Nahampoa is a rural municipality in Madagascar. It belongs to the district of Taolanaro, which is a part of Anosy Region. The population of the commune was estimated to be approximately 6,000 in the 2001 commune census. It is situated at a distance of 7 km from Fort-Dauphin.

Only primary schooling is available. 75% of the population of the commune are farmers, while an additional 3% receive their livelihood from raising livestock. The most important crop is rice, while other important products are bananas and cassava. Industry and services provide employment for 15% and 5% of the population, respectively. Fishing employs 2% of the population.

== Roads ==
This municipality is situated at the National road 12a, 7 km from Fort-Dauphin.

== Nature ==
The Tsitongambarika forest is situated largely in this municipality.
