= Fenoevo =

- Location in Madagascar
- Coordinates: 24°41′S 46°53′E
- Country: Madagascar
- Region: Anosy
- District: Taolanaro

Area
  - Total: 279 km^{2} (108 sq mi)
- Elevation: 108 m (354 ft)

Population (2001)
  - Total: 5,000
- Time zone: UTC3 (EAT)
- Postal code: 614

Fenoevo is a rural municipality in Madagascar. It belongs to the district of Taolanaro, which is a part of Anosy Region. The population of the commune was estimated to be approximately 5,000 in 2001 commune census.

Only primary schooling is available. The majority 80% of the population of the commune are farmers, while an additional 10% receives their livelihood from raising livestock. The most important crop is rice, while other important products are coffee and cassava. Industry and services provide employment for 2% and 5% of the population, respectively. Additionally fishing employs 3% of the population.

== Roads ==
This municipality is crossed by the Provincial road RIP118 from Soanierana to Bevoay.
