= Ifarantsa =

- Location in Madagascar
- Coordinates: 24°56′S 46°51′E
- Country: Madagascar
- Region: Anosy
- District: Taolanaro

Area
  - Land: 234 km^{2} (90 sq mi)
- Elevation: 21 m (69 ft)

Population (2001)
  - Total: 10,000
- Time zone: UTC3 (EAT)
- Postal code: 614

Ifarantsa is a rural municipality Madagascar. It belongs to the district of Taolanaro, which is a part of Anosy Region. The population of the commune was estimated to be approximately 10,000 in 2001 commune census.

It is situated at 22 km from Fort Dauphin with which it is linked by the regional road 118.

Only primary schooling is available. The majority 70% of the population of the commune are farmers, while an additional 15% receives their livelihood from raising livestock. The most important crop is rice, while other important products are sugarcane and cassava. Industry and services provide employment for 4% and 10% of the population, respectively. Additionally fishing employs 1% of the population.

== Cash crops ==
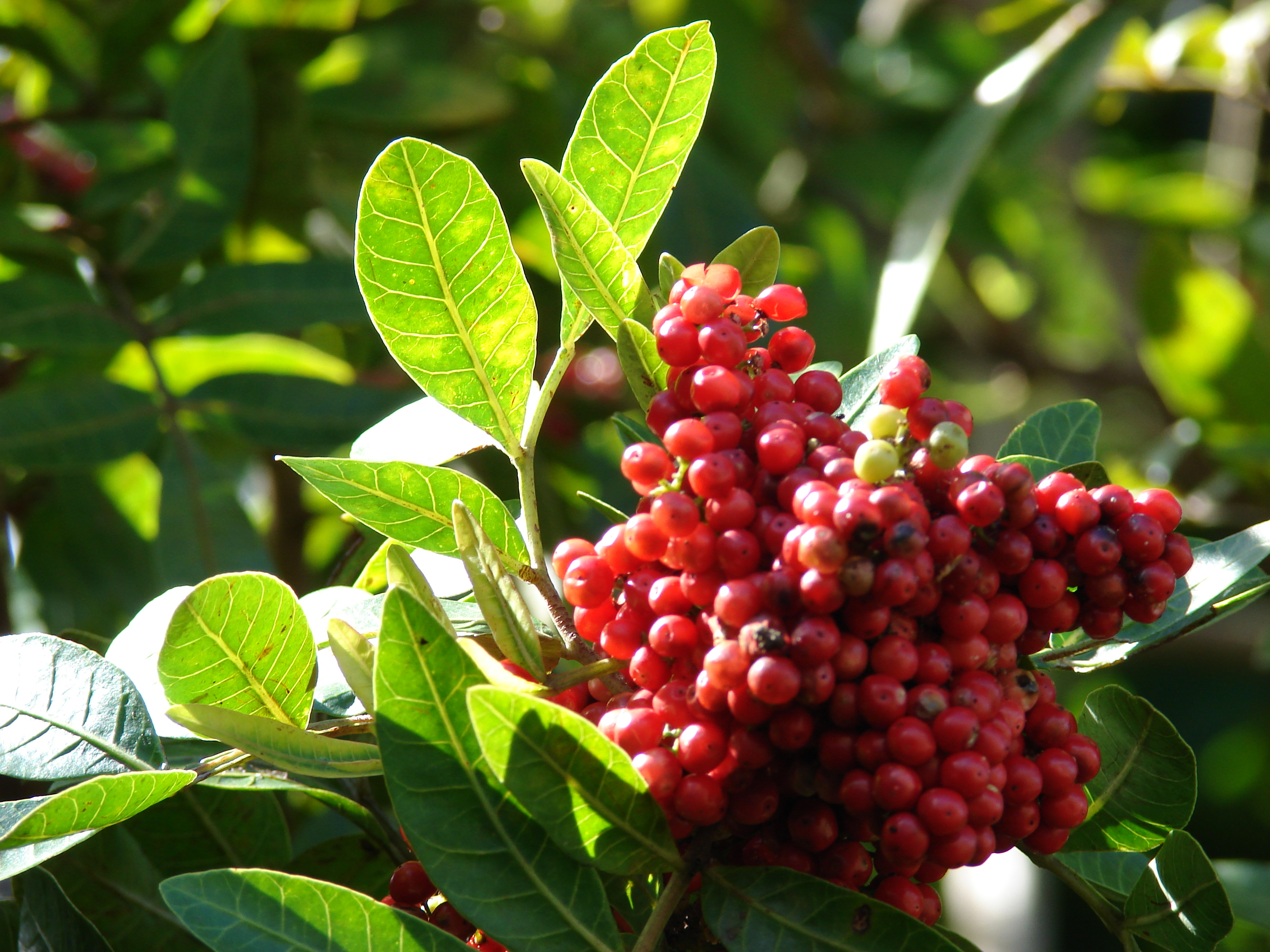
Peppercorn trees (Schinus terebinthifolius)

In Ifrantsa Peppercorn trees are harvested.

== Roads ==
This municipality is crossed by the Provincial road RIP118 from Soanierana to Bevoay.
