= Isaka-Ivondro =

Isaka - Ivondro
- Location in Madagascar
- Coordinates: 24°48′S 46°51′E
- Country: Madagascar
- Region: Anosy
- District: Taolanaro

Area
  - Total: 98 km^{2} (38 sq mi)
- Elevation: 172 m (564 ft)

Population (2001)
  - Total: 13,000
- Time zone: UTC3 (EAT)
- Postal code: 614

Isaka - Ivondro is a rural municipality in Madagascar. It belongs to the district of Taolanaro, which is a part of Anosy Region. The population of the commune was estimated to be approximately 13,000 in 2001 commune census.

Only primary schooling is available. The majority 75% of the population of the commune are farmers, while an additional 15% receives their livelihood from raising livestock. The most important crop is rice, while other important products are coffee, lychee and cassava. Services provide employment for 7% of the population. Additionally fishing employs 3% of the population.

== Roads ==
This municipality is crossed by the Provincial road RIP118 from Soanierana to Bevoay.
