= Iabakoho =

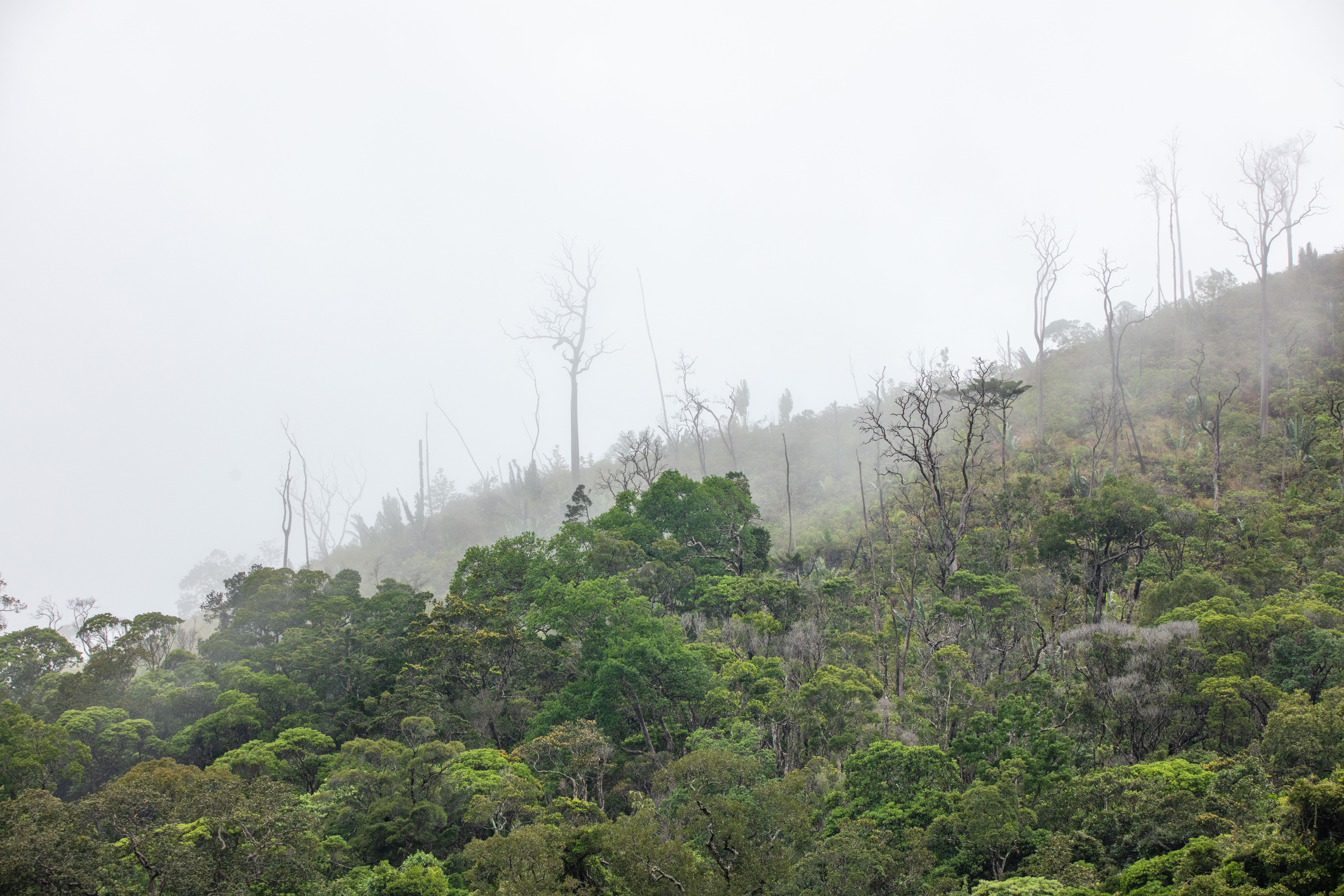
- the Tsitongambarika forest.

- Location in Madagascar
- Coordinates: 24°36′S 47°13′E
- Country: Madagascar
- Region: Anosy
- District: Taolanaro
- Elevation: 40 m (130 ft)

Population (2001)
  - Total: 3,000
- Time zone: UTC3 (EAT)
- Postal code: 614

Iabakoho is a town and commune in Madagascar. It belongs to the district of Taolanaro, which is a part of Anosy Region. The population of the commune was estimated to be approximately 3,000 in 2001 commune census.

Only primary schooling is available. The majority of the population of the commune are farmers (60%), while an additional 6% receives their livelihood from raising livestock. The most important crops are cassava and rice; also bananas are an important agricultural product. Industry and services provide employment for 2% of the population. Additionally, fishing employs 30% of the population.

== Roads ==
Iabakoho is situated at the National road 12a.

== Nature ==
The protected area of the Tsitongambarika forest.
