= Enakara-Haut =

Enakara - Haut
- Interactive map of Enakara - Haut
- Country: Madagascar
- Region: Anosy
- District: Taolanaro

Area
  - Total: 421 km^{2} (163 sq mi)

Population (2001)
  - Total: 7,000
- Time zone: UTC3 (EAT)
- Postal code: 614

Enakara - Haut is a rural municipality in Madagascar. It belongs to the district of Taolanaro, which is a part of Anosy Region. The population of the commune was estimated to be approximately 7,000 in 2001 commune census.

Only primary schooling is available. The majority 89% of the population of the commune are farmers, while an additional 8% receives their livelihood from raising livestock. The most important crop is rice, while other important products are coffee and cassava. Services provide employment for 3% of the population.

== Roads ==
This municipality is crossed by the Provincial road RIP118 from Soanierana to Bevoay.
