= Ranomafana, Taolanaro =

Ranomafana
- Location in Madagascar
- Coordinates: 24°34′S 46°58′E
- Country: Madagascar
- Region: Anosy
- District: Taolanaro

Area
  - Total: 383 km^{2} (148 sq mi)
- Elevation: 61 m (200 ft)

Population (2001)
  - Total: 11,000
- Time zone: UTC3 (EAT)
- Postal code: 614

Ranomafana is a rural municipality in Madagascar. It belongs to the district of Taolanaro, which is a part of Anosy Region. The population of the commune was estimated to be approximately 11,000 in 2001 commune census.

Primary and junior level secondary education are available in town. The majority 75% of the population of the commune are farmers, while an additional 20% receives their livelihood from raising livestock. The most important crops are coffee and rice, while other important agricultural products are lychee and cassava. Services provide employment for 3% of the population. Additionally fishing employs 2% of the population.

== Roads ==
This municipality is crossed by the Provincial road RIP118 from Soanierana to Bevoay.
