= Mahatalaky =

- Location in Madagascar
- Coordinates: 24°47′S 47°5′E
- Country: Madagascar
- Region: Anosy
- District: Taolanaro

Area
  - Total: 1,444 km^{2} (558 sq mi)
- Elevation: 33 m (108 ft)

Population (2001)
  - Total: 25,000
- Time zone: UTC3 (EAT)

Mahatalaky is a rural commune in Madagascar. It belongs to the district of Taolanaro, which is a part of Anosy Region. It is situated at 35 km from Fort Dauphin. The population of the commune was estimated to be approximately 25,000 in 2001 commune census. The Route nationale 12a (Madagascar) leads through the town.

Primary and junior level secondary education are available in town.

== Agriculture ==
Farming and raising livestock provides employment for 40% and 20% of the working population. 2009 were produced: Rice (3000 t), manioc (4000 t), banana (480 t), sugar cane (40 t) and coffee beans (50 t). Also fishing is an important factor. In 2009 on the territory of the municipality 40 t of lobster were fished.

The rate of analphabetism is high with 48.9 %.

To the municipality belong 16 fokontany (villages): Mahatalaky-Eroanga, Tsiharoa-Ambondro, Tsiharoa-Ampasy, Belavenoka-Andriambe, Farafara-Vatambe, Mahialambo, Manafiafy-Sainte Luce, Ebakika, Tsanoriha, Tsihalagna, Andramanaka, Mananara I, Mananara II, Volobe Atsimo, Beandry and Volobe Avaratra.

The village of Manafiafy and the Sainte Luce Reserve are situated in this municipality.
