= Ankaramena, Taolanaro =

Ankaramena
- Location in Madagascar
- Coordinates: 25°1′S 46°45′E
- Country: Madagascar
- Region: Anosy
- District: Taolanaro
- Elevation: 37 m (121 ft)

Population (2019)Census
  - Total: 14,456
- Time zone: UTC3 (EAT)
- Postal code: 614

Ankaramena is a rural municipality in Madagascar. It belongs to the district of Taolanaro, which is a part of Anosy Region. The population of the commune was estimated to be 14,456 in 2019. This municipality is located at approx. 30km west from Fort Dauphin in the Lavasoa-Ambatotsirongorongo Mountains.

Only primary schooling is available. The majority 67% of the population of the commune are farmers, while an additional 13% receives their livelihood from raising livestock. The most important crops are sweet potatoes and rice, while other important agricultural products are beans and cassava. Industry and services provide employment for 2% and 10% of the population, respectively. Additionally fishing employs 8% of the population.
