= Mandromodromotra =

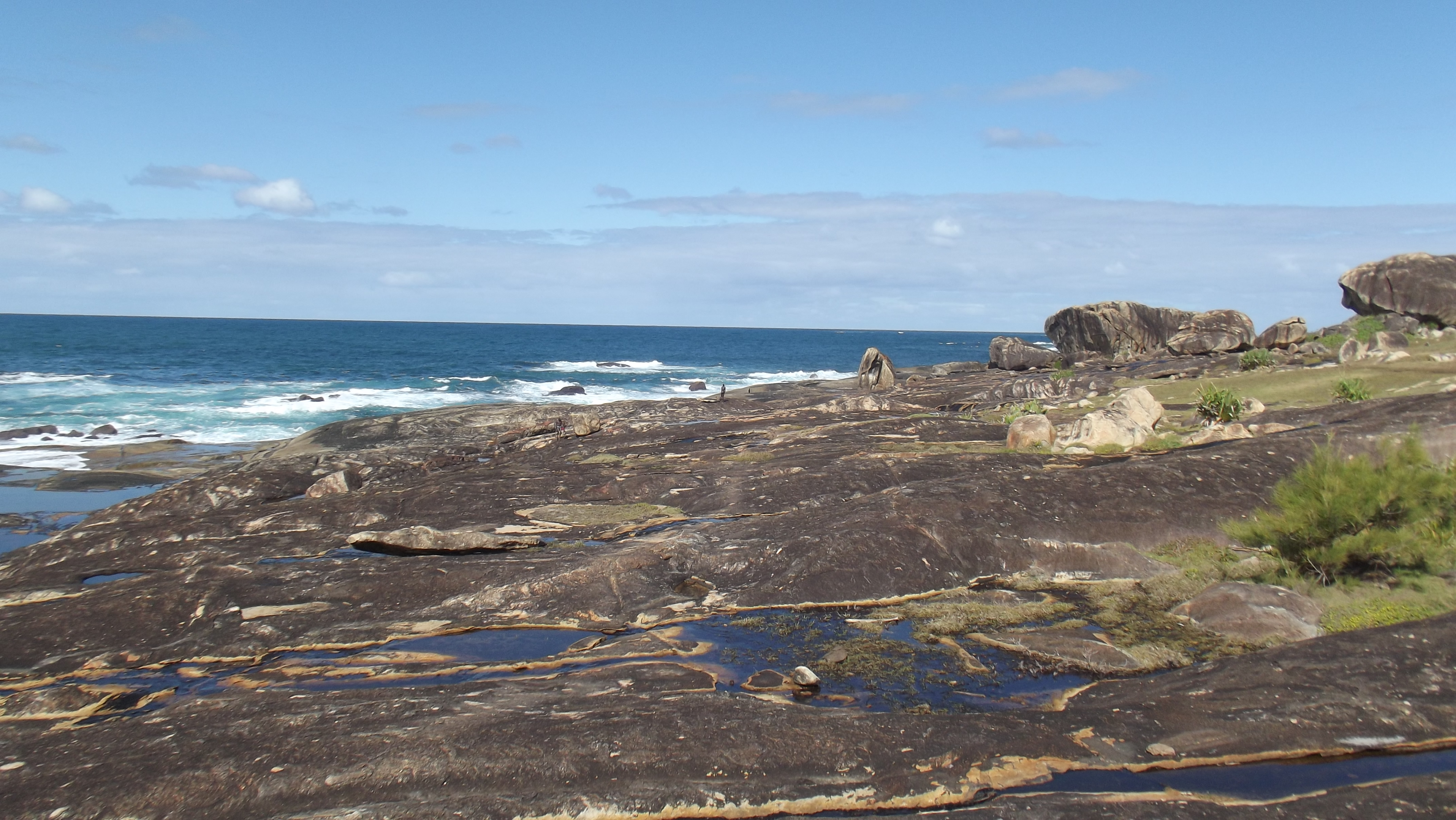
- Pointe Evatra in Mandromodromotra

- Location in Madagascar
- Coordinates: 24°55′S 47°2′E
- Country: Madagascar
- Region: Anosy
- District: Taolanaro
- Elevation: 13 m (43 ft)

Population (2001)
  - Total: 4,000
- Time zone: UTC3 (EAT)

Mandromodromotra is a rural municipality in Madagascar. It belongs to the district of Taolanaro, which is a part of Anosy Region. The population of the commune was estimated to be approximately 4,000 in 2001 commune census.

Only primary schooling is available. The majority 50% of the population of the commune are farmers, while an additional 10% receives their livelihood from raising livestock. The most important crop is rice, while other important products are lychee, cassava and sweet potatoes. Industry and services provide employment for 2% and 3% of the population, respectively. Additionally fishing employs 35% of the population.

== Roads ==
This municipality is crossed by the National road 12a, 17 km from Fort-Dauphin.
