= Sarasambo =

- Location in Madagascar
- Coordinates: 25°6′S 46°47′E
- Country: Madagascar
- Region: Anosy
- District: Taolanaro
- Elevation: 41 m (135 ft)

Population (2001)
  - Total: 9,000
- Time zone: UTC3 (EAT)
- Postal code: 614

Sarasambo is a municipality in Madagascar. It belongs to the district of Taolanaro, which is a part of Anosy Region. The population of the commune was estimated to be approximately 9,000 in 2001 commune census.

Only primary schooling is available. The majority 65% of the population of the commune are farmers, while an additional 5% receives their livelihood from raising livestock. The most important crop is rice, while other important products are peanuts and cassava. Services provide employment for 5% of the population. Additionally fishing employs 25% of the population.

This municipality is located at approx. 30km west from Fort Dauphin in the Lavasoa-Ambatotsirongorongo Mountains.
