= Ranopiso =

- Location in Madagascar
- Coordinates: 25°3′S 46°40′E
- Country: Madagascar
- Region: Anosy
- District: Taolanaro
- Elevation: 153 m (502 ft)

Population (2001)
  - Total: 9,000
- Time zone: UTC3 (EAT)
- Postal code: 614

Ranopiso is a municipality in Madagascar. It belongs to the district of Taolanaro, which is a part of Anosy Region.

It is situated at the Route nationale 13, Ihosy to Tolagnaro, in the Lavasoa-Ambatotsirongorongo Mountains range.

The population of the commune was estimated to be approximately 9,000 in 2001 commune census.

Primary and junior level secondary education are available in town. The majority 70% of the population of the commune are farmers, while an additional 20% receives their livelihood from raising livestock. The most important crop is rice, while other important products are beans, maize and cassava. Industry and services provide employment for 3% and 7% of the population, respectively.
