= Analapatsy =

- Location in Madagascar
- Coordinates: 24°15′S 47°12′E
- Country: Madagascar
- Region: Anosy
- District: Taolanaro
- Elevation: 40 m (130 ft)

Population (2001)
  - Total: 20,000
- Time zone: UTC3 (EAT)
- Postal code: 614

Analapatsy is a municipality in Madagascar. It belongs to the district of Taolanaro, which is a part of Anosy Region. The population of the commune was estimated to be approximately 20,000 in 2001 commune census.

It is situated in the Lavasoa-Ambatotsirongorongo Mountains range.

Only primary schooling is available. The majority 80% of the population works in fishing. 10% are farmers, while an additional 5% receives their livelihood from raising livestock. The most important crop is beans, while other important products are peanuts, maize and cassava. Services provide employment for 5% of the population.
