= Ampasimena =

- Location in Madagascar
- Coordinates: 24°22′S 47°10′E
- Country: Madagascar
- Region: Anosy
- District: Taolagnaro
- Elevation: 31 m (102 ft)

Population (2001)
  - Total: 20,000
- Time zone: UTC3 (EAT)

Ampasimena is a town and commune in Madagascar. It belongs to the district of Taolagnaro, which is a part of Anosy Region. The population of the commune was estimated to be approximately 20,000 in 2001 commune census.

Only primary schooling is available. The majority 95% of the population of the commune are farmers, while an additional 4% receives their livelihood from raising livestock. The most important crops are cassava and coffee; also rice is an important agricultural product. Services provide employment for 1% of the population.
