= Mandiso =

- Location in Madagascar
- Coordinates: 24°53′S 46°49′E
- Country: Madagascar
- Region: Anosy
- District: Taolanaro
- Elevation: 89 m (292 ft)

Population (2001)
  - Total: 6,000
- Time zone: UTC3 (EAT)

Mandiso is a town and commune in Madagascar. It belongs to the district of Taolanaro, which is a part of Anosy Region. The population of the commune was estimated to be approximately 6,000 in 2001 commune census.

Only primary schooling is available. The majority 98% of the population of the commune are farmers. The most important crop is rice, while other important products are cassava and sweet potatoes. Services provide employment for 2% of the population.
