= Ambatoabo =

- Location in Madagascar
- Coordinates: 24°51′S 46°41′E
- Country: Madagascar
- Region: Anosy
- District: Taolanaro
- Elevation: 230 m (750 ft)

Population (2001)
  - Total: 8,000
- Time zone: UTC3 (EAT)

Ambatoabo is a town and commune in Madagascar. It belongs to the district of Taolanaro, which is a part of Anosy Region. The population of the commune was estimated to be approximately 8,000 in 2001 commune census.

Only primary schooling is available. The majority 90% of the population of the commune are farmers, while an additional 7% receives their livelihood from raising livestock. The most important crop is rice, while other important products are beans, maize and cassava. Services provide employment for 3% of the population.
