= Ranomafana =

Ranomafana may refer to:

- Ranomafana Est - a village in Atsinanana, Madagascar
- Ranomafana, Ifanadiana, a town in Ifanadiana district, Madagascar
- Ranomafana, Taolanaro, a town in Taolanaro district, Madagascar
- Ranomafana National Park, Madagascar
- Ranomafana (beetle), a genus of beetles in the family Pyrochroidae
