= Manambaro =

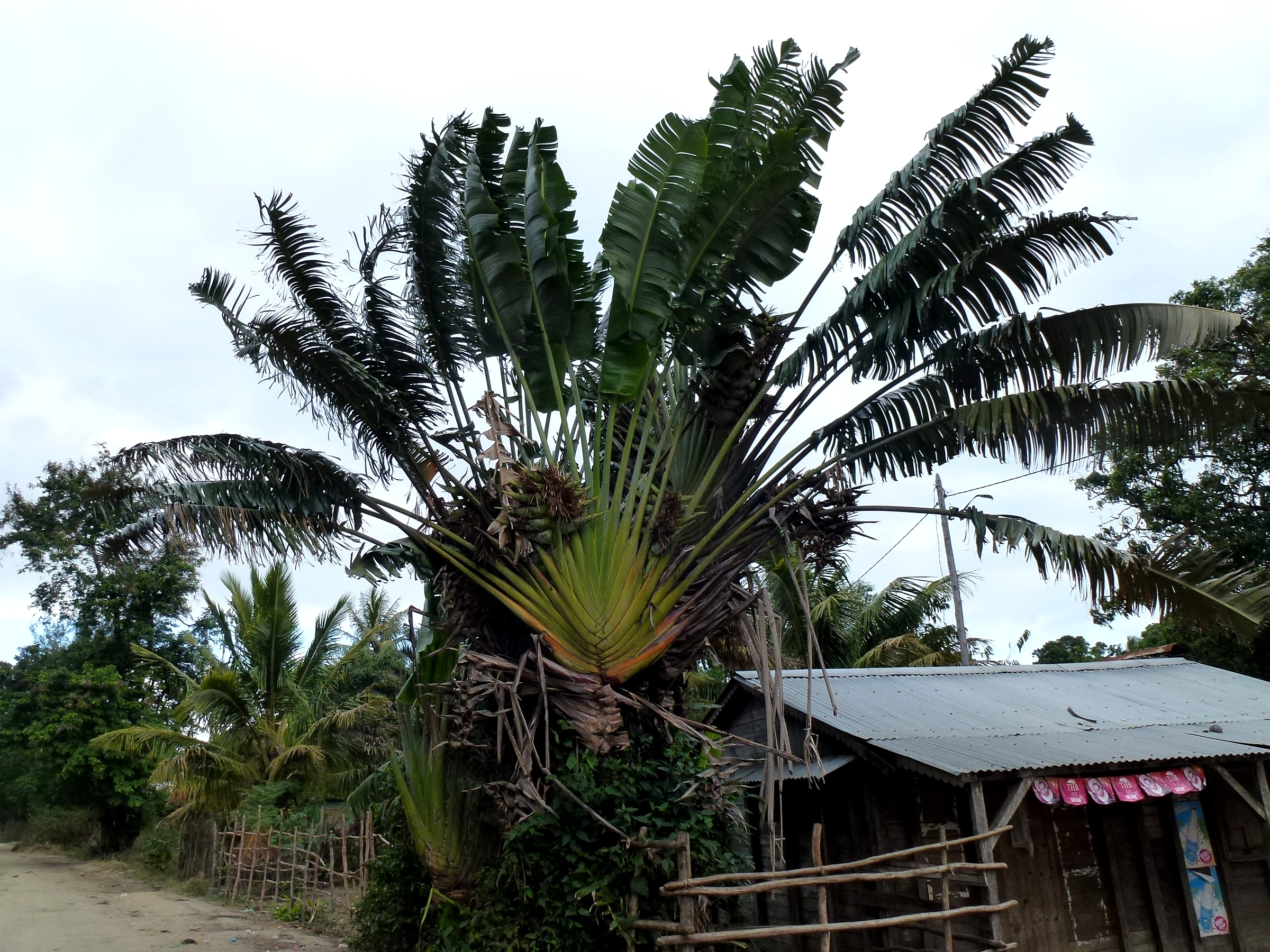
- Manambaro

- Location in Madagascar
- Coordinates: 25°2′S 46°49′E
- Country: Madagascar
- Region: Anosy
- District: Taolanaro
- Elevation: 19 m (62 ft)

Population (2019)Census
  - Total: 17,901
- Time zone: UTC3 (EAT)
- Postal code: 614

Manambaro is a rural municipality in Madagascar. It belongs to the district of Taolanaro, which is a part of Anosy Region.

It is situated at 21 kilometers on the Route nationale 13, Ihosy to Tolagnaro. Though, the bridge over the Akofa river has collapsed in 2021.

The word "Manambaro" means "has a lot of varo". "Varo" is a large and tall tree which was peculiar of the Anosy region and has been almost disappeared now due to charcoal makers. Very few are noted in Analapatsy.

In addition to primary schooling, the town offers secondary education at both junior and senior levels. The town provides access to hospital services (Manambaro Lutheran Hospital and a first level government clinic or CSB1) to its citizens. Fifty percent of the commune's population are farmers. The most important crop is rice; other important products include cassava and lychee. An additional 15% of Manambaro's population receives their livelihood from raising livestock and another 20% from fishing. Industry and services provide employment for 5% and 10% of the population, respectively.

A new slaughter house for cows is under construction 5 km from the village centre. It is called BOVIMA or "Bonne Viande Malgache".
