= Analamary, Taolanaro =

Analamary
- Location in Madagascar
- Coordinates: 24°14′S 47°13′E
- Country: Madagascar
- Region: Anosy
- District: Taolanaro
- Elevation: 33 m (108 ft)

Population (2001)
  - Total: 15,000
- Time zone: UTC3 (EAT)

Analamary is a town and commune in Madagascar. It belongs to the district of Taolanaro, which is a part of Anosy Region. The population of the commune was estimated to be approximately 15,000 in 2001 commune census.

Only primary schooling is available. Farming and raising livestock provides employment for 40% and 35% of the working population. The most important crops are cassava and coffee, while other important agricultural products are sweet potatoes and rice. Services provide employment for 2% of the population. Additionally fishing employs 23% of the population.
