= Masianaka =

Masianaka Masihanaka
- Location in Madagascar
- Coordinates: 23°35′S 47°35′E
- Country: Madagascar
- Region: Atsimo-Atsinanana
- District: Vangaindrano
- Elevation: 3 m (9.8 ft)

Population (2001)
  - Total: 18,000
- Time zone: UTC3 (EAT)
- Postal code: 320

Masianaka is a rural municipality in the island of Madagascar. It belongs to district in the Vangaindrano, which is part of the Atsimo-Atsinanana Region. The population of the commune was estimated to be 18,000 in 2001 commune census.

Only primary schooling is available. The majority of the population of the commune are farmers.The most important crops are rice and cloves, while other important agricultural products are coffee, cassava, sweet potatoes and pepper. Services provide employment for 1% of the population. Making up to 66% of the population are farmers. Additionally, fishing employs 33% of the population.

== Roads ==
Masianaka is situated on the East coast of Madagascar on the National road 12A, 30 km south from Vangaindrano. The first ferry on the National road 12A in direction of Fort Dauphin is in this municipality.

== Lake Masihanaka ==
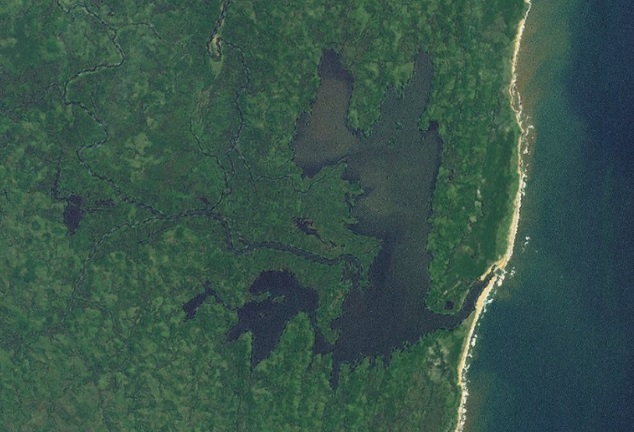
Lake Masihanaka

Next to the town the Masianaka river forms the Lake Masihanaka (Farihy Masihanaka).
