= Route nationale 13 (Madagascar) =

Road in Madagascar

Location
- Country: Madagascar

Highway system
- Roads in Madagascar

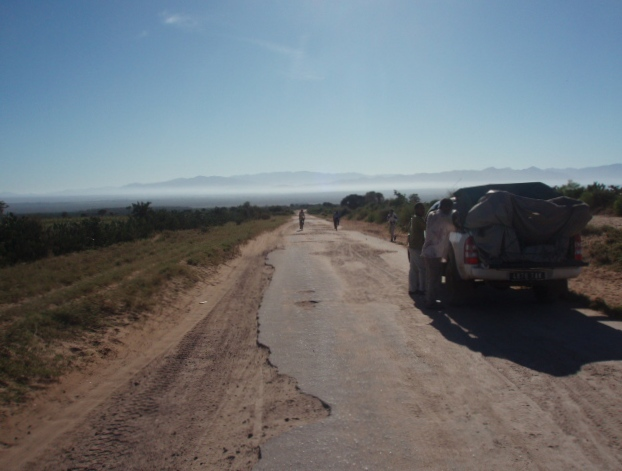
Route nationale 13 near Berenty

Route nationale 13 (RN 13) is a primary highway in Madagascar of 493 km, running from Ihosy to Tolagnaro (Fort-Dauphin). It crosses the regions of Ihorombe, Androy and Anosy.

It is completely unpaved between Ihosy and Ambovombe, and had been in very bad shape between Ambovombe and Tolagnaro.

It was planned to pave the section between Ihosy and Ambovombe from 2009 on with funding from the European Union but this project was stopped due to the political take over of Andry Rajoelina and the 2009 Malagasy political crisis.

The repavement of 108 km of this road between Ambovombe and Fort-Dauphin was only finished in June 2026. The remaining 400 kms remain unpaved.

== Selected locations on the route ==
(north to south)

- Ihosy - intersection with Route nationale 7
- Betroka
  - (crossing Mangoky River)
  - Kalambatritra Reserve at 55 km east
- Ianabinda
- Beraketa
- Antanimora Atsimo
- Ambovombe - intersection with Route nationale 10
- Amboasary Sud
  - Mandrare River crossing
  - Berenty Reserve
  - Lake Anony
  - Italy Bay
- Ranopiso
- Manambaro
- Tolagnaro (Fort-Dauphin) - continues North as Route nationale 12a

== See also ==
- List of roads in Madagascar
- Transport in Madagascar
