= Tranomaro =

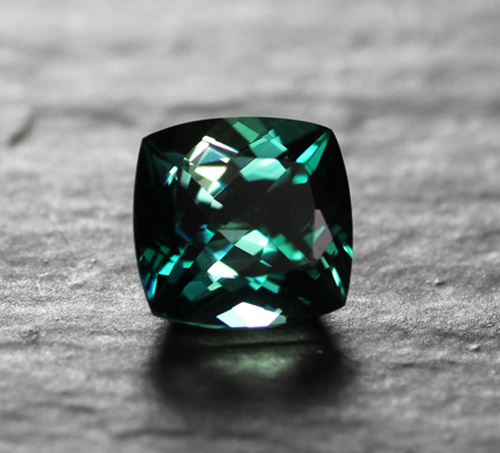
- a Grandidierite from Tranomaro

- Location in Madagascar
- Coordinates: 24°36′S 46°28′E
- Country: Madagascar
- Region: Anosy
- District: Amboasary Sud
- Elevation: 308 m (1,010 ft)

Population (2001)
  - Total: 11,000
- Time zone: UTC3 (EAT)
- Postal code: 603

Tranomaro is a rural municipality in Madagascar. It belongs to the district of Amboasary Sud, which is a part of Anosy Region. The population of the commune was estimated to be approximately 11,000 in 2001.

Only primary schooling is available. The majority 80% of the population of the commune are farmers, while an additional 15% receives their livelihood from raising livestock. The most important crops are cassava and rice; also maize is an important agricultural product. Industry and services provide employment for 2% and 3% of the population, respectively.

== Mica Mining ==
Grandidierite and Mica is mined in Tranomaro. There are several artisanal mines.
