= Lavasoa-Ambatotsirongorongo Mountains =

Mountain chain in Madagascar

Coordinates: 25.100°S 46.770°E

Lavasoa-Ambatotsirongorongo Mountains are a mountain chain in southern Madagascar. They are situated in the municipalities of Sarasambo, Ankaramena, Ranopiso and Analapatsy, 30 kilometres (19 mi) west of Fort Dauphin. They are composed of three peaks:

1. Grand Lavasoa (823 m (2,700 ft))
2. Petit Lavasoa (617 m (2,024 ft))
3. Ambatotsirongorongo (438 m (1,437 ft))

== Nature ==
Ambatotsirongorongo protected area contains a vast array of species. The area is unique in the fact that wet and dry ecosystem species occur in sympatry. The area contains lemurs, frogs, chameleons, skinks and geckos.

== Lemurs ==
The area, as of 2025 contains at least eight species of lemurs, historically it contained ten lemur species

=== Dwarf & Mouse Lemurs ===
The area contains species of both Cheirogaleus and Microcebus genera.

The area as of 2025 contains Microcebus manitatra and Microcebus tanosi. Historically the area contained Microcebus murinus, Cheirogaleus medius and Cheirogaleus crossleyi.

The Lavasoa dwarf lemur (Cheirogaleus lavasoensis), a small, nocturnal strepsirrhine primate and a species of lemur was discovered in the 21st century. The primate, endemic to three small, isolated patches of forest on the southern slopes of the Lavasoa Mountains, was named after the mountain itself.

=== Bamboo Lemurs ===
The area as of 05/2026 is known to contain Hapalemur meridionalis

=== Indri Lemurs ===
The area as of 2025 is known to contain Avahi meridionalis and historically was home to Propithecus verreauxi but this species has not been seen here since 2021. Despite no visual contacts of Propithecus verreauxi, calls observed recently in the area by undergraduate students have an extreme degree of likeness to Propithecus verreauxi, suggesting the species may still be present in the area.

=== Ringtailed Lemurs ===
The area is known to contain Lemur catta as of 2025 and has historically contained this species

=== Eulemur Lemurs ===
The area sustains a small population of Eulemur collaris as of 2025. This population is only present in the Lavasoa fragment of the protected area.

== Reptiles ==
Furcifer Lateralis is present in the area

== Snakes ==
Malagasy Boas, Cat eye snakes and other snakes are present
