= Ambovombe-Androy =

Ambovombe-Androy Ambovombe
- Location in Madagascar
- Coordinates: 25°10′35″S 46°05′00″E
- Country: Madagascar
- Region: Androy
- District: Ambovombe-Androy

Population (2018)
  - Total: 114,230
- Time zone: UTC3 (EAT)
- postal code: 604

Ambovombe-Androy ([ambuˈvumbe ˈaɳɖʐuj]), or just Ambovombe, is a city in the far south of Madagascar, and the capital of the Androy region. Ambovombe has now acquired city status with an officially estimated population of 114,230 in 2018.

The city is connected by the Route nationale 13 with Taolagnaro (113 km) to the east. This part of the road had been renovated in 2026 and can be done in 3h. The RN 13 also leads north to Ihosy (434 km), and the Route nationale 10 north-west to Toliara (512 km up to Andranovory and the RN 7), but these roads are in bad condition.

== Agriculture ==
There are commercial sisal plantations near this town.

Catharanthus roseus is endemic to this region of southern Madagascar and is produced on farms around Ambovombe-Androy and Fort Dauphin. The plant is exported from this area and then used as a natural source of the alkaloids used to make vincristine, vinblastine and other vinca alkaloid cancer drugs.
