= Tsitongambarika =

Protected area in Anosy, Madagascar

- Réserve de Ressources Naturelles de la Forêt Naturelle de Tsitongambarika
- IUCN category VI (protected area with sustainable use of natural resources)
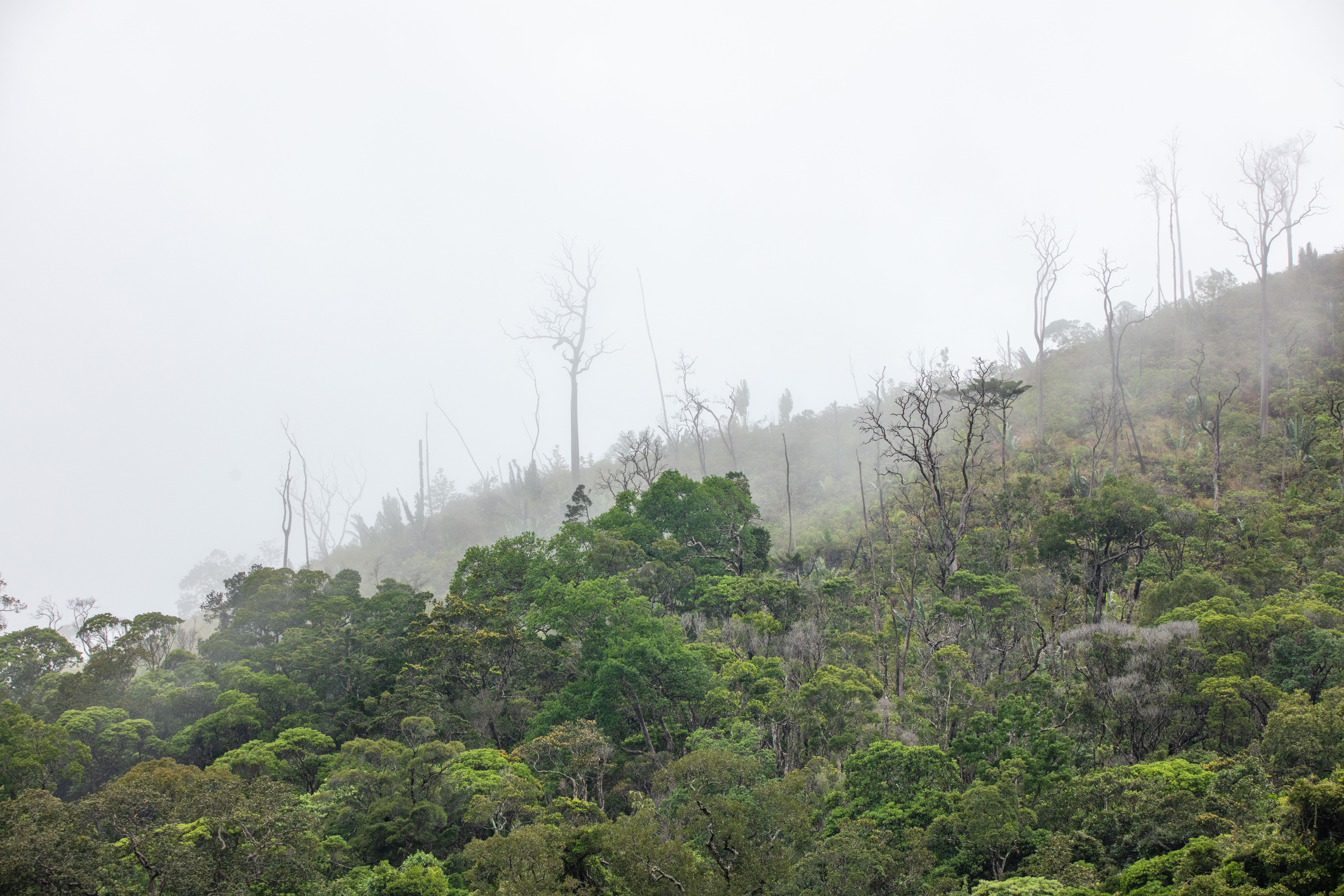
- Forests in Tsitongambarika

- Location within Madagascar
- Location: Madagascar
- Nearest city: Fort-Dauphin
- Coordinates: 24°42′S 47°00′E
- Area: 58,597 ha (226 sq mi)
- Designation: Natural Resources Reserve
- Designated: 2015
- Governing body: Asity Madagascar

Tsitongambarika is a 58,597 ha protected area of lowland forest in the Anosy region of southeast of Madagascar, to the north of Fort-Dauphin. The area supports rare species of amphibians, birds, lemurs and reptiles, many of which are endemic. In 2001, the site was designated as an Important Bird Area by BirdLife International, and in 2015 an area of 58,957 ha received protection by the government under Decree No. 2015-720 of 21 April 2015.

== Geography ==
The forest is in the south of the island of Madagascar, within the Tsitongambarika massif, which consists of a series of ridges aligned from south-west to north-east. On the western boundary the Manampanihy river flows northwards. The nearest town is Fort-Dauphin, 9 km to the south. Tsitongambarika is the only area in the south of the country that still has significant areas of lowland forest but, due to illegal logging and shifting cultivation, deforestation rates are amongst the highest in the country. The forest forms the water catchment of rivers and streams that are of importance for the cultivation of rice on the coastal plain.

== Management and protection ==
Legal classifications and protections have evolved over time. The areas classified as Forêts Classées de Tsitongambarika I (Order No. 3240-MAER/FOR of 6 June 1965, 19,530 ha) and Tsitongambarika II (Order No. 2241-MAER/SEGREF/FOR/DOM of 4 June 1970, 29,400 ha) were integrated into the Réserve de Ressources Naturelles created in 2015 based on Decree No. 2015-720 of 21 April 2015.

The area was assessed by BirdLife International to be an Important Bird Area in 2001, and since 2005 Asity Madagascar have been working with local communities to manage the area. Despite legal protection Birdlife International considers the forest to be an 'IBA in Danger'.

== Values ==
=== Biodiversity ===
The lowland humid evergreen forest ecosystem making up much of Tsitongambarika is one of the most threatened vegetation types in Madagascar, and the forests of Tsitongambarika are found to be floristically and faunistically distinct from lowland humid evergreen forests elsewhere in Madagascar. Tsitongambarika forests are mainly distributed below 800 m altitude and, almost uniquely for humid forests in south-eastern Madagascar, include significant areas below 400 m.

Botanical collecting in the 2000s found at least seventy new species. The reserve supports areas of intact low- and mid-elevation, dense, humid evergreen forest, and sclerophyllous montane forest. At low elevations the canopy is at 15 m to 25 m and dominated by Dracaena, Ilex, Oncostemum, Sorindeia, Syzygium and Tambourissa. At mid-elevations the canopy is 12 m to 20 m high with trees of Macaranga and Oncostemon, as well as species of Guttiferae, Monimiaceae, Moraceae, and Myrtaceae.

The forest on Mount Ivohibe (677 m) (more than one on the island with the same name) is an isolated peak with a relatively undisturbed forest. An expedition, organised by the Royal Botanic Gardens, Kew in 2010 recorded twenty species of palms making it one of the richest sites for palms in the southern part of the island. Sixteen species are either rare or threatened species according to the IUCN Red List. Expedition members considered the forest on Ivohibe to be a 'site of major palm significance'.

The area supports a large number of endemic, rare, and threatened species, and many of the amphibians and reptiles found at the site are likely to be new to science. The mountains of Anosy Region are one of the two areas in Madagascar with the highest number of globally threatened amphibian species, and the Anosy Region is also one of the richest in Madagascar for reptile species, with a number of species not known from elsewhere in the country.

The brown mesite (Mesitornis unicolor) is a ground-dwelling bird of undisturbed primary, evergreen, humid forest and its population is thought to be declining rapidly. It is listed as vulnerable due its habitat along the eastern seaboard of Madagascar being fragmented. Other key species include Madagascar blue-pigeon (Alectroenas madagascariensis), Madagascar wood-rail (Mentocrex kioloides), nelicourvi weaver (Ploceus nelicourvi), nuthatch vanga (Hypositta corallirostris), red-fronted coua (Coua reynaudii), scaly ground-roller (Geobiastes squamiger), spectacled tetraka (Bernieria zosterop) and white-throated oxylabes (Oxylabes madagascariensis).

=== Ecosystem services ===
In addition to being an important site for forest and biodiversity conservation, Tsitongambarika serves as the principal watershed for the region, providing water for irrigation and for Fort-Dauphin town, protecting the catchments of two of the Anosy region's major rivers: the Manampanihy and Efaho. The forest provides numerous other ecosystem goods and services that ensure the economic and cultural well-being of the surrounding population, including firewood, charcoal, construction materials, bushmeat and medicinal plants. Since the local economy is largely subsistence-based and there is a high incidence of poverty, local communities have a high level of dependence on forest products to meet their daily needs.

== Threats ==
Forest clearance for shifting cultivation (tavy) has significant impacts on the Tsitongambarika forests. Further forest clearance and degradation comes from poorly controlled fires, often set to clear cattle pasture, and timber harvesting. Although not at high levels, hunting and collecting of non-timber forest products are both starting to locally deplete some natural resources.

== See also ==
- Rainforests of the Atsinanana
