= Bevoay =

- Location in Madagascar
- Coordinates: 24°29′S 47°1′E
- Country: Madagascar
- Region: Anosy
- District: Taolanaro
- Elevation: 92 m (302 ft)

Population (2001)
  - Total: 15,000
- Time zone: UTC3 (EAT)
- Postal code: 614

Bevoay is a town and commune in Madagascar. It belongs to the district of Taolanaro, which is a part of Anosy Region. The population of the commune was estimated to be approximately 15,000 in 2001 commune census.

Only primary schooling is available. The majority 68.5% of the population of the commune are farmers, while an additional 30% receives their livelihood from raising livestock. The most important crop is rice, while other important products are coffee, lychee and cassava. Services provide employment for 0.5% of the population. Additionally fishing employs 1% of the population.

== Roads ==
The municipality is connected by the Provincial road RIP118 from Soanierana.
