= Route nationale 12a (Madagascar) =

Road in Madagascar

Location
- Country: Madagascar

Highway system
- Roads in Madagascar

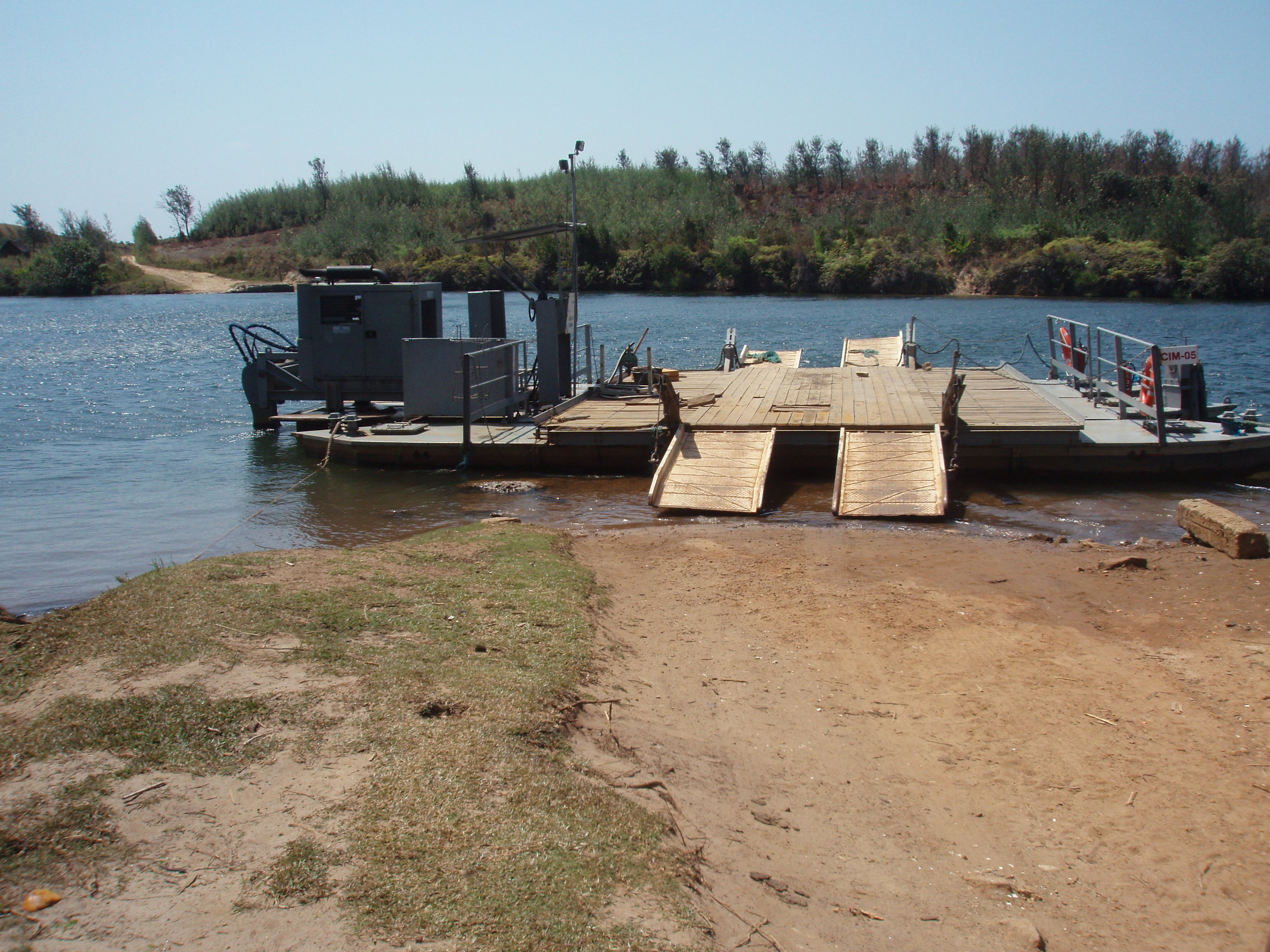
RN 12a, ferry over the Esama river

Route nationale 12a (RN 12a) is a primary highway in Madagascar of 232 km, running from Vangaindrano to Tôlanaro (Fort Dauphin). It crosses the regions of Anosy and Atsimo-Atsinanana. 10 ferries have to be taken along this road.

== Renovation ==
The part between Tolagnaro (Fort Dauphin) and Ebakika Atsimo (45km) had been refurnished and the road is entirely paved.

== Selected locations on route ==
(north to south)

- Vangaindrano
- Masianaka - 30 km - ferry
- Befasy, Anosy
- Manambondro - 9th ferry over Mamandro river (186 km from Fort-Dauphin)
- Manantenina - ferry over Soavary river; (107 km from Fort-Dauphin)
- Esama - (ferry over Esama river)
- Manambato, Ansoy
- Ebakika Atsimo (45 km before Fort-Dauphin)
- Mahatalaky (and the Sainte Luce Reserve - 35 km from Fort Dauhpin)
- Mandromodromotra (17 km before Fort Dauphin)
- Tôlanaro (Fort Dauphin)

== Ferries ==
10 rivers are crossed by this national road by ferry:

- Ferry No. River km
- Ferry n°1 Ebakika - PK 45
- Ferry n°2 Vatomirindry -PK 54
- Ferry n°3 Iaboakoho - PK 60
- Ferry n°4 Manambato - PK 75
- Ferry n°5 Esama - PK 95
- Ferry n°6 Manampanihy - PK 108
- Ferry n°7 Maroroy - PK 124
- Ferry n°8 Manara - PK 150
- Ferry n°9 Manambondro - PK 189
- Ferry n°10 Lower Masianaka - PK 216

== See also ==
- List of roads in Madagascar
- Transport in Madagascar
