= Soanierana, Taolanaro =

Soanierana
- Location in Madagascar
- Coordinates: 25°0′S 46°53′E
- Country: Madagascar
- Region: Anosy
- District: Taolanaro

Area
  - Total: 606 km^{2} (234 sq mi)
- Elevation: 35 m (115 ft)

Population (2001)
  - Total: 9,000
- Time zone: UTC3 (EAT)
- Postal code: 614

Soanierana is a rural municipality in Madagascar. It belongs to the district of Taolanaro, which is a part of Anosy Region. The population of the commune was estimated to be approximately 9,000 in 2001 commune census.

Only primary schooling is available. The majority 64% of the population of the commune are farmers, while an additional 5% receives their livelihood from raising livestock. The most important crop is rice, while other important products are cassava and sweet potatoes. Industry and services provide employment for 2% and 10% of the population, respectively. Additionally, fishing employs 19% of the population.

== Roads ==
This municipality is crossed by the Provincial road RIP118.
