= Fort-Dauphin (Madagascar) =

Fort-Dauphin Taolagnaro
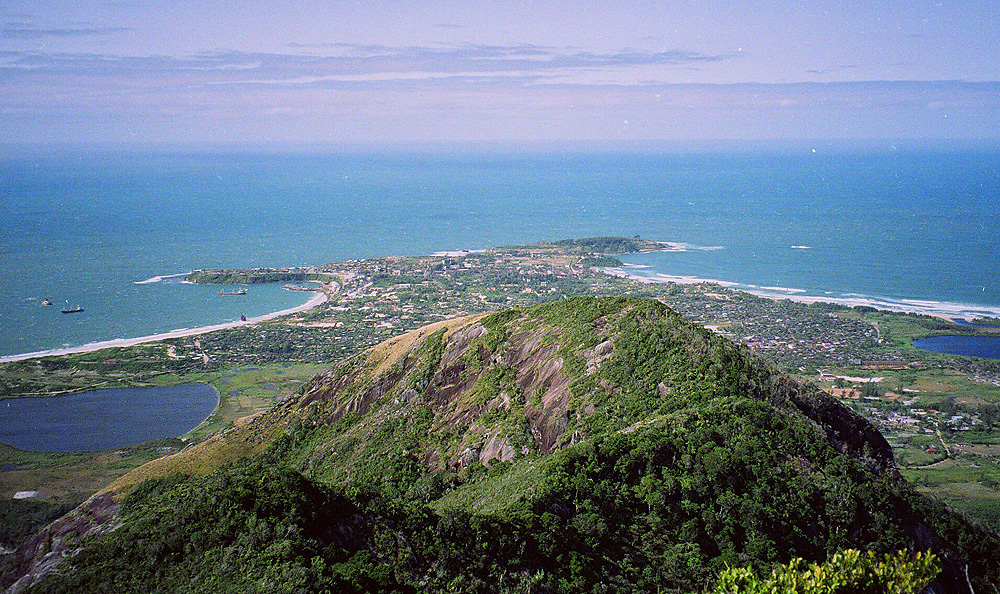

- Location of Fort-Dauphin in Madagascar
- Coordinates: 25°01′57″S 46°59′00″E
- Country: Madagascar
- Region: Anosy

Government
  - Mayor: Georges Mamy RANDRIANAINA

Area
  - Total: 31.17 km^{2} (12.03 sq mi)
- Elevation: 27 m (89 ft)

Population (2018 census)
  - Total: 67,284
  - Density: 2,159/km^{2} (5,591/sq mi)
- Time zone: East Africa Time (GMT+3)
- Postal code: 614
- Climate: Af

Fort-Dauphin (Malagasy Tolagnaro or Taolagnaro) is a city (commune urbaine) on the southeast coast of Madagascar. It is the capital of the Anosy Region and of the Taolagnaro District. It has been a port of local importance since the early 1500s. A new port, the Ehoala Port was built in 2006–2009. Fort-Dauphin was the first French settlement in Madagascar.

== History ==
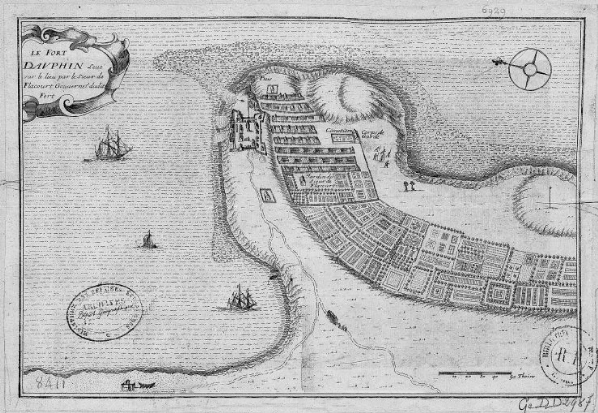
Plan of the fort from 1650

The bay of Fort-Dauphin was found by a Portuguese Captain in 1500. Fort Dauphin was founded on an Antanosy village, Taolankarana, in 1643 by the French East India Company who built a fort there named in honor of the Dauphin (crown prince) of France, the future Louis XIV. It was settled by around a hundred colonists, who found themselves involved in the local politics. The poor trade results (some ebony and little more was obtained) hardly justified the difficulties of the settlers, who suffered from tropical illnesses and other problems. After a conflict with the Antanosy people, the survivors were evacuated in 1674.

One Governor of this colony, Étienne de Flacourt, published the History of the Great Isle of Madagascar and Relations, which was the main source of information on the island for Europeans until the late 19th century.

After World War II and until Didier Ratsiraka took the presidency in 1975, Fort Dauphin had a thriving community of Malagasy, French, Chinese and Pakistani merchants with adequate roads connecting the city to Toliara to the west and Fianarantsoa to the west and then north. The port provided a means of exporting cattle to Mauritius and importing various goods from France and elsewhere. During the time Philibert Tsiranana was President of Madagascar, he enjoyed flying down to Fort Dauphin.

In 1975, the French businesses were nationalized, French citizens' assets were frozen, and several were briefly imprisoned.

=== Modern era ===
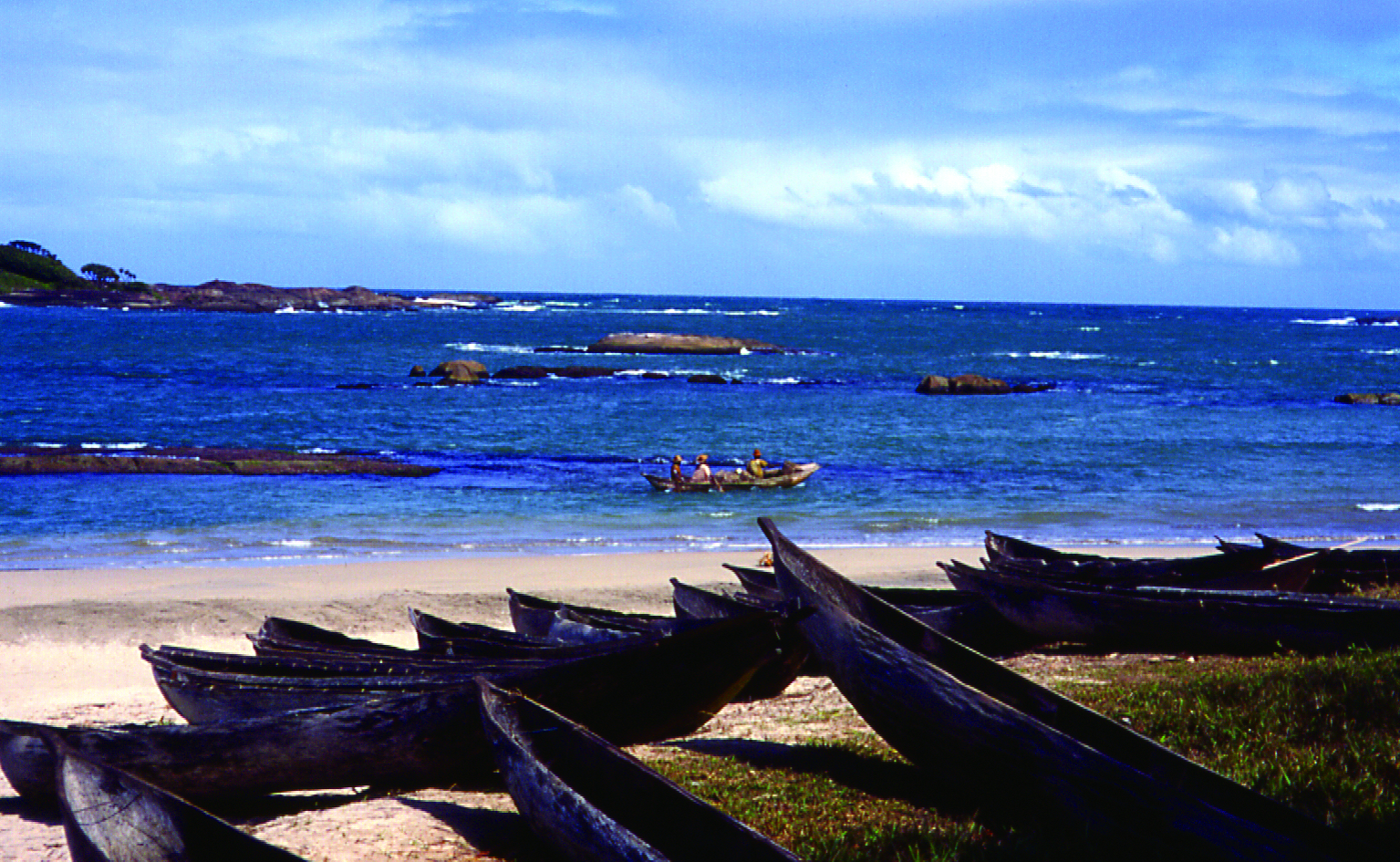
Fishing is a traditional part of the coastal lifestyle.

Since the early 1970s, Fort Dauphin suffered an economic decline due to lack of good road connections to the rest of the country, rendering its port of local importance only. This in spite of significant foreign exchange earned from the export of live lobster (250 to over 350 tonnes per year from 1990 to 2005), and sapphires.

The Mandena ilmenite mine near Fort-Dauphin was opened by QIT Madagascar Minerals in 1986 prompting a boost in employment, migration to the area, development of roads and exacerbation of deforestation. Associated with the mine the port d'Ehoala was built, 10 km west of Tolagnaro. These are the first major investments in the region's infrastructure for many decades. The mine contaminated Lake Besaroy in 2014-2015 and has been met with mixed reactions from local communities, who held protests in 2013 and 2022.

Today, there are a large variety of international non-governmental organizations with offices in Tolagnaro.

== Geography ==
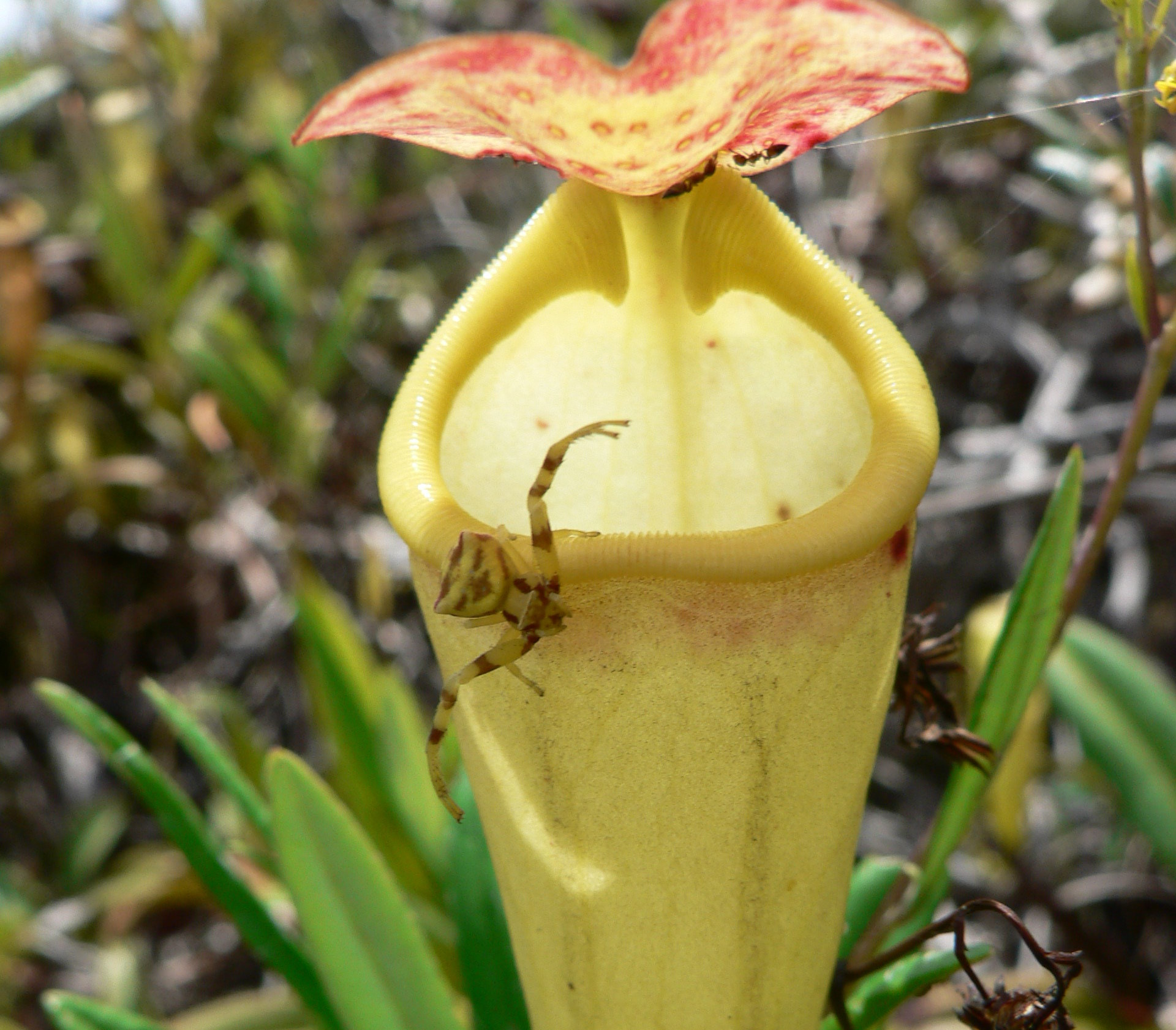
Nepenthes madagascariensis - a pitcher plant at Lokaro

Fort-Dauphin was initially situated on a short, narrow peninsula on the extreme southeastern coast of Madagascar, but has since grown to cover a much greater area along the ocean, almost to Mount Bezavona.

- Andohahela National Park is within driving distance, 40 kilometres (25 mi) to the northwest of Fort-Dauphin.
- Berenty Reserve
- Tsitongambarika reserve

=== Climate ===
Fort-Dauphin has a tropical rainforest climate, though it is less rainy than areas further north on the eastern Malagasy coast. Being closer to the centre of the subtropical anticyclones than other parts of Madagascar, most rainfall is orographic, and tropical cyclones are not as common as in more northerly parts of the island.

Climate data for Tôlanaro (1991–2020, extremes 1890–present)
Month	Jan	Feb	Mar	Apr	May	Jun	Jul	Aug	Sep	Oct	Nov	Dec	Year
Record high °C (°F)	36.4 (97.5)	36.5 (97.7)	38.0 (100.4)	33.6 (92.5)	33.2 (91.8)	32.1 (89.8)	34.0 (93.2)	36.1 (97.0)	35.8 (96.4)	33.7 (92.7)	36.3 (97.3)	37.5 (99.5)	38.0 (100.4)
Mean daily maximum °C (°F)	30.5 (86.9)	30.3 (86.5)	29.8 (85.6)	28.4 (83.1)	26.7 (80.1)	25.2 (77.4)	24.5 (76.1)	25.3 (77.5)	26.5 (79.7)	27.6 (81.7)	28.7 (83.7)	30.2 (86.4)	27.8 (82.0)
Daily mean °C (°F)	27.1 (80.8)	27.0 (80.6)	26.5 (79.7)	25.0 (77.0)	23.0 (73.4)	21.4 (70.5)	20.7 (69.3)	21.3 (70.3)	22.5 (72.5)	23.8 (74.8)	25.1 (77.2)	26.6 (79.9)	24.2 (75.6)
Mean daily minimum °C (°F)	23.6 (74.5)	23.7 (74.7)	23.2 (73.8)	21.6 (70.9)	19.3 (66.7)	17.5 (63.5)	16.9 (62.4)	17.3 (63.1)	18.4 (65.1)	20.0 (68.0)	21.4 (70.5)	22.9 (73.2)	20.5 (68.9)
Record low °C (°F)	15.0 (59.0)	18.2 (64.8)	16.8 (62.2)	13.0 (55.4)	11.1 (52.0)	9.7 (49.5)	9.0 (48.2)	9.0 (48.2)	10.8 (51.4)	10.1 (50.2)	14.7 (58.5)	13.8 (56.8)	9.0 (48.2)
Average precipitation mm (inches)	225.1 (8.86)	227.1 (8.94)	194.1 (7.64)	132.4 (5.21)	121.8 (4.80)	93.1 (3.67)	106.4 (4.19)	70.6 (2.78)	40.8 (1.61)	77.8 (3.06)	91.9 (3.62)	174.3 (6.86)	1,555.4 (61.24)
Average precipitation days (≥ 1 mm)	13.8	13.2	12.3	11.1	8.9	8.3	8.9	6.5	5.3	7.2	8.1	11.0	114.6
Average relative humidity (%)	81	79	82	81	80	80	80	78	76	78	80	80	80
Mean monthly sunshine hours	256.5	222.4	222.7	205.8	223.5	209.5	211.5	241.7	236.5	240.1	232.9	236.1	2,739.2
Source 1: NOAA (sun, 1961-1990)
Source 2: Deutscher Wetterdienst (humidity, 1951–1967), Meteo Climat (record highs and lows)

== Culture ==
=== Religion ===
The majority of its population are Christian, though almost all religions practised in Madagascar are found in Fort-Dauphin.

- FJKM - Fiangonan'i Jesoa Kristy eto Madagasikara (Church of Jesus Christ in Madagascar)
- FLM - Fiangonana Loterana Malagasy (Malagasy Lutheran Church)
- Roman Catholic Diocese of Tolagnaro includes a huge site with a primary school, middle school, a large cathedral and a smaller church in town. Near the Marillac Airport are the Sisters of Marillac à Fort Dauphin and St. Vincentienne Marillac, a large private Catholic school.
- FFPM - (United Pentecostal Church of Madagascar)
- EEM Eklesia Episkopaly Malagasy (Anglican Church of Madagascar)
- Eglise Rhema Terre de Sel

Fort Dauphin was the headquarters of American Lutheran missionaries American Lutheran Church who worked in southern Madagascar starting in 1888 for almost 100 years.

The Lutheran missionaries also traded land above the original Fort Dauphin harbour for what was then a sand dune. There is also a section of the town's cemetery where American Lutheran missionaries and several others are buried.

The Mahovoky Hotel and Annex and the American style homes in the forest at Libanona were part of this mission.

== Infrastructure ==
=== Roads ===
- the National Road 12a, from Fort-Dauphin to Vangaindrano.
- the National Road 13, from Fort-Dauphin to Ambovombe and Ihosy.

=== Airport ===
- Tolagnaro Airport

=== Seaport ===
- Port d'Ehoala

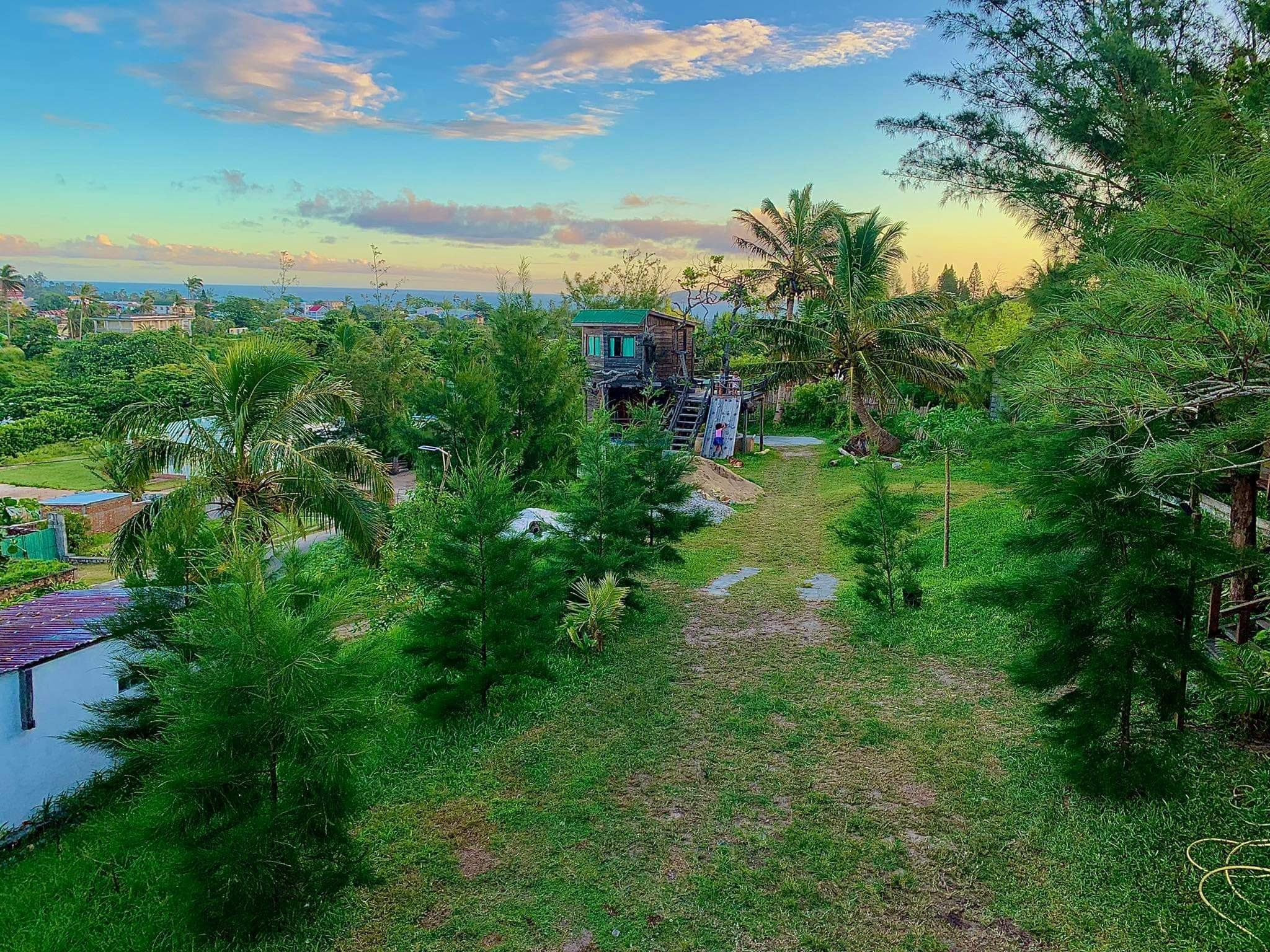
View towards Ankoba beach from a hill in the center of Fort Dauphin

== Education ==
There are 161 public primary schools in the district of Fort-Dauphin, 8 public colleges and 1 public lycée. There are also 32 private primary schools, 5 private colleges and 2 private lycées.

There is one certified French School at the primary level, École primaire française de Fort-Dauphin, and a middle school and high school (college et lycée) AEFE, and Lycee La Clairefontaine.

=== Research ===
In 1995 and 2006, Malagasy agronomists and American political ecologists studied the production of Catharanthus roseus around Fort Dauphin and Ambovombe and its export as a natural source of the alkaloids used to make vincristine, vinblastine and other vinca alkaloid cancer drugs. Their research focused on the wild collection of periwinkle roots and leaves from roadsides and fields and its industrial cultivation on large farms.

== Gallery ==
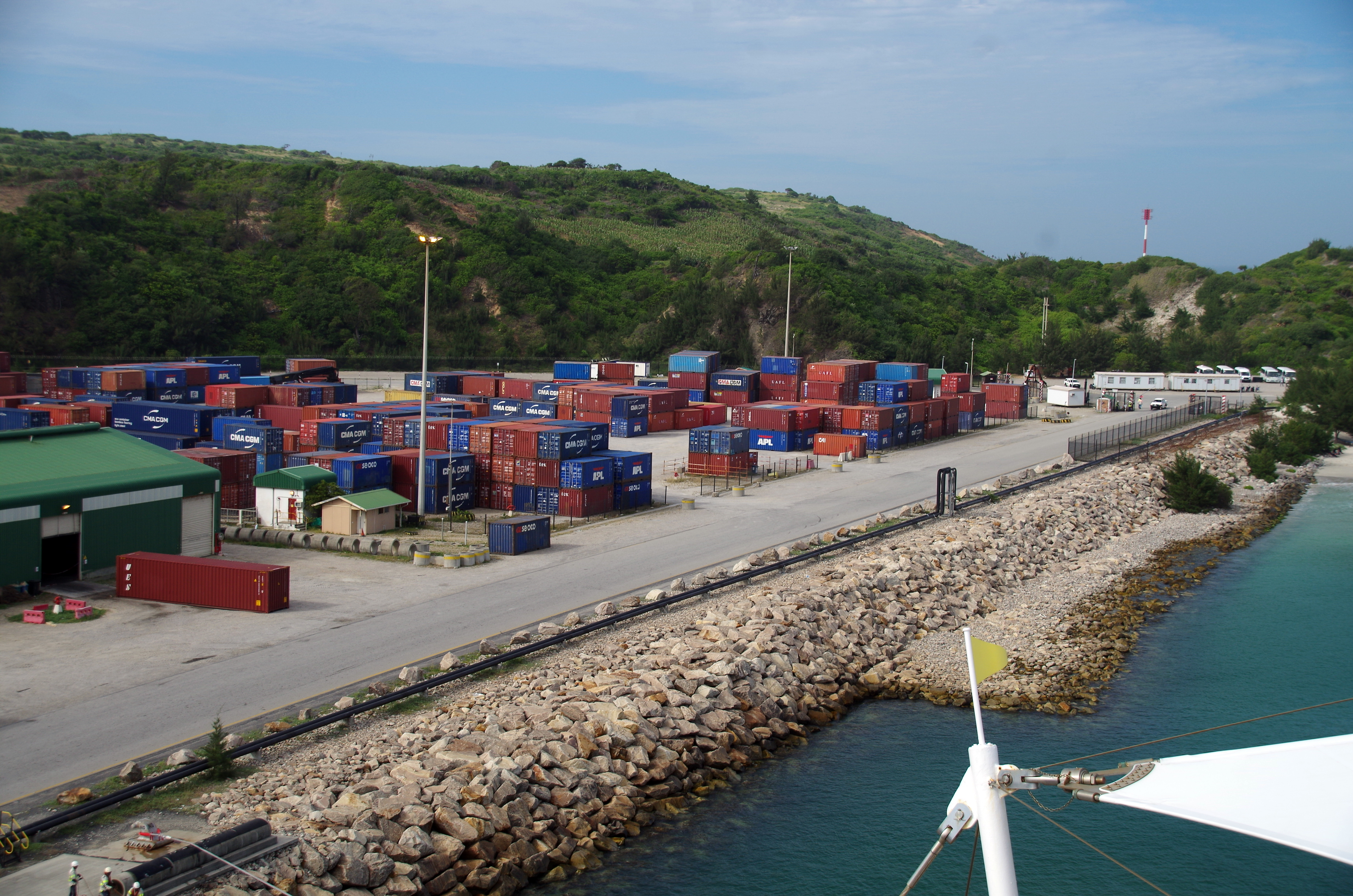
Port d'Ehoala in 2023

New port and access roads under construction in April 2007

Libanona Beach, Tôlagnaro in April 2007

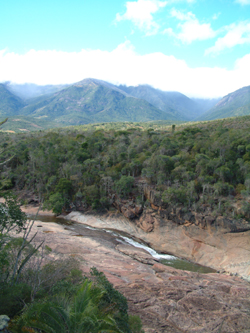
Andohahela National Park

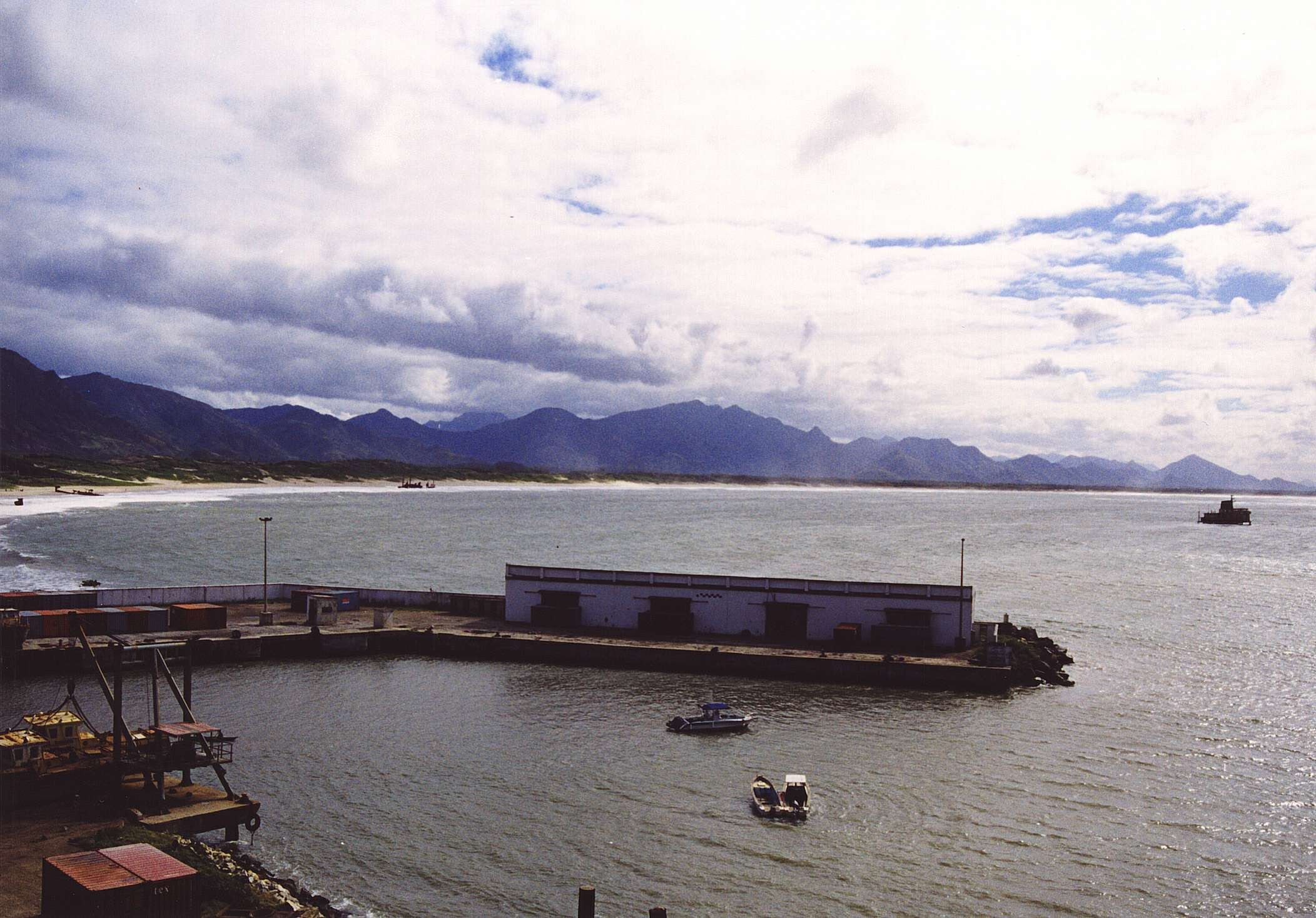
Old port

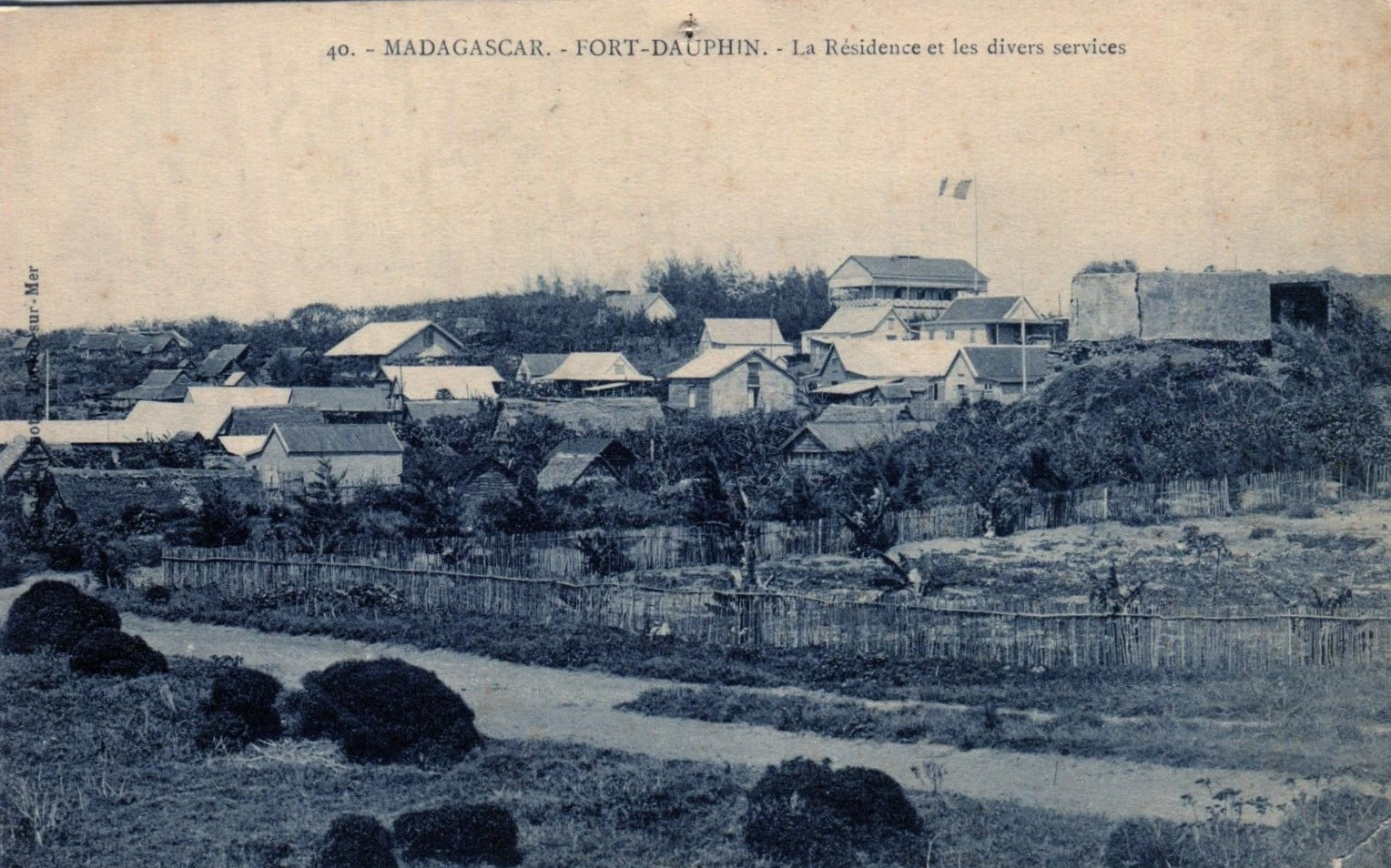
Fort Dauphin in 1900

== Notable resident ==
- Abraham Samuel, pirate, led a combined pirate-Antanosy kingdom from Fort Dauphin from 1697 until he died there in 1705.
