= Anôsy =

Administrative region of Madagascar

- Region
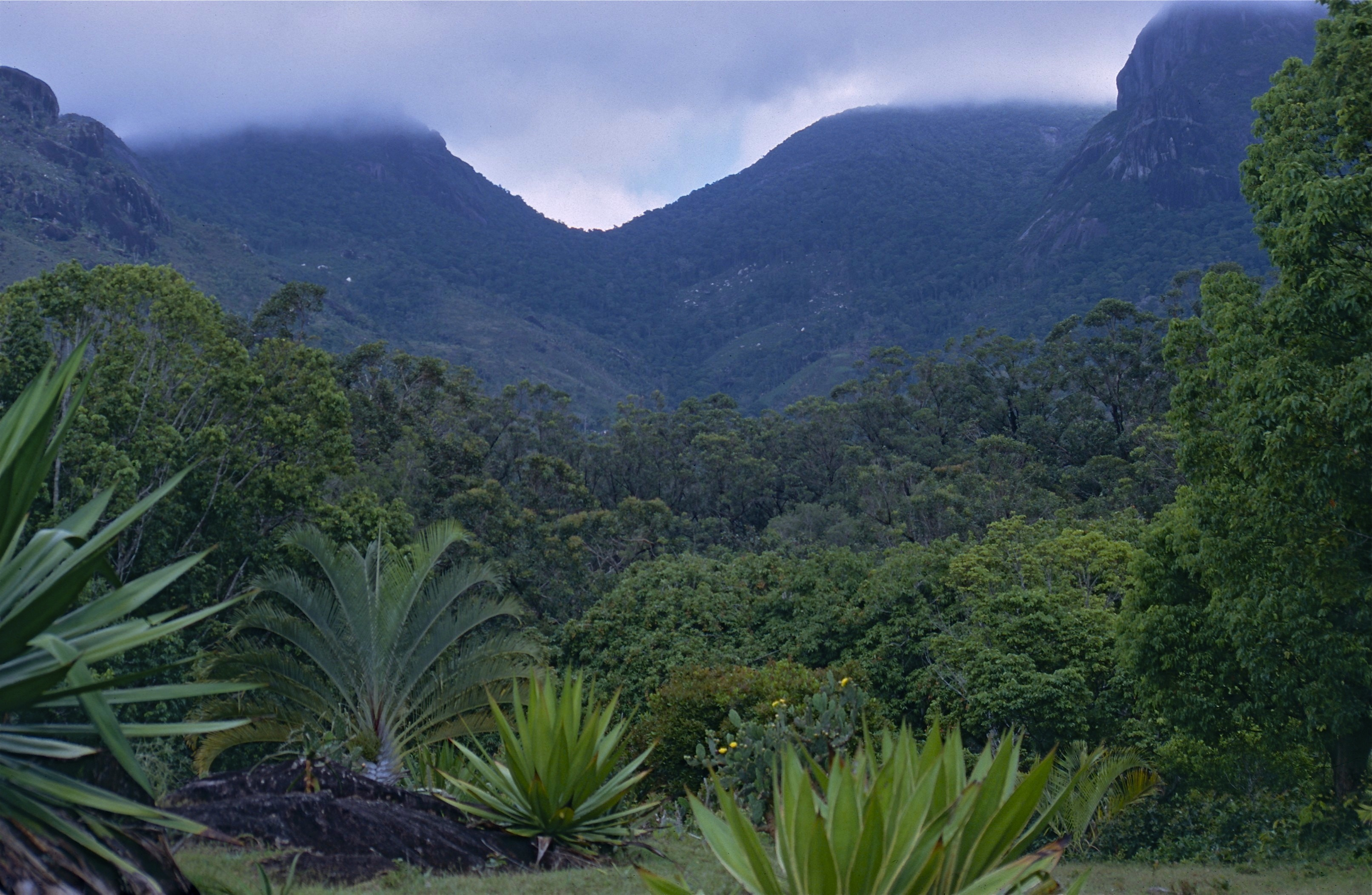
- Nahampoana Reserve (includes Dypsis decaryi)

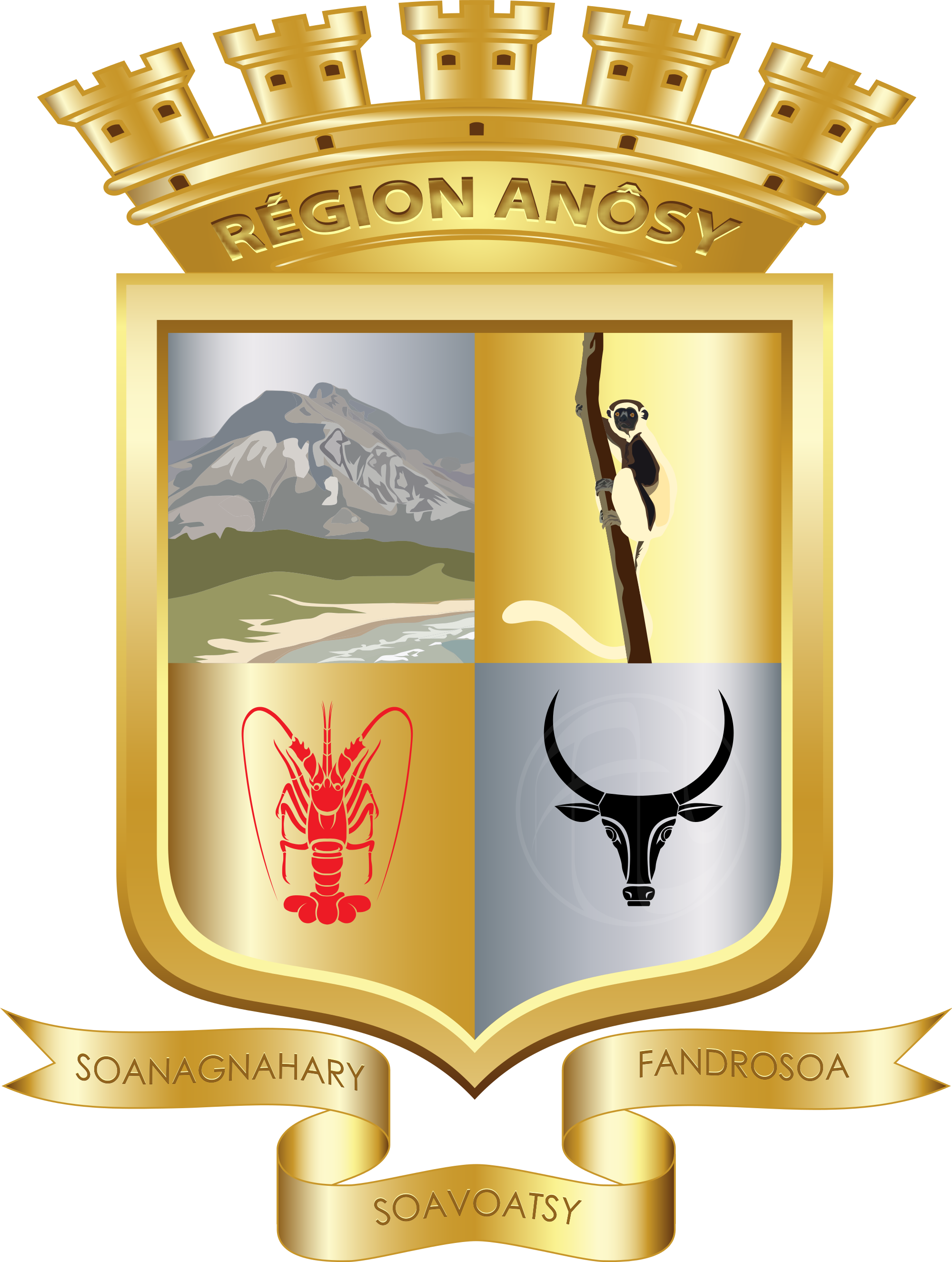
- Coat of arms

- Location in Madagascar
- Coordinates: 24°06′S 46°18′E
- Country: Madagascar
- Capital: Fort Dauphin

Government
  - Governor: Jocelyn Raharimbola

Area
  - Total: 25,731 km^{2} (9,935 sq mi)
- Elevation: 327 m (1,073 ft)

Population (2018)
  - Total: 809,313
  - Density: 31.453/km^{2} (81.462/sq mi)
- Time zone: UTC3 (EAT)
- Postal code: 603, 613 and 614
- HDI (2018): 0.428 low · 19th of 22

Anôsy is one of the 23 regions of Madagascar. It is located in the southeast of the country, on the eastern side of what was once the Toliara Province. The name Anôsy means "island(s)" in Malagasy.

Due to a strategic sea route running along its coast, Anosy had been an important crossroads for the Malagasy, Muslims, and Europeans. In the mid-1600s, it was the location of the first French colonial settlement in the Indian Ocean. The region was part of the Imerina Kingdom for much of the 1800s and part of the French colony of Madagascar from the late 1800s to 1960.

Its exports have included human slaves (shipped to the Mascarene Islands and the United States in the 1700s), live cattle (exported to Réunion for almost 300 years), sisal, natural rubber, rosy periwinkle, graphite, uranothorianite, lobster, sapphires, and ilmenite. Due to its biodiversity and unique wildlife, efforts commenced in the 1980s to promote environmental conservation and tourism in the region.

The region suffers from poverty; 80% of inhabitants lack access to clean water, 16% suffer from serious respiratory illnesses, and literacy is less than 20%.

== History ==
=== Early history ===
The early history of Anôsy is based primarily on archeological digs in the Efaho valley, just west of Fort-Dauphin. These 11th–13th century sites on the coastal dunes were small (0.5 ha [1.2 acres] in size) and seasonal or temporary, based on the need to move to find food. Activities focused on fishing, cultivation of tubers and hunting. Iron working was also present. Trade was limited to the northeast, along the coast, and formed a very simple economic and social system.

Evidence suggests that between the 13th and 15th centuries, those living in Anosy were working chlorite schist which was exchanged through the trade network for Chinese greenware pottery. A Chinese nautical map from 1315 shows Madagascar's coastline, winds and currents. Settlements grew slightly, primarily located on the flood plains and coastal lagoons, with cultivation of sweet potatoes and further development of iron working. In the early 14th century, a Gujarat ship wrecked off the Anosy coast; it has been theorized that the stranded Gujarati went north to found the Zarabehava dynasty of Antesaka, though some scholars disagree.

=== Zafiraminia dynasty ===
In the 16th century, the Zafiraminia (descendants of the Muslim Ramini) arrived in present-day Anosy and moved into the Efaho valley after being defeated by the Antambahoaka people to the north. The Zafiraminia had lived in Madagascar from about the 13th century and had assimilated into the Malagasy population; they did not have Islamic institutions though they retained Arabic script and several socio-religious practices. The Zafiraminia introduced the use of wooden huts, owning cattle as a sign of wealth, and established a dynasty that lasted 200 years.

The Zafiraminia established a stratified society with elaborate rituals, aided by their literacy, which was viewed as a kind of magic. Their settlements were further inland, 2 to 7.5 ha (5 to 19 acres) in size, and may have been fortified with ditches and wooden palisades.

=== European contact and Jesuit mission ===
While the Zafiraminia moved into Anôsy from the north, Europeans began arriving from the south. On 10 August 1500, a Portuguese crew – whose ship had been separated from the 2nd Portuguese India Armada during a storm – became the first Europeans to see Madagascar, at the southern coast near present-day Fort-Dauphin. They named it Ilha de São Lourenço ("Saint-Laurent" in French). There were at least five shipwrecks on this coast between 1504 and 1507, and historian Mike Pearson believes some of the Portuguese survivors built the fort Tranovato (English: house of stone), a 10-metre-square (33 ft) stone blockhouse located on a hill 9 km (5.6 mi) west of present-day Fort-Dauphin. Others believe it was erected a generation later, but it is likely the first European building on Madagascar, and sheltered shipwrecked sailors awaiting rescue. Other shipwrecked sailors were able to assimilate, possibly aided by being light-skinned like the ruling Zafiraminia who claimed to be descended from Arabs. On 4 August 1508, Diogo Lopes de Sequeira arrived on a Portuguese trade mission, recovering two shipwreck survivors who served as a Malagasy translators for contact and resupply. Trading colonies were attempted by the Portuguese and the French, but initial efforts were short-lived and abandoned. Shipwrecks continued and conditions at Anosy led cartographer Jean Parmentier to describe the waters as "the ocean without reason".

In 1613, a Portuguese expedition to Madagascar visited the stone fort at Travovato, which was occupied by a local king, Chambanga. A treaty of friendship was agreed, trade was opened, and a church was built for Jesuit missionaries to begin evangelism. A dispute broke out when the king apparently refused an offer to send his son Drian-Ramaka to Goa for Catholic education; the sailors seized the boy by force and their ship was briefly attacked before sailing to Goa. In April 1616 the Jesuits returned to Anosy to exchange Drian-Ramaka for Chambanga's other sons, which the king refused; following accusations, and realizing their missionary work was in jeopardy, the Jesuits settled for a distant relation of the king. Chambanga became further distrustful when the Portuguese began prospecting for gold and silver; he suspended trade, attempting to starve them out of Anosy. This continued when Drian-Ramaka succeeded his father, and respected the folk religion instead of embracing Catholicism. Suffering in isolation and having baptized only one Malagasy person over a year, the Jesuits left Anôsy in 1617.

=== Early French settlements ===
Beginning in 1604, French King Henry IV began sending ships to Madagascar to compete with the Dutch colonies at the Gold Coast of Africa. In 1642, Cardinal Richelieu sought possession of Madagascar for France, granting trading rights to Captain Rigault and associates who created the first French East India Company. A French settlement was established at Manafiafy in Anôsy. There were many deaths in the first months, likely due to malaria and dysentery in the swampy area, and the settlement was moved 40 km (25 mi) southwest to the peninsula of Taolanara where they built what was later named Fort Dauphin, France's first colony in the Indian Ocean. The site was 46 metres (150 ft) above sea level, and with a redoubt built across the peninsula was defensible from sea and land.

The French found Dian Ramaka to be friendly; their settlement sites were at the edge of the Zafiraminia's world and did not cause an affront. Sieur Jacques de Pronis, the first governor of the French East India Company, married a Zafindraminia noblewoman. However, Pronis angered the colonists who put him in chains; following his rescue, the rebels – both French and Malagasy – were banished to Réunion Island. Étienne de Flacourt took over as governor, and sought to establish several colonies in Madagascar to resupply European ships travelling to the Indies, obtaining food from the Malagasy through trade or by force, and selling indigo, tobacco and sugarcane to fund colonial expansion. By this time, rice and cattle had become the primary food sources. According to historian R. K. Kent, Anosy was one of the most-densely populated parts of Madagascar with considerable agricultural surpluses. The Malagasy traded for ceramics from China, England, France and Portugal.

Successive governors of Fort Dauphin in the mid-17th century sought to conquer Anosy by wresting control from the Zafiraminia kings, who had united under Dian Ramack (and later, his son Andriampanolahy). Several military campaigns pillaged and burned villages, killed and enslaved Malagasy, and stole tens of thousands of cattle. The Malagasy made reprisals with massacres, poisonings, and captured and burned Fort Dauphin. During the same period, missionary work was conducted by the Lazarist Congregation of the Mission. In 1674, after the French East India Company had twice been reorganized due to poor profits, the rebuilt Fort Dauphin was evacuated and the colony abandoned. The colonial failure was a bitter experience for the French, who left behind as many as 4,000 French casualties, and was a source of political embarrassment for 200 years.

=== Feudal rule ===
Conflict continued in Anôsy following the French evacuation. When shipwrecked pirates took shelter at Fort Dauphin in 1697, their leader, Abraham Samuel, a mulatto from Martinique, was installed as a king. Until his death in 1705, Samuel led pirate–Anôsy forces in constant warfare with Antanosy king Diamarang Diamera. The Zafiraminia also attempted to regain control, without success; they faced a number of revolts. The number and size of settlements shrank, and moved further inland.

Frenchman Louis Laurent de Maudave arrived to rebuild Fort Dauphin as a supply base in 1768. He found that there were 35 rulers in Anôsy, many of whom were at war with one another, and none of whom governed more than 3,000 people. He signed 30 treaties with local kings, making alliances by supplying them with muskets (over 10,000 muskets and 50 tons of gunpowder were sold). However, the French government abolished the French East India Company the following year, and Maudave's trading settlement was abandoned. At about the time of the French departure, the Zafiriminia kingdom also fell, having been ravaged by warfare since the mid-1600s.

In 1819, the French again reopened Fort Dauphin, after negotiating with the Zafiraminia chief Rabefania. The chief sought French protection from the Imerina Kingdom which was seeking to conquer the whole of Madagascar. Fort Dauphin continued to export cattle, and also became a slaving base and operated a rum distillery.

=== Merina control ===
An army of the Imerina Kingdom of central Madagascar, numbering 3,000–4,000 soldiers, moved down the coast of Anosy and took Fort Dauphin on 14 March 1825, at which point the Imerina Kingdom controlled the entire eastern coast of Madagascar. The fort was garrisoned by 800 Imerina troops armed with muskets which, along with garrisons at other coastal towns, controlled shipping & trade. Most of Anosy, however, resisted the brutal treatment by the Imerina and was effectively self-ruled. The Imerina pursued a policy of isolationism and dismantled treaties with England and France.

Successive Imerina monarchs were alternately influenced by the French and English. In 1869, Imerina Queen Ranavalona II converted to Christianity. A church was built at Fort Dauphin and attendance made mandatory. Evangelists from the London Missionary Society later took leadership of the church.

=== Franco-Malagasy Wars ===
France invaded Madagascar in 1883, to counter the growing British influence in the Indian Ocean. This first Madagascar expedition concentrated mainly on the north of Madagascar, where Imerina power was centered. This created an opportunity for the Antanôsy to revolt and seize Fort Dauphin, though the Imerina reclaimed it in 1884. In 1885, the fort was bombarded by a French warship and evacuated.

In 1887–88, Norwegian missionary Nielsen-Lund described the Antanôsy population as "very scattered" and ruled by 30 feudal kings, and that northern Anôsy was a lawless place. A Lutheran church and school was established outside Fort Dauphin, but the support given by the Queen of Imerina caused the missionaries to be viewed as collaborators by the Antanôsy. In the following years, additional churches were established at Evatraha, Mandromondromotry, and Mahatalaky. In 1891, natural rubber was discovered in western Anôsy, and within a year 1,680 tons were exported.

The strategic importance of Madagascar had declined following the opening of the Suez Canal. Britain and France redefined their spheres of influence in Africa; Britain gained control of Zanzibar in return for recognizing Madagascar as a French protectorate. The French then launched the second Madagascar expedition in 1894. Again, the invaders concentrated themselves mainly on the Imerina strongholds, and conquered north and central Madagascar in 1895. In Anôsy, the Antandroy overran a number of European trading stations, forcing the foreigners out and plundering their stores.

=== French colony ===
Madagascar officially became a French colony on 6 August 1896, and French troops took control of Fort Dauphin. Europeans reported a great deal of insecurity elsewhere in southern Madagascar. The interior of Anôsy was ruled by Antanôsy king Rabefagnatrika, who was a rival of pro-French Manambaro king Rabefially. Southern Madagascar was conquered by the French in 1898, using counter-insurgency methods developed in Indochina.

In 1897, the French governor reintroduced the Imerina labour tax, requiring every able-bodied male to provide 50 days of unpaid labour per year. Head taxes were also imposed, under penalty of forced labour, in efforts to increase agricultural production and tax revenues. Roads were built and plantations established for European companies and settlers. Many villages were relocated along the new highways. Activities of Roman Catholic and Lutheran missionaries increased.

The harsh regime and disregard for Malagasy culture were met by a number of small revolts and raids, which culminated in a general uprising in 1904–1905. While the uprising was sparked in the north, the southeast had become fertile ground for revolution. Antanosy king king Befanatrika led rebels south into Anôsy, and in December 1904 captured Esira, Fort Dauphin, and Manambaro, with widespread looting. While Protestants generally supported the uprising, Catholics opposed it and a number of Catholic churches were burned by the rebels. Following the revolt, the French closed the Lutheran schools and churches, believing them complicit. The region also suffered from smallpox and locusts during this time.

In 1926–27, the head tax was almost doubled and a three-year conscription system instituted to provide more labour for colony construction projects. The government also continued to seize lands for these projects, plantations, and French settlers.

During World War II, Madagascar was the site of a 1942 campaign between Allied and Vichy French forces. The fighting was concentrated in the north and central regions; the Vichy governor-general had retreated steadily southward, and surrendered rather than enter Anôsy. These incidents and the British occupation further tarnished the prestige of the French colonial government. Nationalist and pro-independence sentiments strengthened following the return of men forced into conscription, the continuation of forced labour, and the absence of reforms promised by Charles de Gaulle. When the French government refused to support a democratic process toward Madagascar independence, militant independence leaders gained ground and initiated the Malagasy Uprising (1947–1949).

The uprising began in the east and was immediately followed by the south where it enjoyed particularly strong support and attracted as many as one million peasants to fight. The southern rebels were led by Betsileo former-teacher Michel Radaoroson. His leadership was usurped in August 1947 by Lehoaha, whose insurgents were better armed. The intensity and cruelty of the French response was unprecedented in French colonial history, and military records of the conflict were classified.

=== Madagascar Republic ===
Madagascar gained independence by referendum in 1958. Political power of the new government was consolidated amongst the Imerina middle-class, and was challenged in 1971 by a peasant uprising in Toliara Province (which included the Anôsy Region). Sisal production in Anosy peaked in 1964 but rapidly declined thereafter. Periwinkle plantations began, as did exports of seaweed to Japan and live lobsters to Europe.

Student protests joined by a general strike and rioting led to a state of emergency, a military government fraught with ethnic coups, and the 1975 establishment of the Democratic Republic of Madagascar. This second republic pursued socialist reforms with the aims of achieving rapid economic and cultural development. In the 1980s, the rapid growth of Fort-Dauphin created deforestation in Anôsy, which became a high-priority area for international conservation efforts. The World Wildlife Fund began working in Andohahela National Park. Meanwhile, QIT-Fer et Titane established an office in Fort-Dauphin and began a joint venture to mine ilmenite.

Politically weakened by the dissolution of the Soviet Union, the socialist regime transitioned to the Third Republic of Madagascar in 1992. Ecotourism in Anosy grew rapidly in the early and mid-1990s, but temporarily collapsed during 2007–2009 due to the complete booking of Fort-Dauphin hotels for QMM employees and contractors.

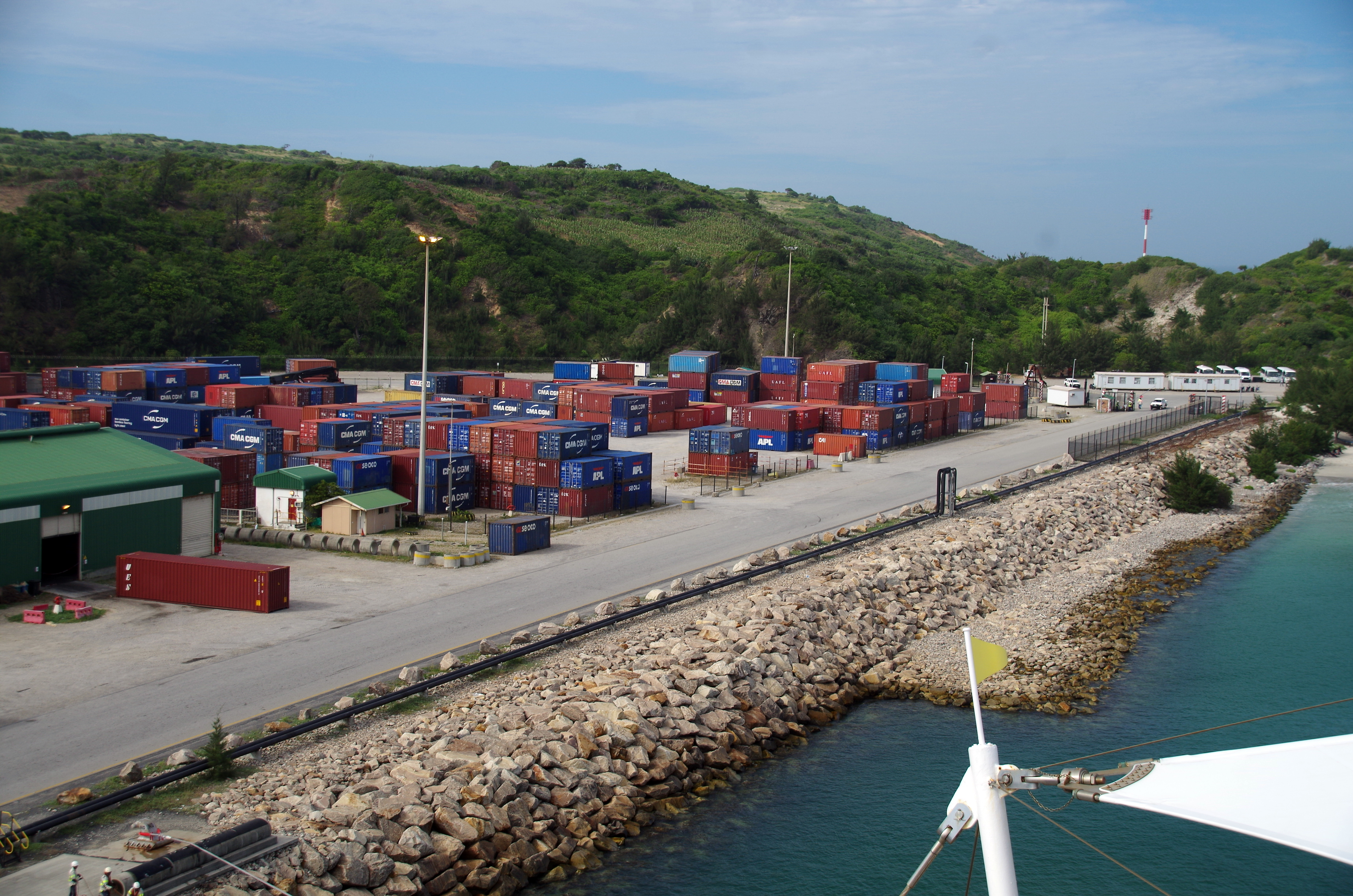
Port d'Ehola

Fort-Dauphin suffered a cholera outbreak in 2000–2001 and syphilis outbreak in 2007, the latter resulting in a state of emergency. The World Bank named the town as one of three sites for its Integrated Growth Poles project. Port d'Ehola is completed in 2009, enabling QMM to export Ilmenite to Canada. In 2011, QMM takes over electricity production for Fort-Dauphin. Vigilantism rises in Anôsy in response to banditry, with over 100 extralegal executions in 2012.

== Geography ==
General references for the geography section: Vincelette et al. (2008) and is primarily about the immediate Fort-Dauphin region.

Anôsy is a region in southeastern Madagascar, which covers 25,731 km^{2} (9,935 sq mi). It borders Androy region to the southwest, across the Mandrare River. To the west is Atsimo-Andrefana, to the north is Ihorombe region, and to the northeast is Atsimo-Atsinanana region. To the east and south is the Indian Ocean. The region is approximately 150 kilometres (93 mi) wide along its coastline and extends roughly 250 km (160 mi) inland. Anôsy's capital and most-populous city is Tolagnaro (formerly Fort Dauphin), located about halfway along the region's coast and 1,122 km (697 mi) south of the national capital of Antananarivo.

Anôsy means "island" or "islands" in Malagasy. It may have been named for the island in the Fanjahira river (now Efaho river) where the Zafiraminia first settled when they arrived in the 16th century. Another theory is that the name means "land of the islands" because of the many temporary islands created when the Efaho valley floods during the rainy season.

Along the ocean are coastal lagoons and about 50 km (31 mi) of sandy, rolling coastal hills that butt up against the Vohimana mountains. This mountain range dominates the area, terminating just outside Fort-Dauphin at Mount Bezavona (Pic St. Louis), which stands at 529 metres (1,736 ft).

The interior bedrock is granite, with cordierite gneiss exposed where erosion had occurred along the coast. The sand dunes along the coast, which average 18 m (59 ft) in depth, have mineral deposits of ilmenite, zircon, rutile and monazite.

There are three primary hydrologic drainage areas in Anôsy: the Mountain Zone, the Bedrock Plain, and the Coastal Sands. The Mountain Zone covers 30% of the total catchment area and is distinguished by steep slopes, rapid runoff, and clearly defined rivers. The Bedrock Plain has rolling hills with low relief and several large rivers. The Coastal Sands are dunes at the ocean's edge cut with meandering rivers, ribbon lakes, and a series of lagoons and bays which vary in size from a few to two dozen square kilometres. The Coastal Sands can be further subdivided into the Andriambe, Ebakika, Efaho, Fanjahira, Lakandava, Lanirano, Manampanihy, Mandromodromotra, Vatomena, Vatomirindry and Vatorendrika basins.

There are three major rivers in Anôsy: the Mandrare River along the southwestern border, the Efaho (formerly called the Fanjahira) just west of Fort-Dauphin, and the Manampanihy which drains the Ranomafana valley, emptying into the ocean at Manantenina. Other rivers in the Anosy region include the Isoanala, Manambolo, Mangoky, Menarandra and Isoanala.

=== Climate ===
The average temperature in Fort-Dauphin ranges from 26 °C (79 °F) in January–February to 20 °C (68 °F) in July, with ocean temperatures ranging from 25 °C (77 °F) in January–February to 19 °C (66 °F) in June–July. The humidity of Fort-Dauphin ranges from 77 to 84 percent. Rainfall is highest on the eastern side of the mountains. In general, Anôsy is very wet and humid in the northeast and becomes increasingly arid as one moves southwest.

Fort-Dauphin receives 1,800 millimetres (71 in) of annual rainfall. Monthly precipitation is about 150 mm (5.9 in) in November through March, 190 mm (7.5 in)) in April, and less than 100 mm (3.9 in) for September and October. Fort-Dauphin is a windy town, with Force 6 winds (39–49 km/h [24–30 mph]) for 6 to 13 days per month, August through November. The region is occasionally damaged by cyclones, such as Cyclone Deborah in 1975, Cyclone Daisy in 1994, and Cyclone Gretelle in 1997.

=== Protected areas ===
- Kalambatritra Reserve
- Tsitongambarika New Protected Area
- Vohidava Betsimalaho New Protected Area
- Ambatotsirongorongo Special Reserve
- Angavo New Protected Area
- Andohahela National Park. In 1932, the Andohahela natural reserve was created.
- Ambatoatsinanana New Protected Area
- Petriky New Protected Area
- Mandena New Protected Area
- Ankodida New Protected Area
- the privately owned Berenty Reserve, near Amboasary Sud

In 1996, Anôsy was recognized as one of the most ecologically diverse regions of Madagascar. In 2014, Fort-Dauphin coast was identified as seriously threatened due to rising sea levels, landslides, and coastal erosion".

== Demographics ==
The region had a population of 809,313 in 2018. At its present growth rate, it is expected to double its population in 15 years. The region is administratively divided into three districts; population densities are 52 inhabitants per square kilometre (130/sq mi) in the Tolagnaro District, 21/km^{2} (54/sq mi) in the Amboasary Atsimo District, and 14/km^{2} (36/sq mi) in the Betroka District.

The people who have historically lived in Anôsy are known as the Antanosy people. They may be more accurately described as "those from Anôsy" given the region's history. The Antanôsy live primarily in the east, along the coast and coastal rivers. There are also Antandroy living in the southwest, especially in the Tolagnaro District and in the Amboasary-Sud District, along with other Malagasy people from other parts of Madagascar. The rural interior Betroka District is chiefly inhabited by Bara people. There are also Asians who own many shops in urban centres and Europeans working in conservation, mining, tourism or for the Catholic Church. While there had been many French nationals living in Anôsy during the French occupation of Madagascar, most had left by the mid-1970s.

Most of the people who live in Anôsy are very poor, with an estimated GDP per capita in 2004 of just $180, when the national average was $210. Eighty percent of its inhabitants don't have access to clean water, one in six suffer from serious respiratory illness, literacy is less than 20%, and 65% of the watershed slopes are highly degraded.

The majority of those living in Anôsy practice traditional folk religions. The two largest Christian denominations in the Anosy region are the Roman Catholic and the Malagasy Lutheran Church, both established in Fort Dauphin (also called: Tolagnaro) in the 1890s. The Church of Jesus Christ in Madagascar (FJKM) has several congregations in the Anosy region as do several other Protestant denominations. There is also a small Muslim community.

== Administration, services and infrastructure ==
=== Administrative divisions ===
Anôsy Region is divided into three districts, which are sub-divided into 64 communes.

- Amboasary Sud District - 14 communes
- Betroka District - 20 communes
- Taolanaro District - 24 communes

=== Education ===
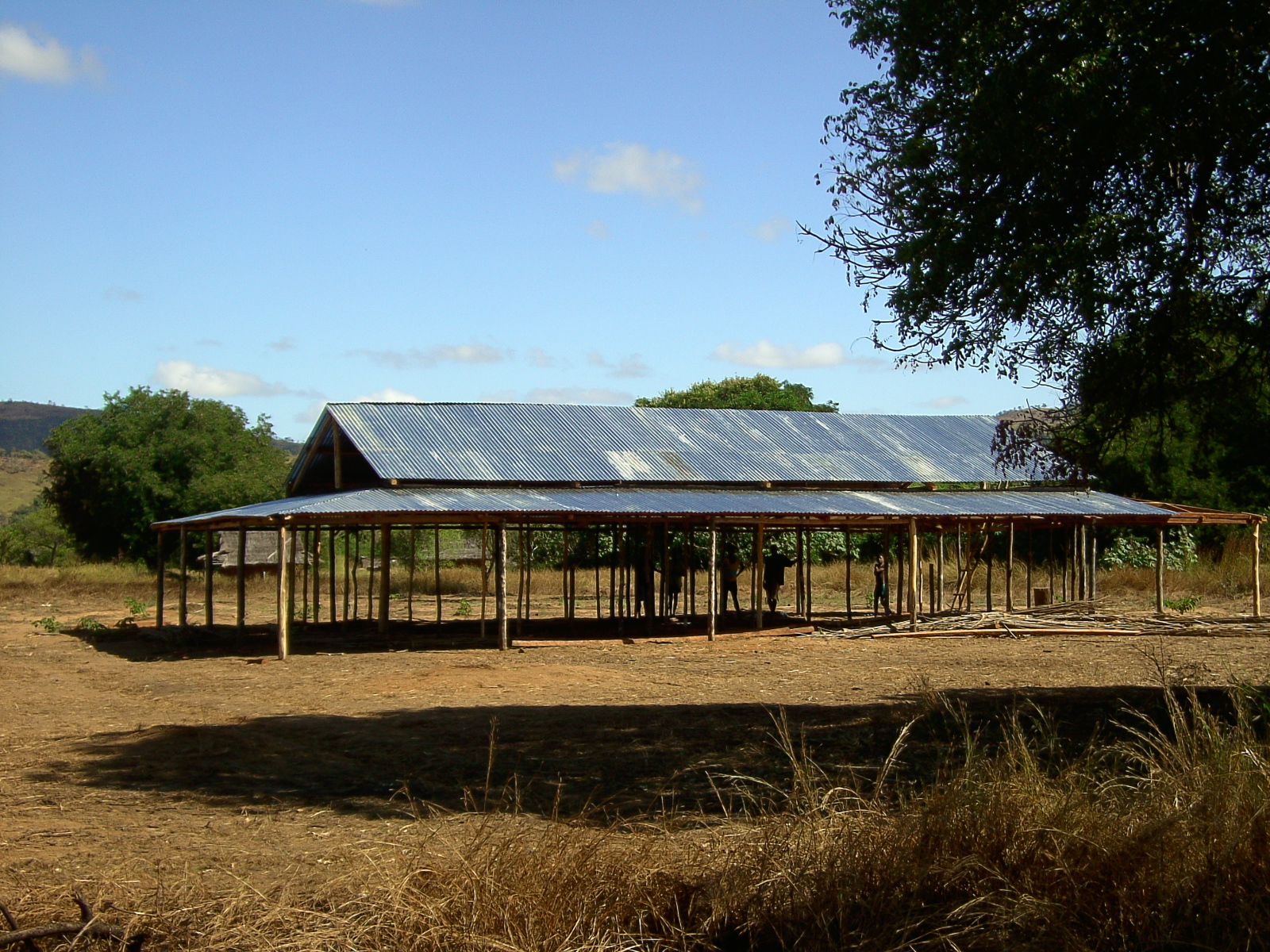
a rural village school in Tamotamo

As of 1997–98, literacy at the primary level in Anôsy was 22% for boys and 23% for girls. Literacy was below 20% in some rural areas.

There are 511 public primary schools in the Anôsy (2007–2008). 179 are in Amboasary Sud, 171 in Betroka and 161 in Taolagnaro (Fort Dauphin). Not all of the villages dispose of a school. There are 25 CEGs (college of general education) and 3 lycées, furthermore 1 technical lycée in Betroka.

Next to the public schools there were (2008): 68 private primary schools, 12 private colleges and 4 lycées (2 in Amboasary Sud and 2 in Taolagnaro).

=== Healthcare ===
Healthcare is a challenge, as 80% of the population doesn't have access to clean water. In 2010, WHO/UNICEF estimated that only 1 in 10 Malagasy had access to improved sanitation facilities, resulting in high child mortality. 40% of children in rural areas die before age 5.

=== Transportation ===
Fort-Dauphin is serviced by Air Madagascar, with daily flights to and from the national capital, Antananarivo to the Tolagnaro Airport.

Only 50% of roadways in Anôsy were passable in 2009. Many roads are closed during the rainy season, and four-wheel drive is recommended. A paved road was built connecting Fort-Dauphin–Amboasary Sud–Ambovombe, but most of the surface has been wrecked. Some road repairs have been conducted with loans from the World Bank, and by international companies seeking access to the region's natural resources.

Buses run both north and west from Fort-Dauphin. Many are overcrowded and in poor repair, and some are simply trucks with metal benches.

Ehoala Port, opened in 2009, has greatly improved Anosy's shipping, and was developed for export of ilmenite.

==== Roads ====
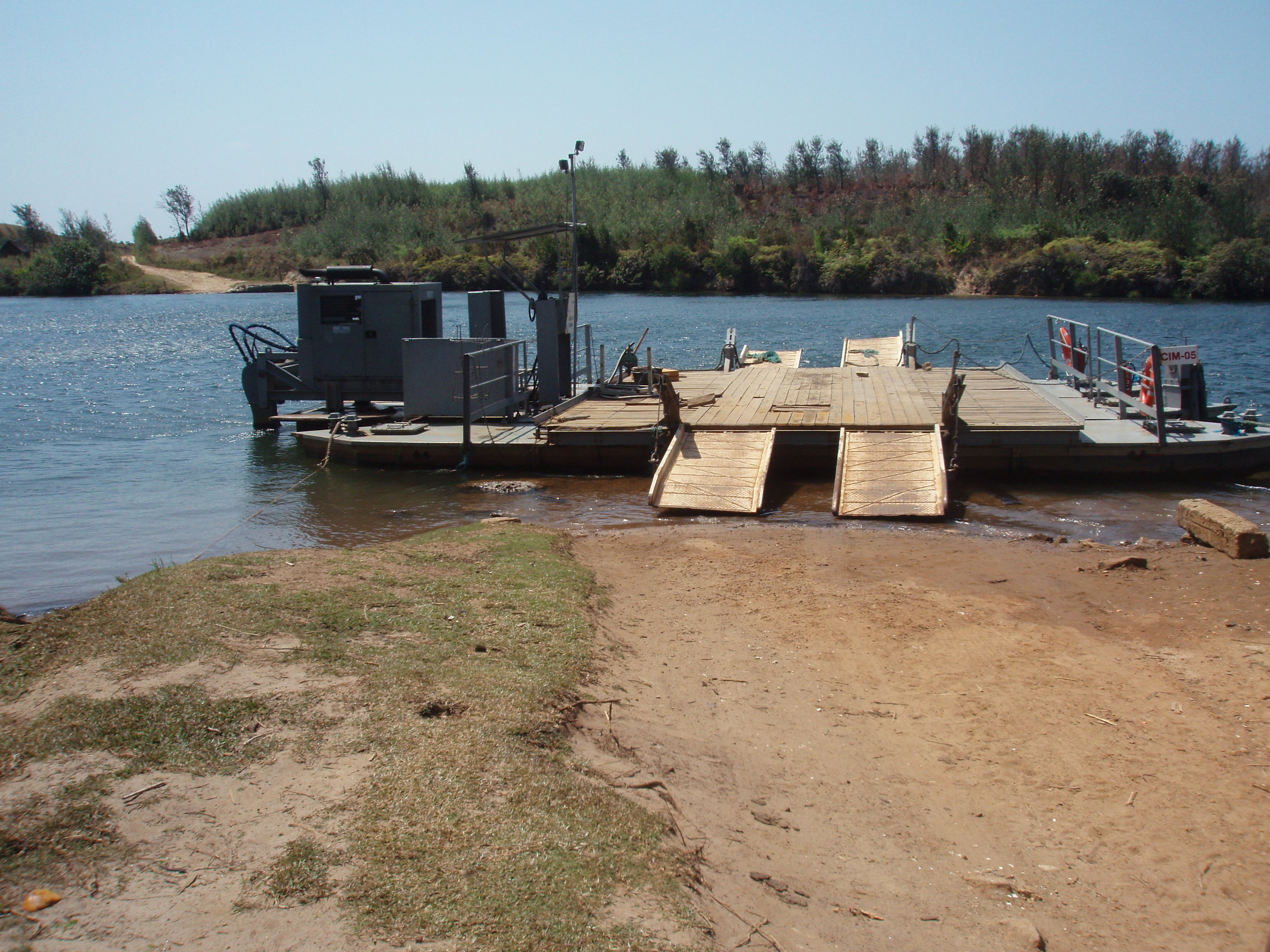
National road 12a, ferry over the Esama river

- the National Road 12a, from Fort-Dauphin to Vangaindrano.
- the National Road 13, from Fort-Dauphin to Ambovombe and Ihosy.
- the Provincial road RIP118 (to the Andohahela National Park).

==== Airports ====
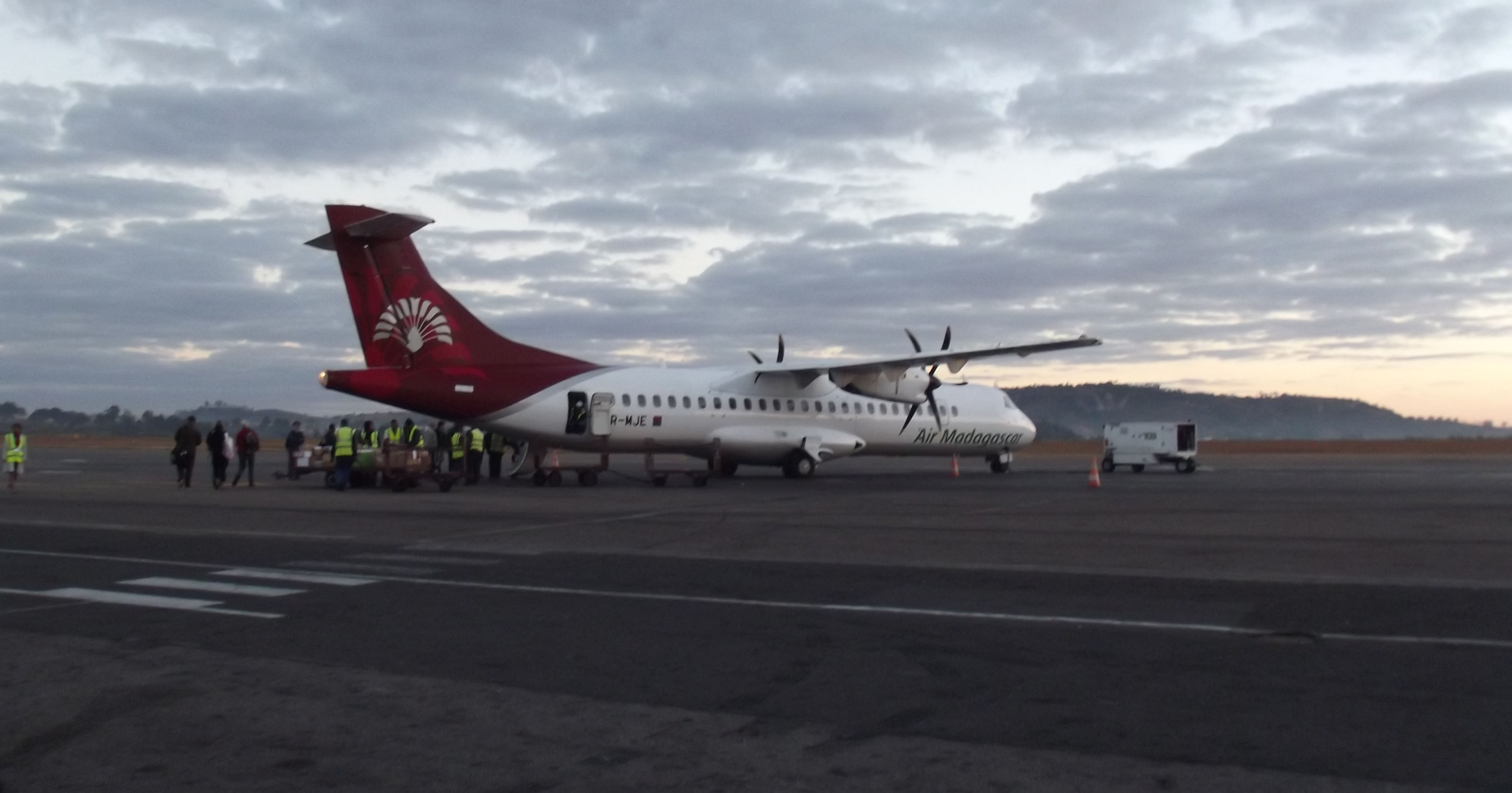
Air Madagascar in Tolanaro airport

- Betroka Airport
- Tolagnaro Airport

=== Electrical infrastructure ===
The only towns in Anôsy with electrical power grids are Fort-Dauphin, Betroka and Amboasary Sud. The growth of Port-Dauphin and poor condition of its generators resulted in mining firm QIT Madagascar Minerals (QMM) assuming responsibility for production of the town's electricity.

As of 2008, rural electrification in Anosy was only 7%.

== Agriculture ==
Subsistence farming is the primary source of income of most people living in Anôsy. Where there is sufficient rainfall, rice is the primary food crop, though in most cases only one crop is grown per year. Cassava is a very important food crop for those who can't afford rice year-round, which includes most of the Malagasy in the region. Yields for most crops are low, primarily due to the traditional methods of farming.

=== Cash crops ===
The four major cash crops in the Anôsy region are coffee (primarily from the Ranomafana area), rosy periwinkle (southwestern coast of Anôsy and coast of Androy), sisal (Amboasary area) and Peppercorn trees.

Malagasy rosy periwinkle was researched by Eli Lilly beginning in 1958 for its potential use in preserving insulin. This was unsuccessful, but chemotherapy agents were discovered which have been credited with increasing the survival rate for childhood leukemia.

Sisal cultivation was tested in 1928 and intensive farming practices were begun in the 1950s, reaching peak production in the mid-1960s. The development of synthetic fibres has largely replaced it in the international market, but sisal remains an important export.

Peppercorn tree are produced around 280 t in the region of Ifarantsa.

=== Fishing ===
Income from fishing is estimated at between 3,000 and 5,000 Malagasy ariary (MGA) in 2010, which was then US$1.50–2.50.

== Mining ==
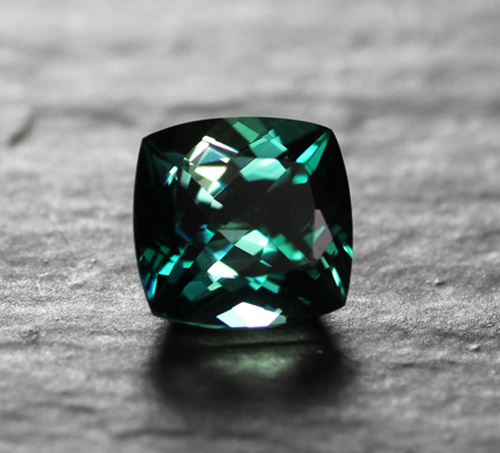
Grandidierite from Tranomaro

Mining has been occurring in Anôsy beginning with the export of mica in the early 1900s. Uranothorianite was mined from the 1950s to the mid-1960s, for several years being Madagascar's second-most valuable export. Sapphires were a major export in the early- to mid-1990s. More recently, Rio Tinto subsidiary owned QIT Madagascar Minerals (QMM), owned 80 percent by mining giant Rio Tinto Group and 20 percent by the Malagasy government, has mined and exported 750,000 tons per year of ilmenite, along with 40,000 tons per year of rutile and zircon. There are also major deposits of bauxite which might be developed in the future, and there has been ongoing exploration for uranium and rare earth minerals.

The 1986 opening of the QMM owned Mandena mine prompted a boost in employment, migration to the area, development of roads and exacerbation of deforestation. The mine contaminated Lake Besaroy in 2014-2015 and was met with mixed reactions from local communities, who held protests in 2013 and 2022.

=== Mica ===
Mica was discovered near Tranomaro in 1912, and can be found in crystalline schists from Fort-Dauphin to Ihosy. There were 50 different companies mining mica in 1947, but demand fell in 1963. The biggest mine is at Ampandandrava, about 250 km (160 mi) from Fort-Dauphin, which exported 1,000 tons of mica in 2010.

=== Uranium ores ===
Uranothorianite is a rich and highly radioactive ore of uranium. It was discovered by French surveyors in Anosy in 1953, and considered of great importance by the French Atomic Energy Commission (CEA). The locals called the dense black rocks vatovy and used them as slingshot ammunition and fishing weights. The CEA established a mining centre at Ambatomika, digging small open-pit mines. Between 1954 and 1963, almost 4,000 tonnes of uranothorianite was mined and exported to France. By 1964 this was Madagascar's second-most valuable export. In 1963, the original Ambindandrakemba mine was exhausted, and the centre was moved 40 km (25 mi) north to Betioky, near the Belafa ore body which was thought to have between 2,000 and 5,000 tons of uranothorianite. Mining ended in 1968, due to the degradation of equipment and the discovery of larger deposits in Gabon and Niger.

In 2005, the Malagasy government conducted aerial magnetic and radiometric surveys of the area, which found thorium and uranium deposits increased to the west. In 2007, drilling by the Canadian firm Pan African Mining Corporation found a site with "high-grade uranium mineralisation grading 4,329 ppm uranium", with deposits as deep as 60 metres. London-based Bekitoly Resources Ltd. acquired exploration rights which include eight of the historical open-pit deposits, and have conducted airborne radiometrics and hyperspectral surveys, ground radiometrics and magnetics, mapping, grab sampling, trenching and drilling. These activities identified numerous areas of interest, with uranium and thorium scintillometer readings of up to 26,257 and 43,215 ppm, respectively. They also discovered numerous rare-earth elements.

=== Titanium ores ===
Between 2009 and 2011, QMM has mined 750,000 tons of ilmenite (a titanium ore) per year for export to Canada. The ilmenite-mining operation also produces 25,000 tons of zircon and 15,000 tons of rutile per year. It has the potential to increase production to 2 million tons of ilmenite per year, with an expected operational lifetime of 40 years. Almost $1 billion was spent developing this mine, including the new harbour at Port d'Ehola.

=== Semi-precious stones ===
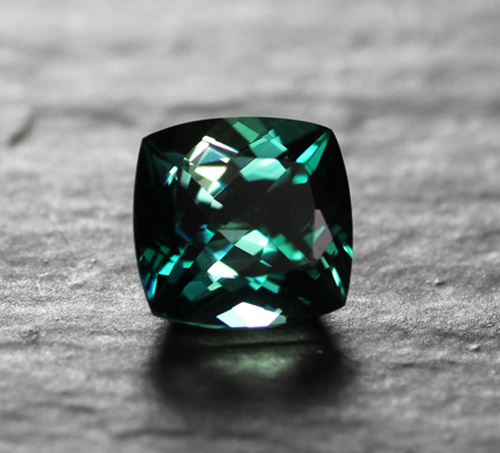
Grandidierite from Tranomaro

Sapphires were first documented in Anôsy by Étienne de Flacourt in 1658, and were described by a French geologist working in the mica mines near Tranomaro in the 1950s. High-quality blue sapphires of up to 35 carats (7.0 g) were found near the village of Andranondambo in 1991, and in the mid-1990s briefly attracted a rush of almost 10,000 miners. A 2004 environmental impact study found the area "highly degraded" with threatened ecosystems.

Tourmaline is a semi-precious gemstone which has been found near Ampasimainty, Ianakafy and Iankaroka, all south of Betroka. It has also been found near Behara and Tranomaro, which are both closer to Amboasary. A 7-centimetre (2.8 in) tourmaline crystal found near Tranomaro was sold for US$2,250.

=== Unexploited mineral resources ===
Exploration studies have documented an estimated 100 million tons of bauxite (an aluminium ore) in a 40-square-kilometre (15 sq mi) area near Manantenina, 100 km (62 mi) north of Fort-Dauphin. It has not yet been mined, largely due to a lack of infrastructure in the area.

There are an estimated 310,000 tons of monazite, a reddish-brown phosphate mineral which contains rare earth metals, in the beach sands near Fort-Dauphin.

== Tourism ==
Anôsy has a high potential for tourism with its pleasant climate, sprawling beaches, and nature reserves with distinctive wildlife (several containing lemurs). Fort-Dauphin has a variety of hotels and has promoted itself as the "Malagasy Riviera" (French: la cote d'Azur Malgache). As with other industries, tourism has been limited by a lack of infrastructure. Popular places to visit include Evatraha, Libanona beach, Lokaro, Manafiafy, Nahampoana and Vinanibe. There are a variety of tourist agencies in Antananarivo and Fort-Dauphin.
