= Zafimiarina =

Malagasy politician

Zafimiarina is a Malagasy politician. A member of the National Assembly of Madagascar, he was elected as a member of the Tiako I Madagasikara party; he represents the constituency of Amboasary Sud.

He was the suppleant of Jean André Soja who was named senator. He was also the mayor of Tsivory before 2008.
