= Mahaly =

- Location in Madagascar
- Coordinates: 24°10′S 46°21′E
- Country: Madagascar
- Region: Anosy
- District: Amboasary Sud

Area
  - Total: 1,505 km^{2} (581 sq mi)
- Elevation: 235 m (771 ft)

Population (2018)
  - Total: 15,197
  - Density: 7.75/km^{2} (20.1/sq mi)
  - Ethnicities: Antandroy Bara Antanosy
- Time zone: UTC3 (EAT)
- Postal code: 603

Mahaly is a rural commune in Madagascar. It belongs to the district of Amboasary Sud, which is a part of Anosy Region. The population of the commune was estimated 15197 in 2018. It is situated at 45 km from Tsivory.

== Agriculture ==
Rice, manioc, corn, peanuts, vegetables and zebu breeding are the principal agricultural activities.

== Ethnics ==
Antandroy, Bara and Antanosy are the main people.

== Rivers ==
Mandrare River, Manambolo River, Voronkatsa, Sahanony, Mangotro, Antalimanga, Betatatsy and Ambia.

== References and notes ==
- PIMENTS « PILO KELY » DANS LES COMMUNES RURALES DE TSIVORY
