= Amboasary Sud District =

Amboasary Sud District Amboasary Atsimo District
- Location in Madagascar
- Coordinates: 25°3′S 46°23′E
- Country: Madagascar
- Region: Anosy
- District: Amboasary Sud

Area
  - Total: 9,889 km^{2} (3,818 sq mi)
- Elevation: 26 m (85 ft)

Population (2020)
  - Total: 275,397
  - Density: 27.85/km^{2} (72.13/sq mi)
- Time zone: UTC3 (EAT)
- Postal code: 603

Amboasary Sud (Amboasary Atsimo) is a district located in Anosy Region, Madagascar. It has a population of 275,397 in 2020.

== Geography ==
It is located at the Mandrare River, approximately 75 km from Fort-Dauphin and 35 km from Ambovombe.

== Economy ==
The economy of the town is dominated by sisal plantations and 3 transforming companies.

== Points of interest ==
- The privately owned Berenty Reserve is close to Amboasary.
- Bay of Italy (Italy significates Where there is the wind in Malgache language)
- Anony Lake with its flamingoes and the caves called Jurassique Cirque (Jurassic Circus).

== Communes ==
The district is further divided into 17 communes:

- Amboasary Sud
- Behara
- Berano Ville
- Ebelo
- Elonty
- Esira
- Ifotaka
- Mahabo
- Mahaly
- Manevy
- Maromby
- Marotsiraka
- Sampona
- Ranobe
- Tanandava Sud
- Tranomaro
- Tomboarivo
- Tsivory

== Protected areas ==
- Berenty Reserve
