= Lukanga =

Lukanga may refer to:

- Lukanga Swamp, a major wetland in Zambia
- Lokanga bara, a type of fiddle native to Madagascar
- Lukanga (name), a first name in parts of Central Africa
