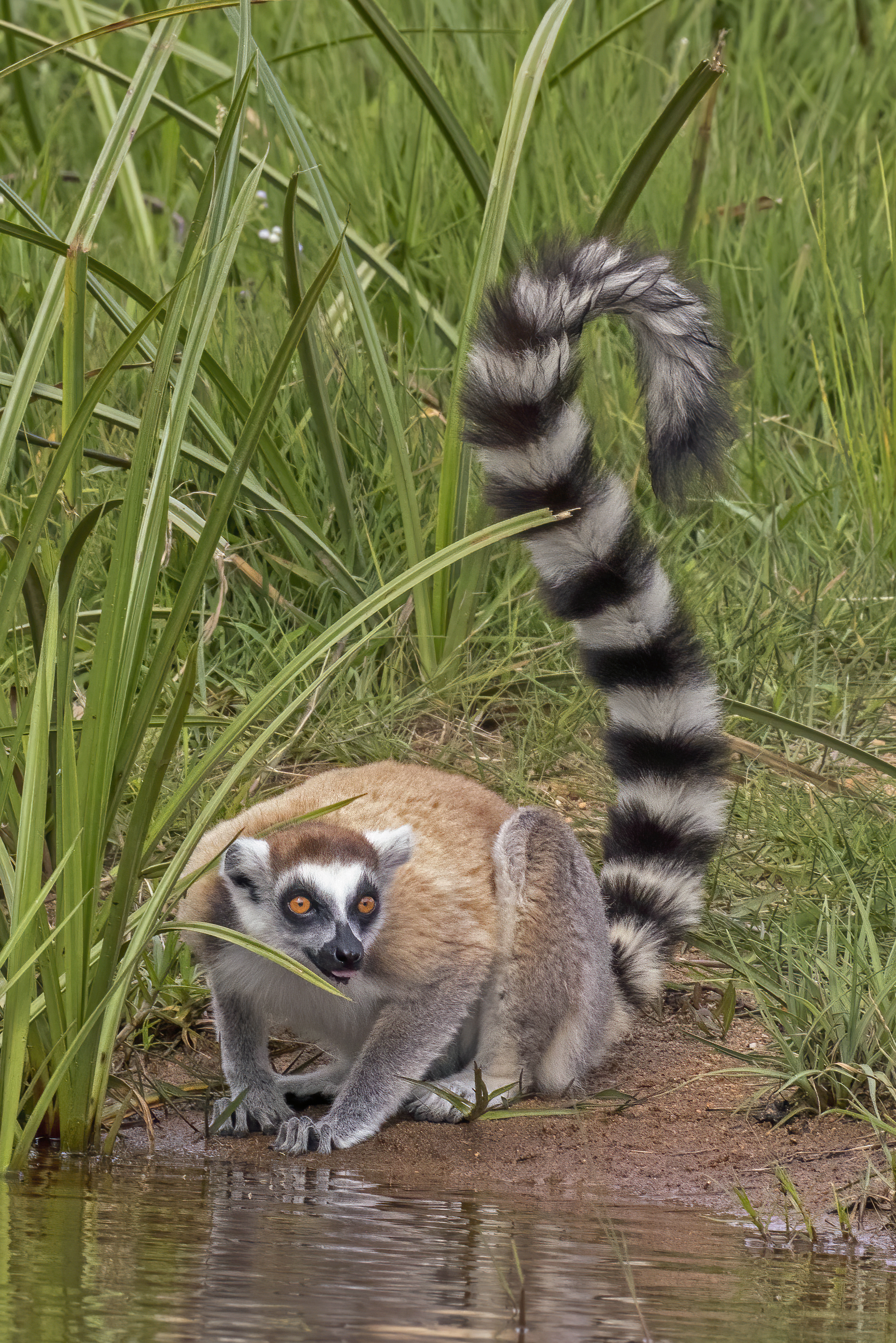

Conservation status
- Endangered (IUCN 3.1)
- CITES Appendix I

Scientific classification
- Kingdom: Animalia
- Phylum: Chordata
- Class: Mammalia
- Order: Primates
- Suborder: Strepsirrhini
- Family: Lemuridae
- Genus: Lemur; Linnaeus, 1758
- Species: L. catta

Binomial name
- Lemur catta Linnaeus, 1758
- native range

Synonyms
- Genus: Prosimia Brisson, 1762 (Note: The genus name Prosimia was declared unavailable by the International Commission on Zoological Nomenclature in 1998.); Procebus Storr, 1780; Catta Link, 1806 (Note: Type species was designated as Catta mococo (= Lemur catta Linnaeus, 1758).); Maki Muirhead, 1819 (Note: Type species was designated as Maki mococo (= Lemur catta Linnaeus, 1758).); Mococo Trouessart, 1878 (Note: The synonym Mococo is sometimes omitted because it was technically a vernacular term for the genus Prosimia. René Primevère Lesson named the type species for this genus as Prosimia catta (= Lemur catta Linnaeus, 1758) in the same year (1878).); Odorlemur Bolwig, 1960; Species: Maki mococo Muirhead, 1819 (Note: Muirhead (1819) credited the name Maki mococo to Anselme Gaëtan Desmarest (1817), although it was actually used as a vernacular name.)

= Ring-tailed lemur =

Species of mammal from Madagascar

The ring-tailed lemur (Lemur catta) is a medium- to larger-sized strepsirrhine (wet-nosed) primate and the most internationally recognized lemur species, owing to its long, black-and-white, ringed tail. It belongs to Lemuridae, one of five lemur families, and is the only member of the Lemur genus. Like all lemurs, it is endemic to the island of Madagascar, where it is endangered. Known locally in Malagasy as maky ([makʲ], spelled maki in French) or hira, it ranges from gallery forests to spiny scrub in the southern regions of the island. It is omnivorous, as well as the most adapted to living terrestrially of the extant lemurs.

The ring-tailed lemur is highly social, living in groups—known as "troops"—of up to 30 individuals. It is also a female-dominant species, a commonality among lemurs. To keep warm and reaffirm social bonds, groups will huddle together. Mutual grooming is another vital aspect of lemur socialization (as with all primates), reaffirming social and familial connections, while also helping rid each other of any potential insects. Ring-tailed lemurs are strictly diurnal, being active exclusively during daylight hours. Due to this lifestyle, they also sunbathe; the lemurs can be observed sitting upright on their tails, exposing their soft, white belly fur towards the sun. They will often also have their palms open and eyes gently closed. Like other lemurs, this species relies strongly on their sense of smell, and territorial marking, with scent glands, provides communication signals throughout a group's home range. The glands are located near the eyes, as well as near the anus. The males perform a unique scent-marking behavior called spur-marking and will participate in stink fights by dousing their tails with their pheromones and "wafting" them at opponents. Additionally, lemurs of both sexes will scent-mark trees, logs, rocks or other objects by simply rubbing their faces and bodies onto it, not unlike a domestic cat.

As one of the most vocal primates, the ring-tailed lemur uses numerous vocalizations, including calling for group cohesion and predator alarm calls. Experiments have shown that the ring-tailed lemur, despite the lack of a large brain (relative to simiiform primates), can organize sequences, understand basic arithmetic operations, and preferentially select tools based on functional qualities.

Despite adapting to and breeding easily under captive care (and being the most popular species of lemur in zoos worldwide, with more than 2,000 captive-raised individuals), the wild population of ring-tailed lemur is listed as endangered by the IUCN Red List, due to habitat destruction, local hunting for bushmeat and the exotic pet trade. As of early 2017, the population in the wild is believed to have lowered to as few as 2,000 individuals due to these reasons, making them far more critically endangered. Local Malagasy farmers and logging industries frequently make use of slash and burn deforestation techniques, with smoke being visible on the horizon on most days in Madagascar, in an effort to accommodate livestock and to cultivate larger fields of crops.

== Etymology ==
Although the term "lemur" was first intended for slender lorises, it was soon limited to the endemic Malagasy primates, which have been known as "lemurs" ever since. The name derives from the Latin term lemures, which refers to specters or ghosts that were exorcised during the Lemuria festival of ancient Rome. According to Carl Linnaeus's own explanation, the name was selected because of the nocturnal activity and slow movements of the slender loris. Being familiar with the works of Virgil and Ovid and seeing an analogy that fit with his naming scheme, Linnaeus adapted the term "lemur" for these nocturnal primates. However, it has been commonly and falsely assumed that Linnaeus was referring to the ghost-like appearance, reflective eyes, and ghostly cries of lemurs. It has also been speculated that Linnaeus may also have known that some Malagasy people have held legends that lemurs are the souls of their ancestors, but this is unlikely given that the name was selected for slender lorises from India. The species name, catta, refers to the ring-tailed lemur's cat-like appearance. Its purring vocalization is similar to that of the domestic cat.

Following Linnaeus's species description, the common name "ring-tailed maucauco" was first penned in 1771 by Welsh naturalist Thomas Pennant, who noted its characteristic long, banded tail. (The term "maucauco" was a very common term for lemurs at this time.) The now universal English name "ring-tailed lemur" was first used by George Shaw in his illustrated scientific publication covering the Leverian collection, which was published between 1792 and 1796.

== Evolutionary history ==
All mammalian fossils from Madagascar come from recent times. Thus, little is known about the evolution of the ring-tailed lemur, let alone the rest of the lemur clade, which comprises the entire endemic primate population of the island. However, chromosomal and molecular evidence suggest that lemurs are more closely related to each other than to other strepsirrhine primates. For this to have happened, it is thought that a very small ancestral population came to Madagascar via a single rafting event between 50 and 80 million years ago. Subsequent evolutionary radiation and speciation has created the diversity of Malagasy lemurs seen today.

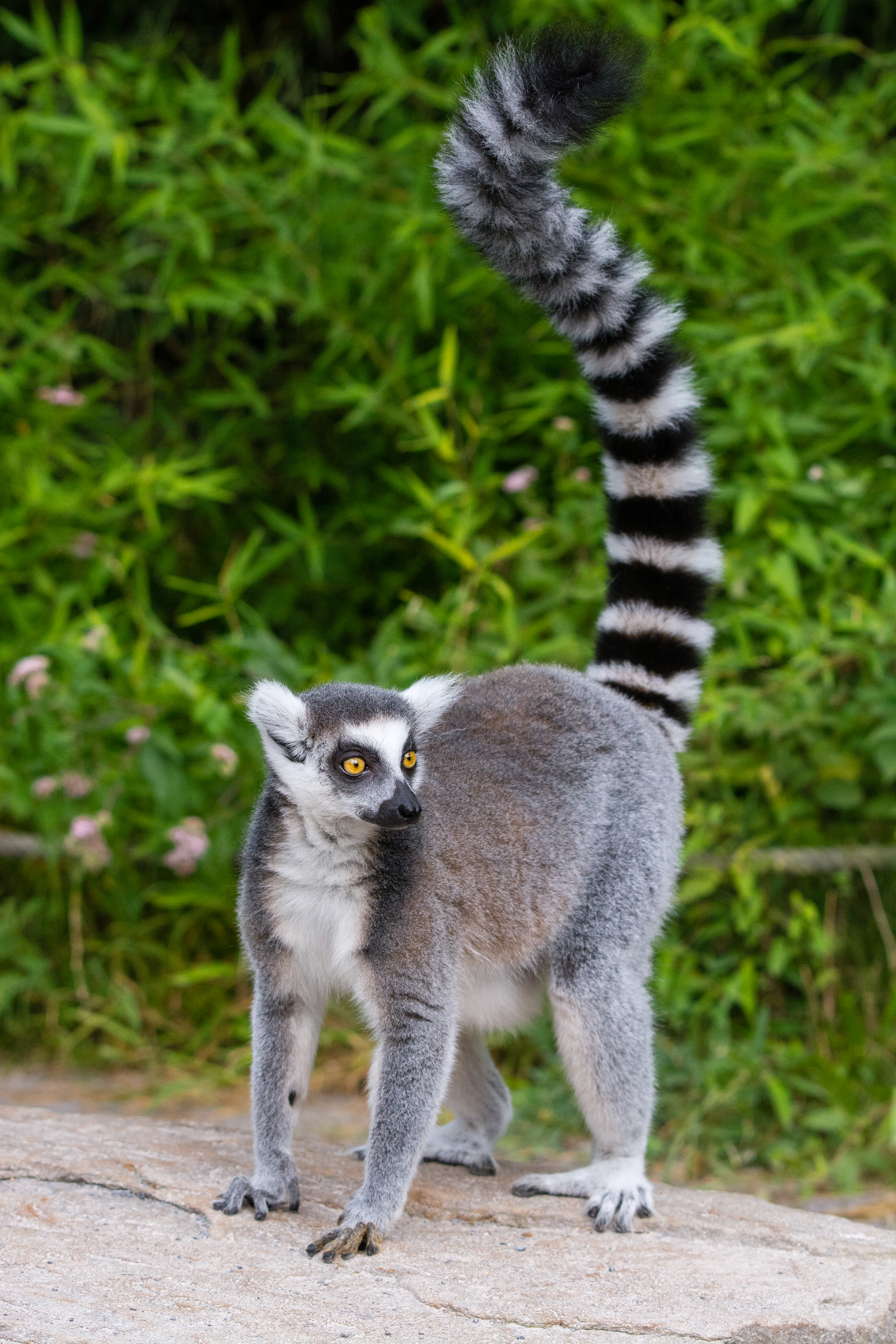
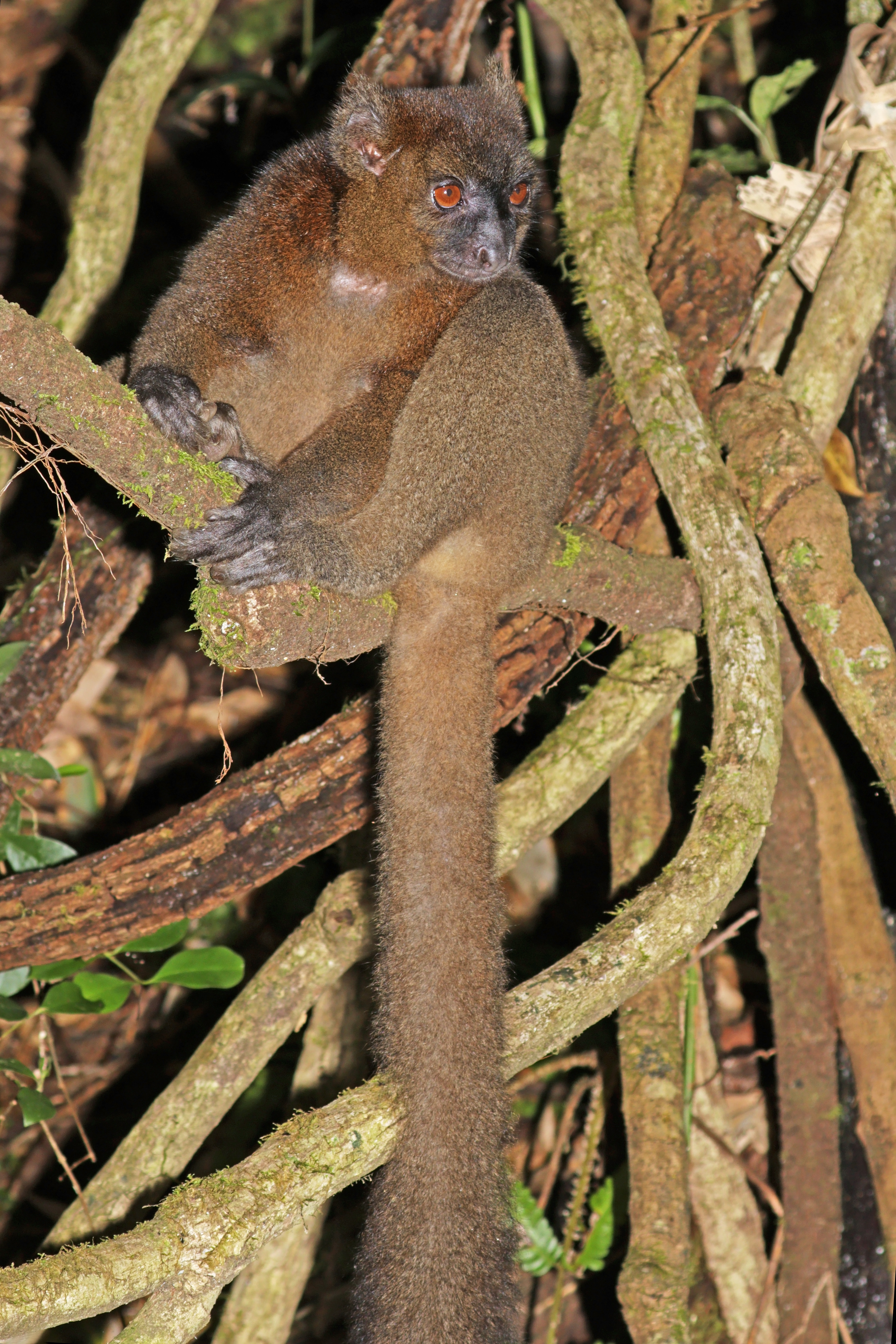
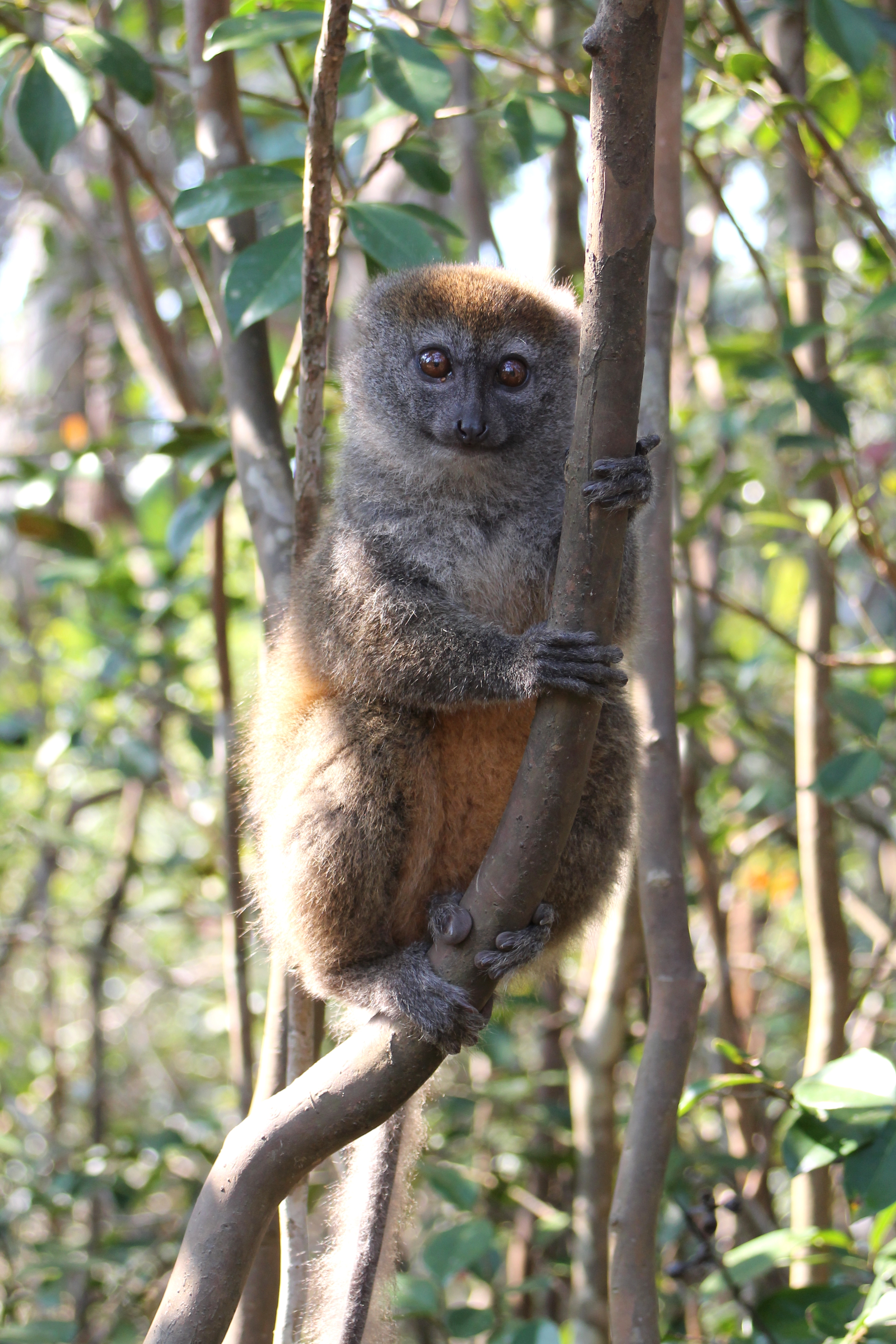
Genetic analysis indicates that ring-tailed lemurs (left) are more closely related to the two genera of bamboo lemurs (Prolemur [center] and Hapalemur [right]) than they are to other members of the family Lemuridae.

According to analysis of amino acid sequences, the branching of the family Lemuridae has been dated to 26.1 ±3.3 mya while rRNA sequences of mtDNA place the split at 24.9 ±3.6 mya. The ruffed lemurs are the first genus to split away (most basal) in the family, a view that is further supported by analysis of DNA sequences and karyotypes. Additionally, Molecular data suggests a deep genetic divergence and sister group relationship between the true lemurs (Eulemur) and the other two genera: Lemur and Hapalemur.

The ring-tailed lemur is thought to share closer affinities to the bamboo lemurs of the genus Hapalemur than to the other two genera in its family. This has been supported by comparisons in communication, chromosomes, genetics, and several morphological traits, such as scent gland similarities. However, other data concerning immunology and other morphological traits fail to support this close relationship. For example, Hapalemur species have short snouts, while the ring-tailed lemur and the rest of Lemuridae have long snouts. However, differences in the relationship between the orbit (eye socket) and the muzzle suggest that the ring-tailed lemur and the true lemurs evolved their elongated faces independently.

The relationship between the ring-tailed lemur and bamboo lemurs is least understood. Molecular analysis suggests that either the bamboo lemurs diverged from the ring-tailed lemur, making the group monophyletic and supporting the current two-genera taxonomy, or that the ring-tailed lemur is nested in with the bamboo lemurs, requiring Hapalemur simus to be split off into its own genus, Prolemur.

The karyotype of the ring-tailed lemur has 56 chromosomes, of which four are metacentric (arms of nearly equal length), four are submetacentric (arms of unequal length), and 46 are acrocentric (the short arm is hardly observable). The X chromosome is metacentric and the Y chromosome is acrocentric.

=== Taxonomic classification ===
Linnaeus first used the genus name Lemur to describe "Lemur tardigradus" (the red slender loris, now known as Loris tardigradus) in his 1754 catalog of the Museum of King Adolf Frederick. In 1758, his 10th edition of Systema Naturae listed the genus Lemur with three included species, only one of which is still considered to be a lemur while another is no longer considered to be a primate. These species include: Lemur tardigradus, Lemur catta (the ring-tailed lemur), and Lemur volans (the Philippine colugo, now known as Cynocephalus volans). In 1911, Oldfield Thomas made Lemur catta the type species for the genus, despite the term initially being used to describe lorises. On January 10, 1929, the International Commission on Zoological Nomenclature (ICZN) formalized this decision in its publication of Opinion 122.

The ring-tailed lemur shares many similarities with ruffed lemurs (genus Varecia) and true lemurs (genus Eulemur), and its skeleton is nearly indistinguishable from that of the true lemurs. Consequently, the three genera were once grouped together in the genus Lemur and more recently are sometimes referred to as subfamily Lemurinae (within family Lemuridae). However, ruffed lemurs were reassigned to the genus Varecia in 1962, and due to similarities between the ring-tailed lemur and the bamboo lemurs, particularly in regards to molecular evidence and scent glands similarities, the true lemurs were moved to the genus Eulemur by Yves Rumpler and Elwyn L. Simons (1988) as well as Colin Groves and Robert H. Eaglen (1988). In 1991, Ian Tattersall and Jeffrey H. Schwartz reviewed the evidence and came to a different conclusion, instead favoring to return the members of Eulemur and Varecia to the genus Lemur. However, this view was not widely accepted and the genus Lemur remained monotypic, containing only the ring-tailed lemur. Because the differences in molecular data are so minute between the ring-tailed lemur and both genera of bamboo lemurs, it has been suggested that all three genera be merged.

Because of the difficulty in discerning the relationships within family Lemuridae, not all authorities agree on the taxonomy, although the majority of the primatological community favors the current classification.

Taxonomy of family Lemuridae
- Family Lemuridae
  - Genus Lemur: the ring-tailed lemur
  - Genus Eulemur: brown lemurs
  - Genus Varecia: ruffed lemurs
  - Genus Hapalemur: lesser gentle or bamboo lemurs
  - Genus Prolemur: the greater bamboo lemur
Phylogeny of family Lemuridae

- Lemuridae
  - Varecia (ruffed lemurs)
  - - - - Lemur (ring-tailed lemur)
        - Hapalemur (lesser bamboo lemurs)
      - Eulemur (true lemurs)

In 1996, researchers Steven Goodman and Olivier Langrand suggested that the ring-tailed lemur may demonstrate regional variations, particularly a high mountain population at Andringitra Massif that has a thicker coat, lighter coloration, and variations in its tail rings. In 2001, primatologist Colin Groves concluded that this does not represent a locally occurring subspecies. This decision was later supported by further fieldwork that showed that the differences fell within the normal range of variation for the species. The thicker coat was considered a local adaptation to extreme low temperatures in the region, and the fading of the fur was attributed to increased exposure to solar radiation. Additional genetic studies in 2000 further supported the conclusion that population did not vary significantly from the other ring-tailed lemur populations on the island.

== Anatomy and physiology ==
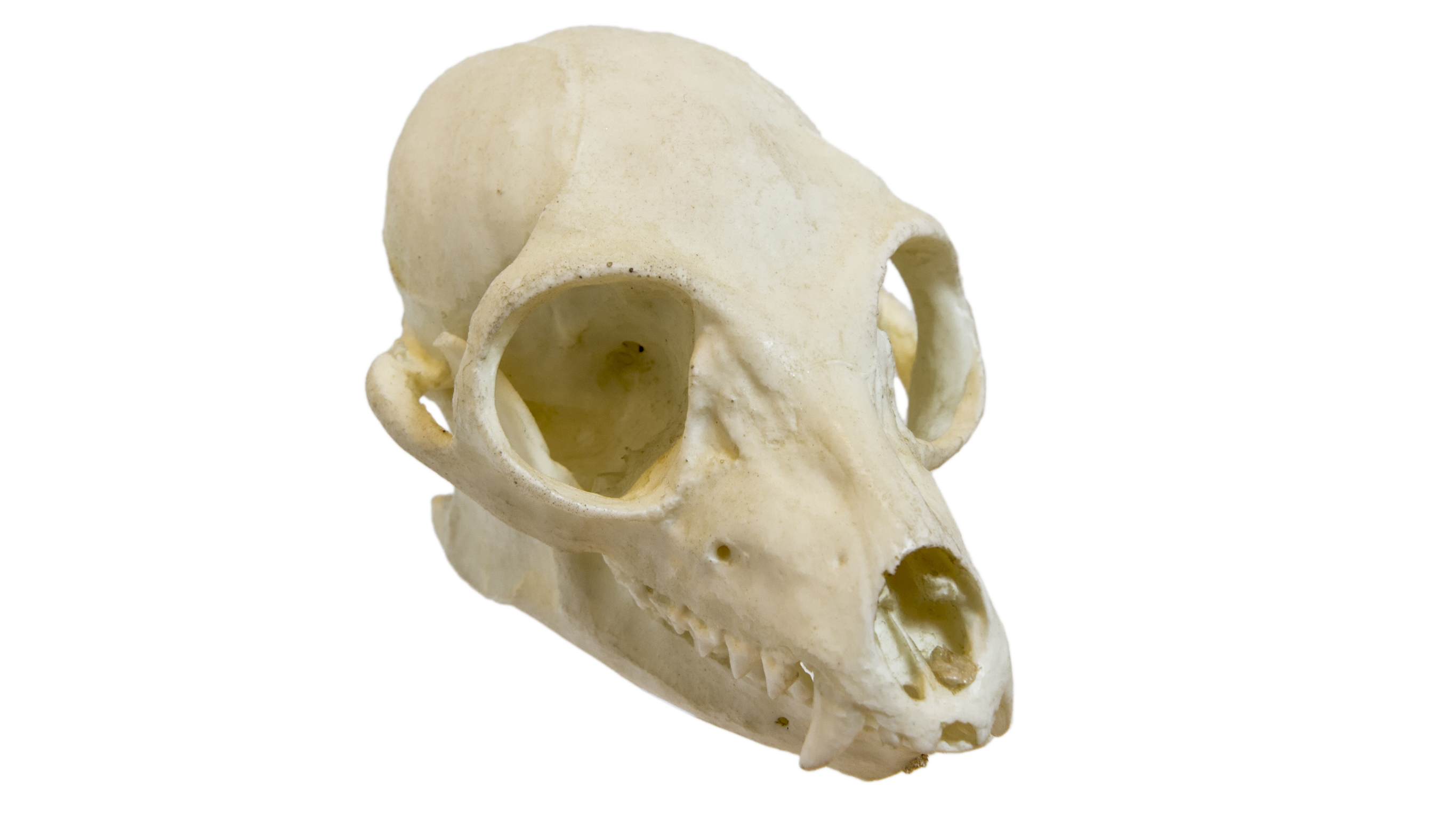
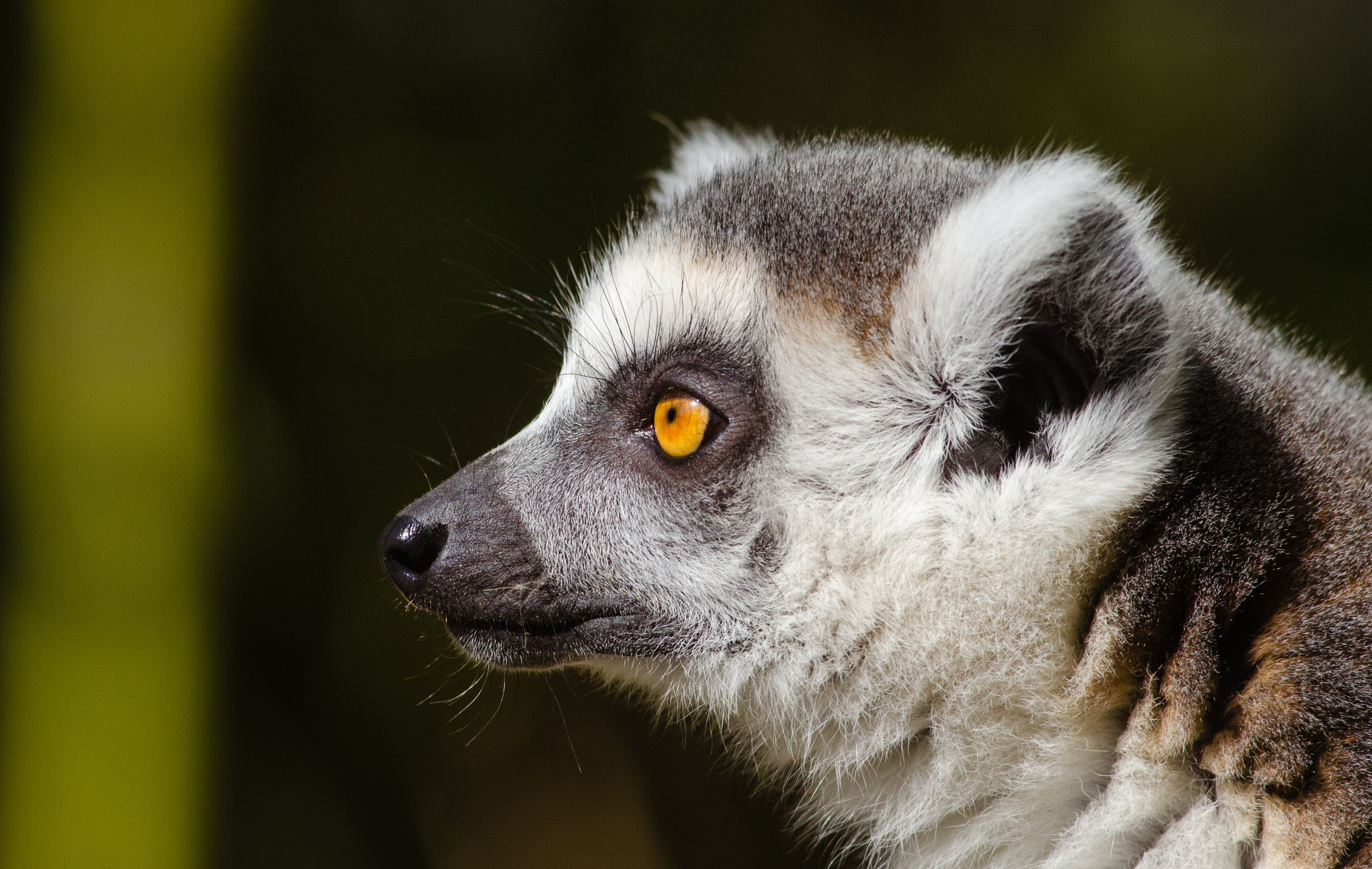
The ring-tailed lemur is a strepsirrhine primate, with a protruding muzzle and a wet nose. Top is the skull.

The ring-tailed lemur is a relatively large lemur. Its average weight is 2.2 kilograms (4.9 lb). Its head–body length ranges between 39 and 46 cm (15 and 18 in), its tail length is 56 and 63 cm (22 and 25 in), and its total length is 95 and 110 cm (37 and 43 in). Other measurements include a hind foot length of 102 and 113 mm (4.0 and 4.4 in), ear length of 40 and 48 mm (1.6 and 1.9 in), and cranium length of 78 and 88 mm (3.1 and 3.5 in).

The species has a slender frame and narrow face, fox-like muzzle. The ring-tailed lemur's trademark—a long, bushy tail—is ringed in alternating black and white transverse bands, numbering 12 or 13 white rings and 13 or 14 black rings and always ending in a black tip. The total number of rings nearly matches the approximate number of caudal vertebrae (~25). Its tail is longer than its body and is not prehensile. Instead, it is only used for balance, communication, and group cohesion.

The pelage (fur) is so dense that it can clog electric clippers. The ventral (chest) coat and throat are white or cream. The dorsal (back) coat varies from gray to rosy-brown, sometimes with a brown pygal patch around the tail region, where the fur grades to pale gray or grayish brown. The dorsal coloration is slightly darker around the neck and crown. The hair on the throat, cheeks, and ears is white or off-white and also less dense, allowing the dark skin underneath to show through. The muzzle is dark grayish and the nose is black, and the eyes are encompassed by black triangular patches. Facial vibrissae (whiskers) are developed and found above the lips (mystacal), on the cheeks (genal), and on the eyebrow (superciliary). Vibrissae are also found slightly above the wrist on the underside of the forearm. The ears are relatively large compared to other lemurs and are covered in hair, which has only small tufts if any. Although slight pattern variations in the facial region may be seen between individuals, there are no obvious differences between the sexes.

Unlike most diurnal primates, but like all strepsirrhine primates, the ring-tailed lemur has a tapetum lucidum, or reflective layer behind the retina of the eye, that enhances night vision. The tapetum is highly visible in this species because the pigmentation of the ocular fundus (back surface of the eye), which is present in—but varies between—all lemurs, is very spotty. The ring-tailed lemur also has a rudimentary foveal depression on the retina. Another shared characteristic with the other strepsirrhine primates is the rhinarium, a moist, naked, glandular nose supported by the upper jaw and protruding beyond the chin. The rhinarium continues down where it divides the upper lip. The upper lip is attached to the premaxilla, preventing the lip from protruding and thus requiring the lemur to lap water rather than using suction.

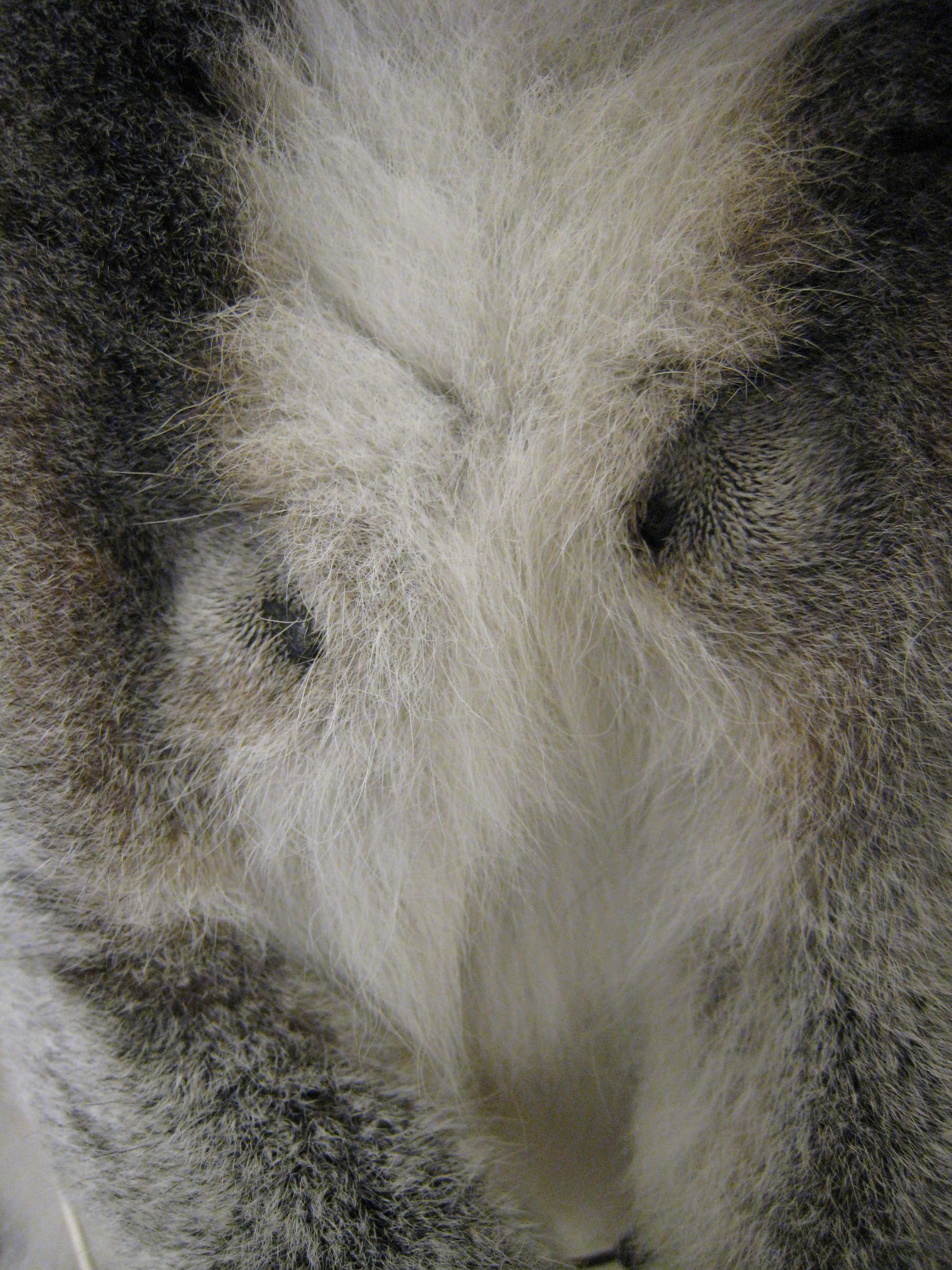
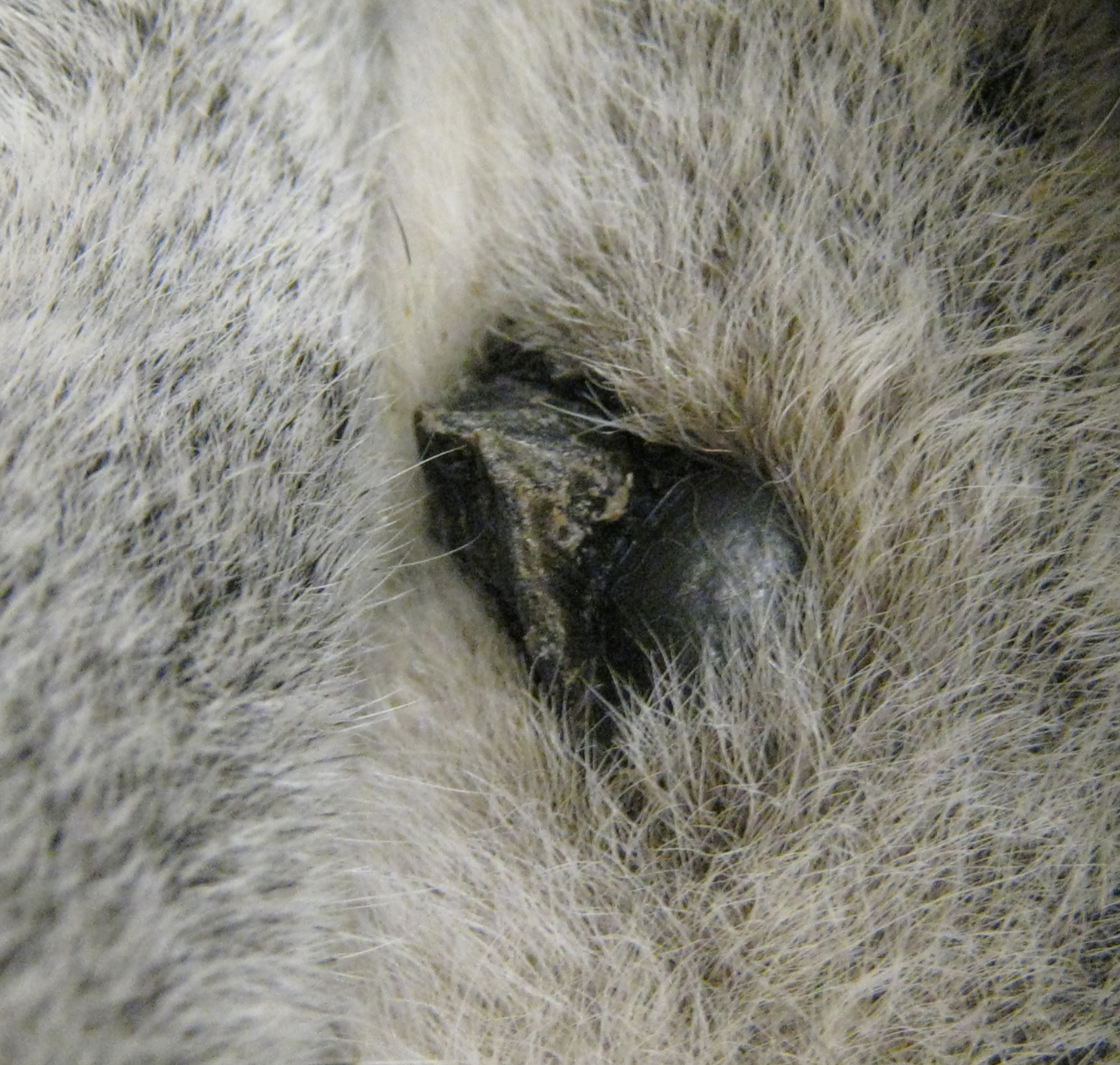
Scent glands on a male: the brachial glands on the upper chest (left), and antebrachial gland and spur on the forearm (right)

The skin of the ring-tailed lemur is dark gray or black in color, even in places where the fur is white. It is exposed on the nose, palms, soles, eyelids, lips, and genitalia. The skin is smooth, but the leathery texture of the hands and feet facilitate terrestrial movement. The anus, located at the joint of the tail, is covered when the tail is lowered. The area around the anus (circumanal area) and the perineum are covered in fur. In males, the scrotum lacks fur, is covered in small, horny spines, and the two sacs of the scrotum are divided. The penis is nearly cylindrical in shape and is covered in small spines, as well as having two pairs of larger spines on both sides. Males have a relatively small baculum (penis bone) compared to their size. The scrotum, penis, and prepuce are usually coated with a foul-smelling secretion. Females have a vulva with a thick, elongated clitoris that protrudes from the labia. The opening of the urethra is closer to the clitoris than the vagina, forming a "drip tip".

Females have two pairs of mammary glands (four nipples), but only one pair is functional. The anterior pair (closest to the head) are very close to the axillae (armpit). Furless scent glands are present on both males and females. Both sexes have small, dark antebrachial (forearm) glands measuring 1 cm long and located on the inner surface of the forearm nearly 25 cm (9.8 in) above the wrist joint. (This trait is shared between the Lemur and Hapalemur genera.) The gland is soft and compressible, bears fine dermal ridges (like fingerprints), and is connected to the palm by a fine, 2 mm–high, hairless strip. However, only the male has a horny spur that overlays this scent gland. The spur develops with age through the accumulation of secretions from an underlying gland that may connect through the skin through as many as a thousand minuscule ducts. The males also have brachial (arm) glands on the axillary surface of their shoulders (near the armpit). The brachial gland is larger than the antebrachial gland, covered in short hair around the periphery, and has a naked crescent-shaped orifice near the center. The gland secretes a foul-smelling, brown, sticky substance. The brachial gland is barely developed if present at all in females. Both sexes also have apocrine and sebaceous glands in their genital or perianal regions, which are covered in fur.

Its fingers are slender, padded, mostly lacking webbing, and semi-dexterous with flat, human-like nails. The thumb is both short and widely separated from the other fingers. Despite being set at a right angle to the palm, the thumb is not opposable since the ball of the joint is fixed in place. As with all strepsirrhines, the hand is ectaxonic (the axis passes through the fourth digit) rather than mesaxonic (the axis passing through the third digit) as seen in monkeys and apes. The fourth digit is the longest, and only slightly longer than the second digit. Likewise, the fifth digit is only slightly longer than the second. The palms are long and leathery, and like other primates, they have dermal ridges to improve grip. The feet are semi-digitigrade and more specialized than the hands. The big toe is opposable and is smaller than the big toe of other lemurs, which are more arboreal. The second toe is short, has a small terminal pad, and has a toilet-claw (sometimes referred to as a grooming claw) specialized for personal grooming, specifically to rake through fur that is unreachable by the mouth. The toilet-claw is a trait shared among nearly all living strepsirrhine primates. Unlike other lemurs, the ring-tailed lemur's heel is not covered by fur.

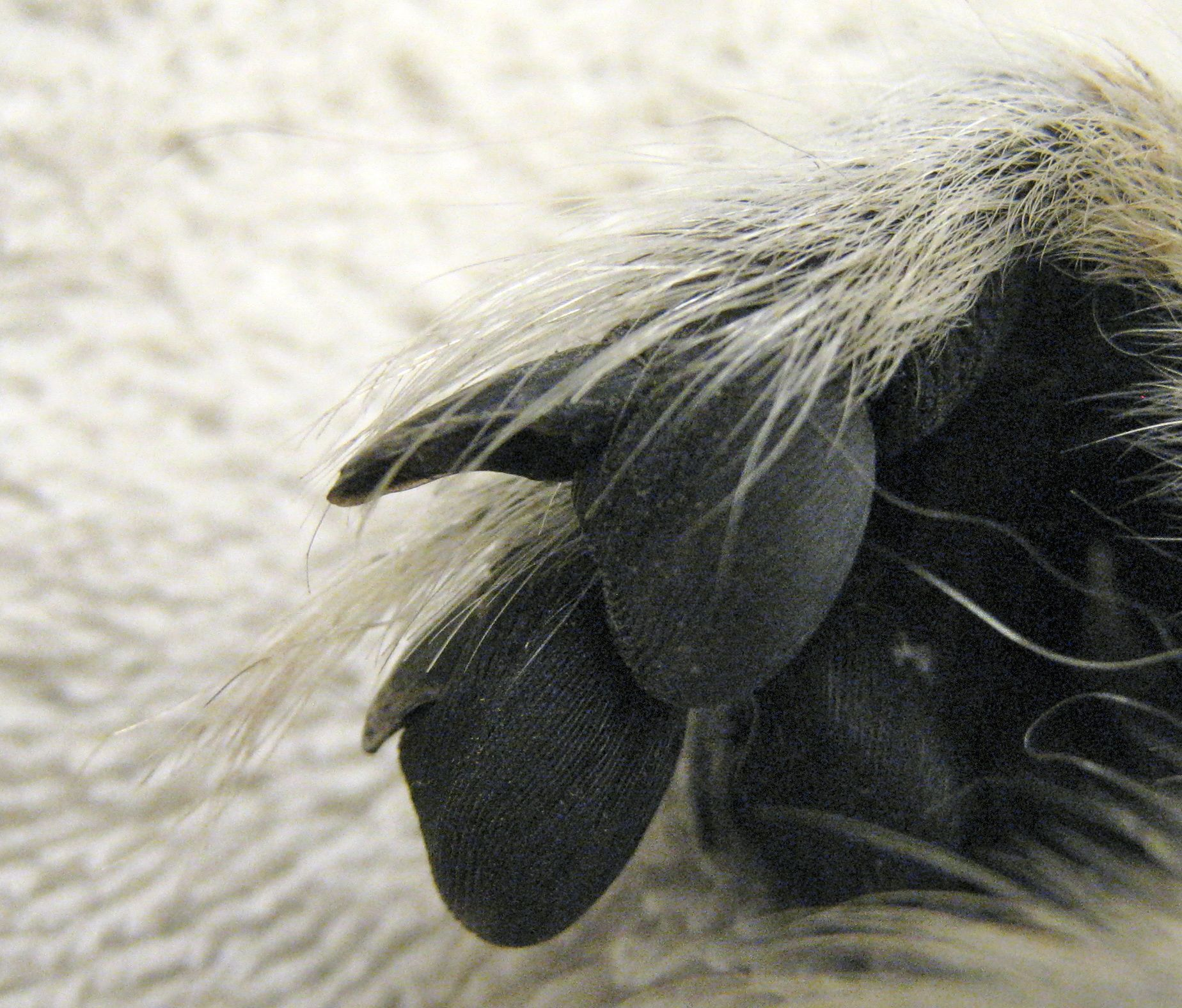
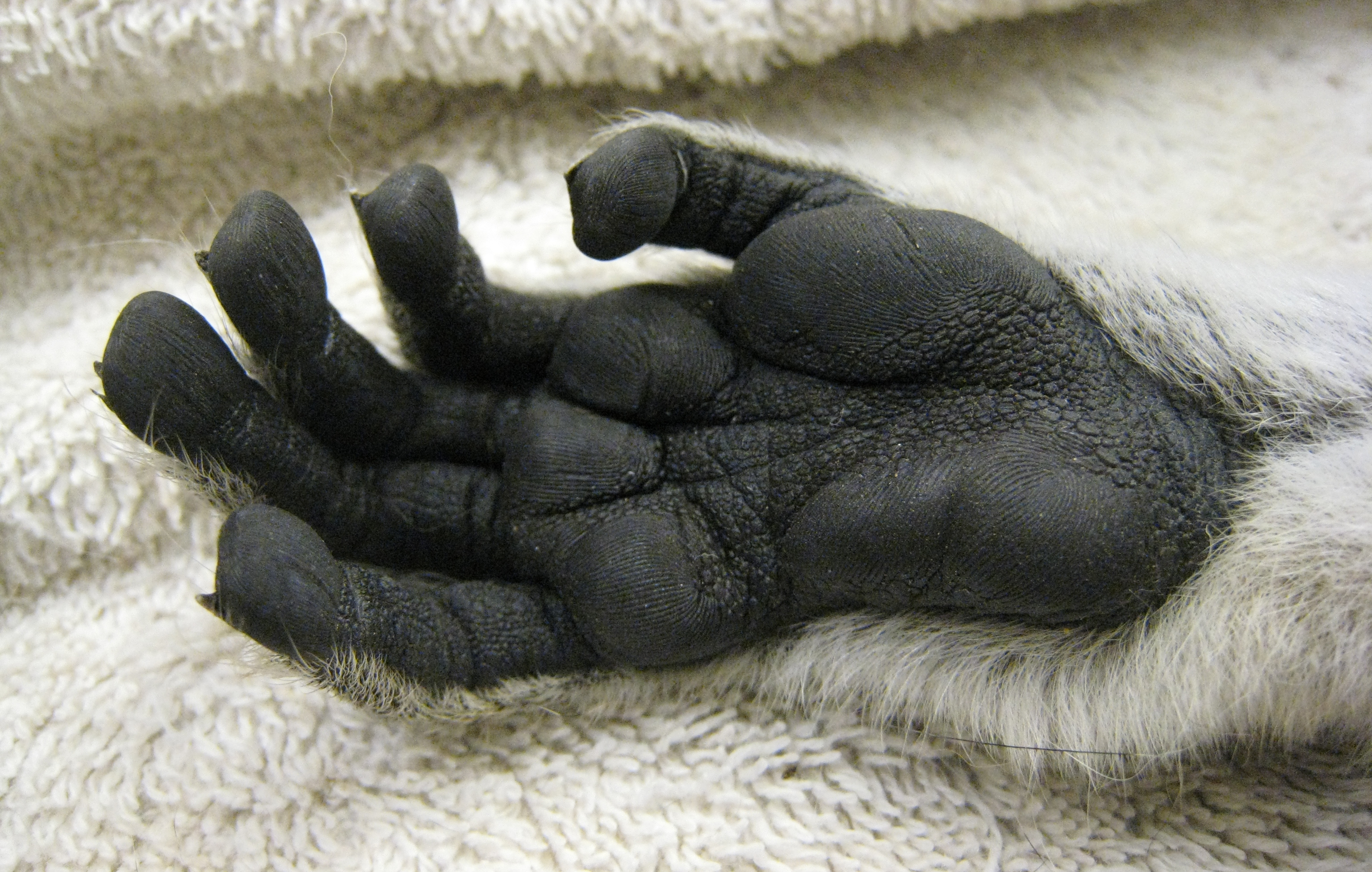
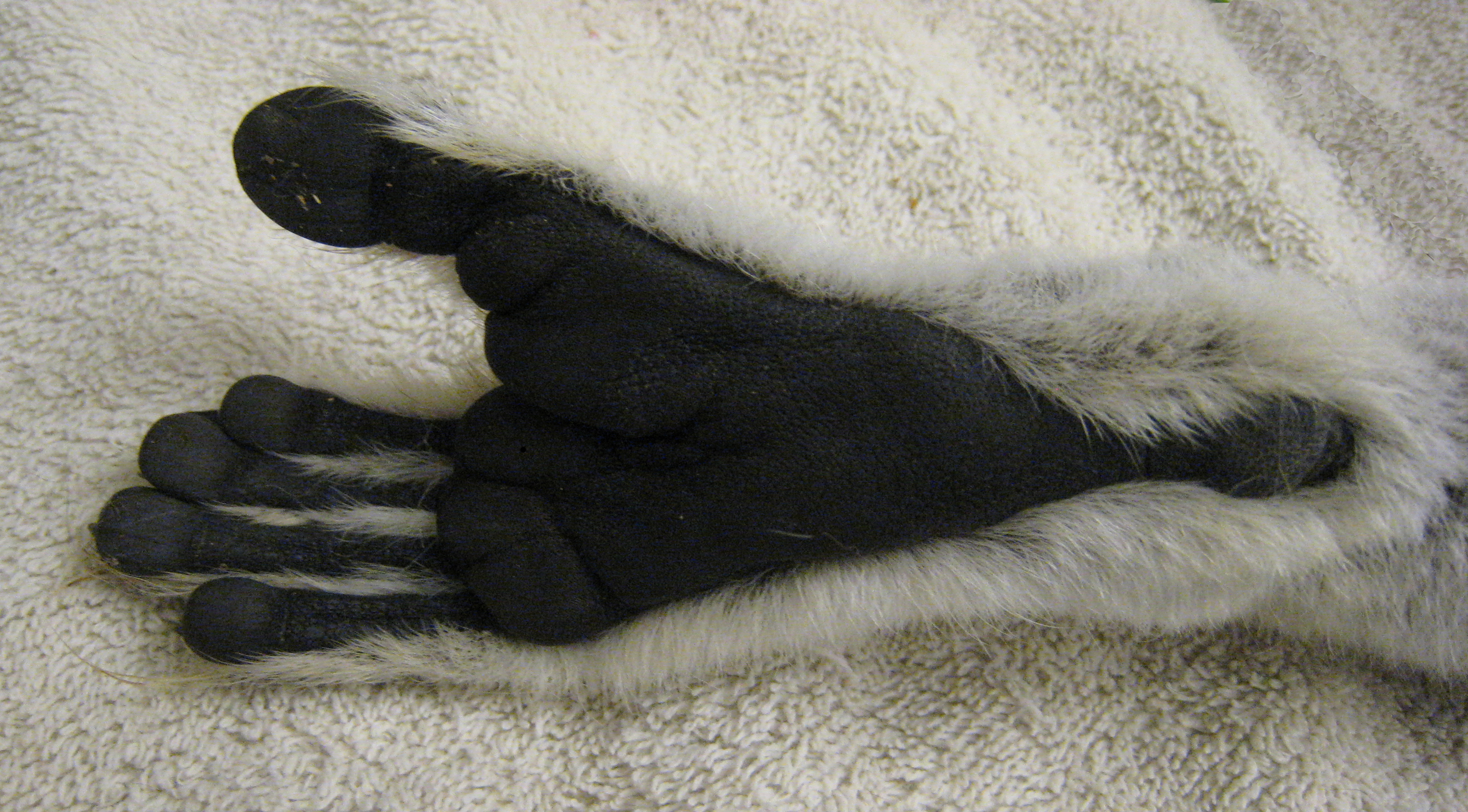
Like other lemurs, the ring-tailed lemur has a claw-like nail (toilet-claw) on its second toe (left) and dermal ridges on its hands to improve its grip (center). Unlike other lemurs, it lacks fur on its heel (right).

=== Dentition ===
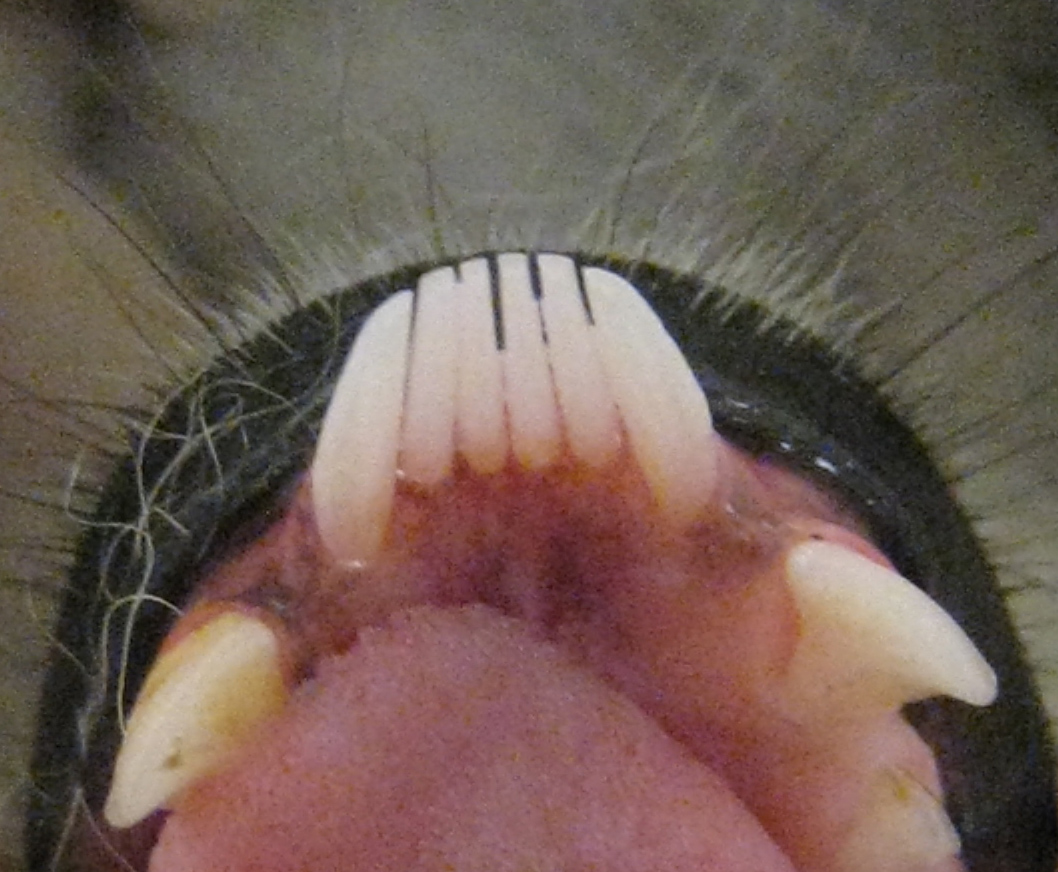
The front, lower dentition includes a toothcomb (4 incisors and 2 canine teeth), while the first premolars resemble canines.

The ring-tailed lemur has a dentition of 2.1.3.32.1.3.3 × 2 = 36, meaning that on each side of the jaw it has two incisors, one canine tooth, three premolars, and three molar teeth. Its deciduous dentition is 2.1.32.1.3 × 2 = 24. The permanent teeth erupt in the following order: m 1/1 (first molars), i 2/2 (first incisors), i 3/3 (second incisors), C1 (upper canines), m 2/2 (second molars), c1 (lower canines), m 3/3 (third molars), p 4/4 (third premolars), p 3/3 (second premolars), p 2/2 (first premolars).

Its lower incisors (i1 and i2) are long, narrow, and finely spaced while pointing almost straight forward in the mouth (procumbent). Together with the incisor-shaped (incisiform) lower canines (c1), which are slightly larger and also procumbent, form a structure called a toothcomb, a trait unique to nearly all strepsirrhine primates. The toothcomb is used during oral grooming, which involves licking and tooth-scraping. It may also be used for grasping small fruits, removing leaves from the stem when eating, and possibly scraping sap and gum from tree bark. The toothcomb is kept clean using a sublingual organ—a thin, flat, fibrous plate that covers a large part of the base of the tongue. The first lower premolar (p2) following the toothcomb is shaped like a canine (caniniform) and occludes the upper canine, essentially filling the role of the incisiform lower canine. There is also a diastema (gap) between the second and third premolars (p2 and p3).

The upper incisors are small, with the first incisors (I1) space widely from each other, yet closely to the second incisors (I2). Both are compressed buccolingually (between the cheek and the tongue). The upper canines (C1) are long, have a broad base, and curve down and back (recurved). The upper canines exhibit slight sexual dimorphism, with males exhibiting slightly larger canines than females. Both sexes use them in combat by slashing with them. There is a small diastema between the upper canine and the first premolar (P2), which is smaller and more caniniform than the other premolars. Unlike other lemurs, the first two upper molars (M1 and M2) have prominent lingual cingulae, yet do not have a protostyle.

== Ecology ==
The ring-tailed lemur is diurnal and semi-terrestrial. It is the most terrestrial of lemur species, spending as much as 33% of its time on the ground. However it is still considerably arboreal, spending 23% of its time in the mid-level canopy, 25% in the upper-level canopy, 6% in the emergent layer and 13% in small bushes. Troop travel is 70% terrestrial.

Troop size, home range, and population density vary by region and food availability. Troops typically range in size from 6 to 25, although troops with over 30 individuals have been recorded. The average troop contains 13 to 15 individuals. Home range size varies between 6 and 35 hectares (15 and 86 acres). Troops of the ring-tailed lemur will maintain a territory, but overlap is often high. When encounters occur, they are agonistic, or hostile in nature. A troop will usually occupy the same part of its range for three or four days before moving. When it does move, the average traveling distance is 1 km (0.62 mi). Population density ranges from 100 individuals per 1 km^{2} (0.39 sq mi) in dry forests to 250–600 individuals per km^{2} in gallery and secondary forests.

The ring-tailed lemur has both native and introduced predators. Native predators include the fossa (Cryptoprocta ferox), the Madagascar harrier-hawk (Polyboroides radiatus), the Madagascar buzzard (Buteo brachypterus) and the Madagascar ground boa (Acrantophis madagascariensis). Introduced predators include the small Indian civet (Viverricula indica), the domestic cat and the domestic dog. Other predators include black kites and Malagasy giant hognose snakes.

=== Geographic range and habitat ===
Endemic to southern and southwestern Madagascar, the ring-tailed lemur ranges further into highland areas than other lemurs. It inhabits deciduous forests, dry scrub, montane humid forests, and gallery forests (forests along riverbanks). It strongly favors gallery forests, but such forests have now been cleared from much of Madagascar in order to create pasture for livestock. Depending on location, temperatures within its geographic range can vary from −12 °C (10 °F) at Andringitra Massif to 48 °C (118 °F) in the spiny forests of Beza Mahafaly Special Reserve.

This species is found as far east as Tôlanaro, inland towards the mountains of Andringitra on the southeastern plateau, among the spiny forests of the southern part of the island, and north along the west coast to the town of Belo sur Mer. Historically, the northern limits of its range in the west extended to the Morondava River near Morondava. It can still be found in Kirindy Mitea National Park, just south of Morondava, though at very low densities. It does not occur in Kirindy Forest Reserve, north of Morondava. Its distribution throughout the rest of its range is very spotty, with population densities varying widely.

The ring-tailed lemur can be easily seen in five national parks in Madagascar: Andohahela National Park, Andringitra National Park, Isalo National Park, Tsimanampetsotse National Park, and Zombitse-Vohibasia National Park. It can also be found in Beza-Mahafaly Special Reserve, Kalambatritra Special Reserve, Pic d'Ivohibe Special Reserve, Amboasary Sud, Berenty Private Reserve, Anja Community Reserve, and marginally at Kirindy Mitea National Park. Unprotected forests that the species has been reported in include Ankoba, Ankodida, Anjatsikolo, Anbatotsilongolongo, Mahazoarivo, Masiabiby, and Mikea.

Within the protected regions it is known to inhabit, the ring-tailed lemur is sympatric (shares its range) with as many as 24 species of lemur, covering every living genus except Allocebus, Indri, and Varecia. Historically, the species used to be sympatric with the critically endangered southern black-and-white ruffed lemur (Varecia variegata editorum), which was once found at Andringitra National Park; however, no sightings of the ruffed lemur have been reported in recent years.

List of species sympatric with the ring-tailed lemur
Verreaux's sifaka (Propithecus verreauxi); Milne-Edwards' sifaka (Propithecus edwardsi); Peyrieras' woolly lemur (Avahi peyrierasi); Gray mouse lemur (Microcebus murinus); Brown mouse lemur (Microcebus rufus); Reddish-gray mouse lemur (Microcebus griseorufus); Aye-aye (Daubentonia madagascariensis); Fat-tailed dwarf lemur (Cheirogaleus medius)	Greater dwarf lemur (Cheirogaleus major); White-footed sportive lemur (Lepilemur leucopus); Small-toothed sportive lemur (Lepilemur microdon); Petter's sportive lemur (Lepilemur petteri); Red-tailed sportive lemur (Lepilemur ruficaudatus); Wright's sportive lemur (Lepilemur wrightae); Hubbard's sportive lemur (Lepilemur hubbardorum); Golden bamboo lemur (Hapalemur aureus)	Southern lesser bamboo lemur (Hapalemur meridionalis); Greater bamboo lemur (Prolemur simus); Common brown lemur (Eulemur fulvus); Red-fronted lemur (Eulemur rufifrons); Red-bellied lemur (Eulemur rubriventer); Collared brown lemur (Eulemur collaris); Coquerel's giant mouse lemur (Mirza coquereli); Pale fork-marked lemur (Phaner pallescens) (Note: The pale fork-marked lemur found at Zombitse-Vohibasia National Park may instead be a new species.)

In western Madagascar, sympatric ring-tailed lemurs and red-fronted lemurs (Eulemur rufifrons) have been studied together. Little interaction takes place between the two species. While the diets of the two species overlap, they eat in different proportions since the ring-tailed lemur has a more varied diet and spends more time on the ground.

=== Diet ===
The ring-tailed lemur is an opportunistic omnivore primarily eating fruits and leaves, particularly those of the tamarind tree (Tamarindus indica), known natively as kily. When available, tamarind makes up as much as 50% of the diet, especially during the dry, winter season. The ring-tailed lemur eats from as many as three dozen different plant species, and its diet includes stems, flowers, herbs, bark and exudates (latex, resin and sap). It has been observed eating decayed wood, earth (such as termite mounds), spider webs, insect cocoons, arthropods (spiders, caterpillars, cicadas and grasshoppers) and small vertebrates (small birds and chameleons). During the dry season it becomes increasingly opportunistic.

== Behavior ==
=== Social systems ===
Ring-tailed lemurs live in groups known as "troops," which are classified as multi-male groups, with a matriline as the core group. As with most lemurs, females socially dominate males in all circumstances, including feeding priority. Dominance is enforced by lunging, chasing, cuffing, grabbing and biting. Young females do not always inherit their mother's rank and young males leave the troop between three and five years of age. Both sexes have separate dominance hierarchies; females have a distinct hierarchy while male rank is correlated with age. Each troop has one to three central, high-ranking adult males who interact with females more than other group males and lead the troop procession with high-ranking females. Recently transferred males, old males or young adult males that have not yet left their natal group are often lower ranking. Staying at the periphery of the group they tend to be marginalized from group activity.

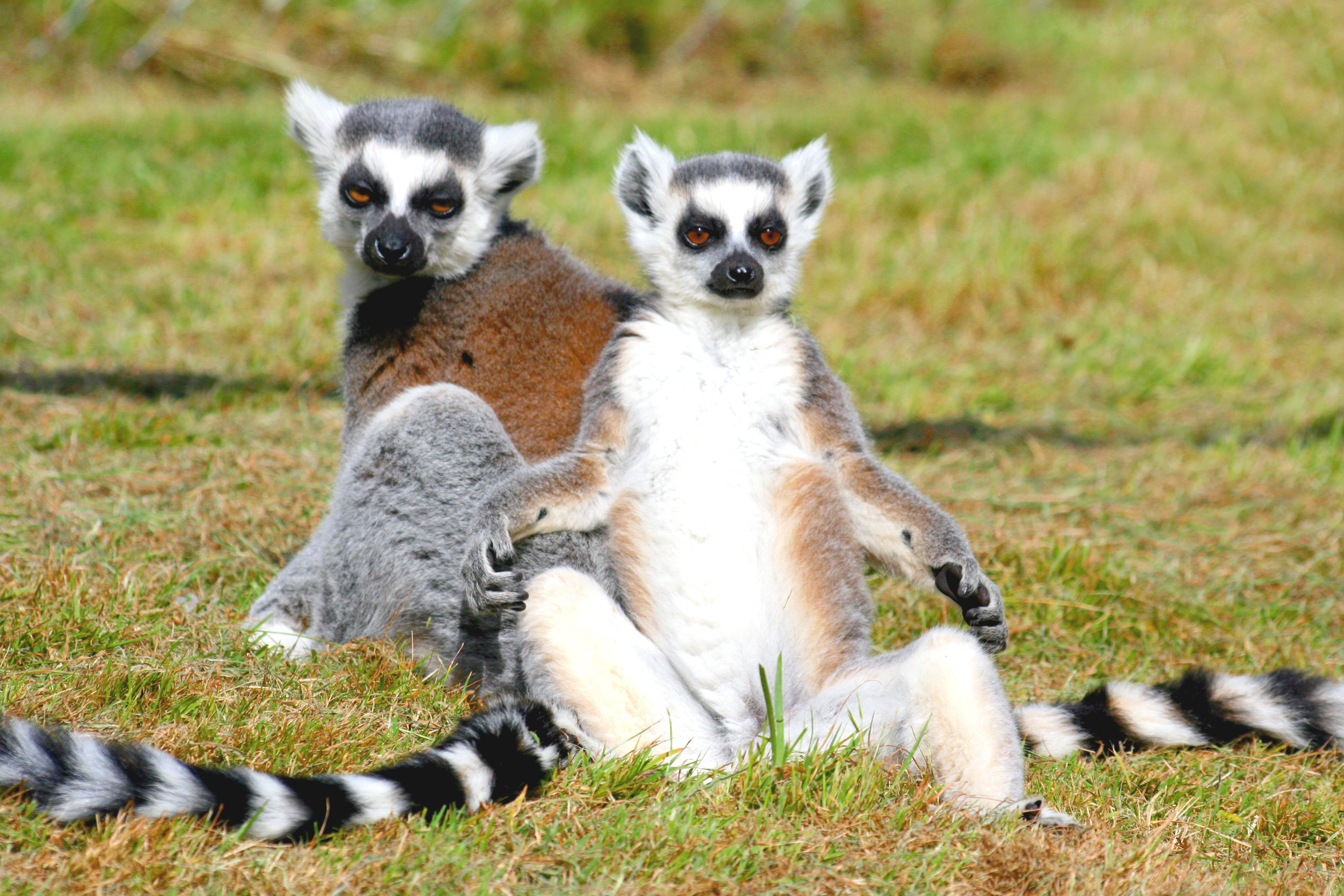
The ring-tailed lemur will sit facing the sun to warm itself in the mornings.

For males, social structure changes can be seasonal. During the six-month period between December and May a few males migrate between groups. Established males transfer on average every 3.5 years, although young males may transfer approximately every 1.4 years. Group fission occurs when groups get too large and resources become scarce.

In the mornings the ring-tailed lemur sunbathes to warm itself. It faces the sun sitting in what is frequently described as a "sun-worshipping" posture or lotus position. However, it sits with its legs extended outward, not cross-legged, and will often support itself on nearby branches. Sunning is often a group activity, particularly during the cold mornings. At night, troops will split into sleeping parties huddling closely together to keep warm.

Despite being quadrupedal the ring-tailed lemur can rear up and balance on its hind legs, usually for aggressive displays. When threatened, the ring-tailed lemur may jump in the air and strike out with its short nails and sharp upper canine teeth in a behavior termed jump fighting. This is extremely rare outside of the breeding season when tensions are high and competition for mates is intense. Other aggressive behaviors include a threat-stare, used to intimidate or start a fight, and a submissive gesture known as pulled-back lips.

Border disputes with rival troops occur occasionally and it is the dominant female's responsibility to defend the troop's home range. Agonistic encounters include staring, lunging approaches and occasional physical aggression, and conclude with troop members retreating toward the center of the home range.

==== Olfactory communication ====
Male ring-tailed lemurs will scent-mark saplings and branches by spur-marking.

Olfactory communication is critically important for strepsirrhines like the ring-tailed lemur. Males and females scent mark both vertical and horizontal surfaces at the overlaps in their home ranges using their anogenital scent glands. The ring-tailed lemur will perform a handstand to mark vertical surfaces, grasping the highest point with its feet while it applies its scent. Use of scent marking varies by age, sex and social status. Male lemurs use their antebrachial and brachial glands to demarcate territories and maintain intragroup dominance hierarchies. The thorny spur that overlays the antebrachial gland on each wrist is scraped against tree trunks to create grooves anointed with their scent. This is known as spur-marking.

In displays of aggression, males engage in a social display behaviour called stink fighting, which involves impregnating their tails with secretions from the antebrachial and brachial glands and waving the scented tail at male rivals.

Ring-tailed lemurs have also been shown to mark using urine. Behaviorally, there is a difference between regular urination, where the tail is slightly raised and a stream of urine is produced, and the urine-marking behavior, where the tail is held up in display and only a few drops of urine are used. The urine-marking behavior is typically used by females to mark territory, and has been observed primarily at the edges of the troop's territory and in areas where other troops may frequent. The urine marking behavior also is most frequent during the mating season, and may play a role in reproductive communication between groups.

==== Auditory communication ====
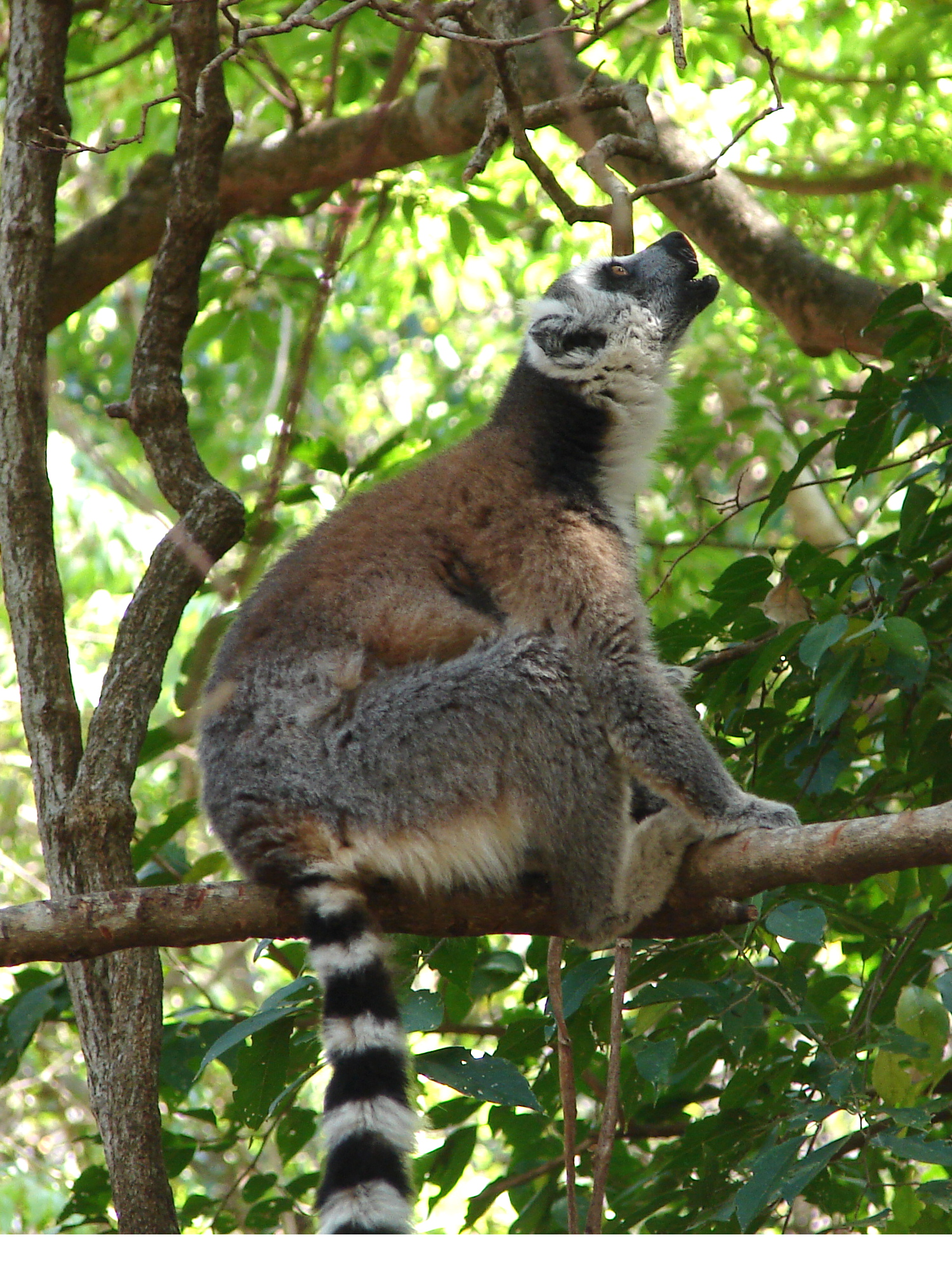
Ring-tailed lemurs are some of the most vocal primates.

The ring-tailed lemur is one of the most vocal primates and has a complex array of distinct vocalizations used to maintain group cohesion during foraging and alert group members to the presence of a predator. Calls range from simple to complex. An example of a simple call is the purr, which expresses contentment. A complex call is the sequence of clicks, close-mouth click series (CMCS), open-mouth click series (OMCS) and yaps used during predator mobbing. Some calls have variants and undergo transitions between variants, such as an infant "whit" (distress call) transitioning from one variant to another.

The most commonly heard vocalizations are the moan (low-to-moderate arousal, group cohesion), early-high wail (moderate-to-high arousal, group cohesion), and clicks ("location marker" to draw attention).

=== Breeding and reproduction ===
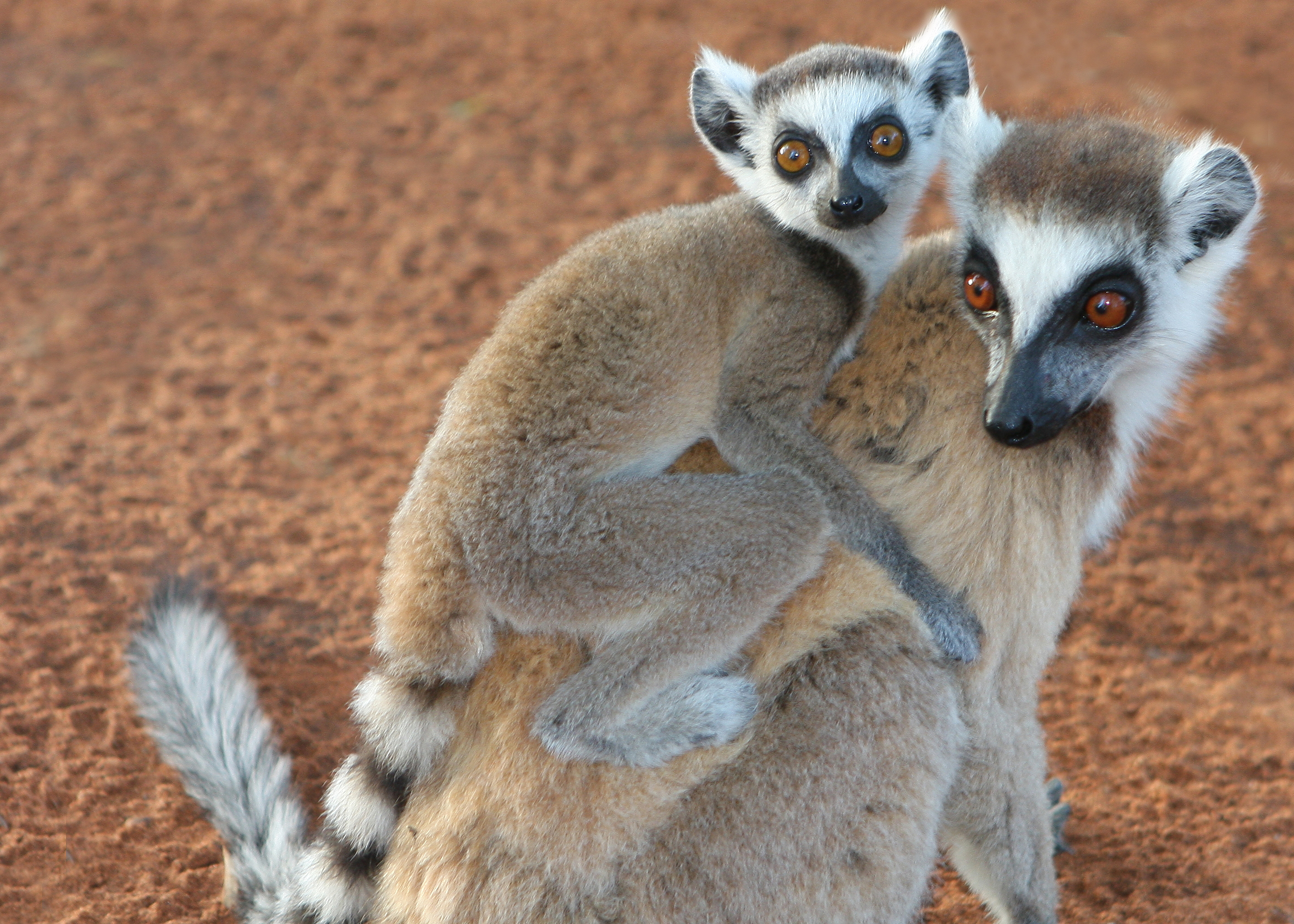
In the wild, females typically give birth to a single offspring.

The ring-tailed lemur is polygynandrous, although the dominant male in the troop typically breeds with more females than other males. Fighting is most common during the breeding season. A receptive female may initiate mating by presenting her backside, lifting her tail, and looking at the desired male over her shoulder. Males may inspect the female's genitals to determine receptiveness. Females typically mate within their troop, but may seek outside males.

The breeding season runs from mid-April to mid-May. Estrus lasts 4 to 6 hours, and females mate with multiple males during this period. Within a troop, females stagger their receptivity so that each female comes into season on a different day during the breeding season, reducing competition for male attention. Females lactate during the wet season, from December through April, when resources are readily available. Females gestate during the dry season, from May through September, when resources are low. Females give birth during seasons where resources, such as flowers, are in peak. Gestation lasts for about 135 days, and parturition occurs in September or occasionally October. In the wild, one offspring is the norm, although twins may occur. Ring-tailed lemur infants have a birth weight of 70 g (2.5 oz) and are carried ventrally (on the chest) for the first 1 to 2 weeks, then dorsally (on the back).

The young lemurs begin to eat solid food after two months and are fully weaned after five months. Sexual maturity is reached between 2.5 and 3 years. Male involvement in infant rearing is limited, although the entire troop, regardless of age or sex, can be seen caring for the young. Alloparenting between troop females has been reported. Kidnapping by females and infanticide by males also occur occasionally. Due to harsh environmental conditions, predation and accidents such as falls, infant mortality can be as high as 50% within the first year and as few as 30% may reach adulthood. The longest-lived ring-tailed lemur in the wild was a female at the Berenty Reserve who lived for 20 years. In the wild, females rarely live past the age of 16, whereas the life expectancy of males is not known due to their social structure. The longest-lived male was reported to be 15 years old. The maximum lifespan reported in captivity was 27 years.

=== Cognitive abilities and tool use ===
Historically, the studies of learning and cognition in non-human primates have focused on simians (monkeys and apes), while strepsirrhine primates, such as the ring-tailed lemur and its allies, have been overlooked and popularly dismissed as unintelligent. A couple of factors stemming from early experiments have played a role in the development of this assumption. First, the experimental design of older tests may have favored the natural behavior and ecology of simians over that of strepsirrhines, making the experimental tasks inappropriate for lemurs. For example, simians are known for their manipulative play with non-food objects, whereas lemurs are only known to manipulate non-food objects in captivity. This behavior is usually connected with food association. Also, lemurs are known to displace objects with their nose or mouth more so than with their hands. Therefore, an experiment requiring a lemur to manipulate an object without prior training would favor simians over strepsirrhines. Second, individual ring-tailed lemurs accustomed to living in a troop may not respond well to isolation for laboratory testing. Past studies have reported hysterical behavior in such scenarios.

The notion that lemurs are unintelligent has been perpetuated by the view that the neocortex ratio (as a measure of brain size) indicates intelligence. In fact, primatologist Alison Jolly noted early in her academic career that some lemur species, such as the ring-tailed lemur, have evolved a social complexity similar to that of cercopithecine monkeys, but not the corresponding intelligence. After years of observations of wild ring-tailed lemur populations at the Berenty Reserve in Madagascar and as well as baboons in Africa, Jolly concluded that this highly social lemur species does not demonstrate the equivalent social complexity of cercopithecine monkeys, despite general appearances.

Regardless, research has continued to illuminate the complexity of the lemur mind, with emphasis on the cognitive abilities of the ring-tailed lemur. As early as the mid-1970s, studies had demonstrated that they could be trained through operant conditioning using standard schedules of reinforcement. The species has been shown to be capable of learning pattern, brightness, and object discrimination, skills common among vertebrates. The ring-tailed lemur has also been shown to learn a variety of complex tasks often equaling, if not exceeding, the performance of simians.

More recently, research at the Duke Lemur Center has shown that the ring-tailed lemur can organize sequences in memory and retrieve ordered sequences without language. The experimental design demonstrated that the lemurs were using internal representation of the sequence to guide their responses and not simply following a trained sequence, where one item in the sequence cues the selection of the next. But this is not the limit of the ring-tailed lemur's reasoning skills. Another study, performed at the Myakka City Lemur Reserve, suggests that this species along with several other closely related lemur species understand simple arithmetic operations.

Since tool use is considered to be a key feature of primate intelligence, the apparent lack of this behavior in wild lemurs, as well as the lack of non-food object play, has helped reinforce the perception that lemurs are less intelligent than their simian cousins. However, another study at the Myakka City Lemur Reserve examined the representation of tool functionality in both the ring-tailed lemur and the common brown lemur and discovered that, like monkeys, they used tools with functional properties (e.g., tool orientation or ease of use) instead of tools with nonfunctional features (e.g., color or texture). Although the ring-tailed lemur may not use tools in the wild, it can not only be trained to use a tool, but will preferentially select tools based on their functional qualities. Therefore, the conceptual competence to use a tool may have been present in the common primate ancestor, even though the use of tools may not have appeared until much later.

== Conservation status ==
In addition to being listed as endangered in 2014 by the IUCN, the ring-tailed lemur has been listed since 1977 by CITES under Appendix I, which makes trade of wild-caught specimens illegal. Although there are more endangered species of lemur, the ring-tailed lemur is considered a flagship species due to its recognizability. As of 2017, only about 2,000 ring-tailed lemurs are estimated to be left in the wild, making the threat of extinction far more serious for them than previously believed.

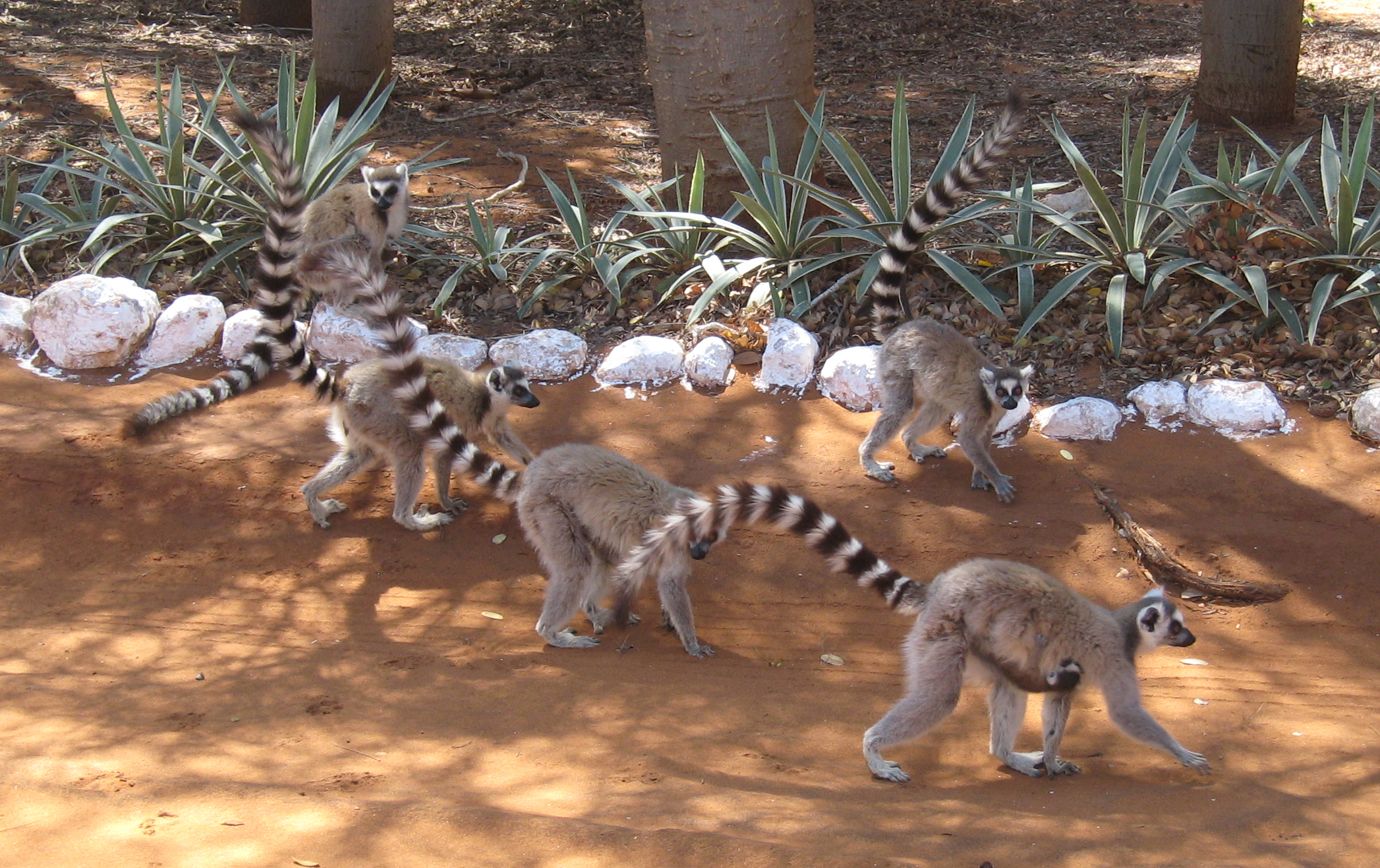
Ring-tailed lemurs are a common sight at Berenty Private Reserve in southern Madagascar.

Multiple factors threaten ring-tailed lemurs. First and foremost is habitat destruction. Starting nearly 2,000 years ago with the introduction of humans to the island, forests have been cleared to produce pasture and agricultural land. Extraction of hardwoods for fuel and lumber, as well mining and overgrazing, have also taken their toll. Today, it is estimated that 90% of Madagascar's original forest cover has been lost. Rising populations have created even greater demand in the southwest portion of the island for fuel wood, charcoal, and lumber. Fires from the clearing of grasslands, as well as slash-and-burn agriculture destroy forests. Another threat to the species is harvesting either for food (bushmeat), fur clothing or pets. Ring-tailed lemurs are also subject to predation by invasive species, including feral dogs and forest cats. Finally, periodic drought common to southern Madagascar can impact populations already in decline. In 1991 and 1992, for example, a severe drought caused an abnormally high mortality rate among infants and females at the Beza Mahafaly Special Reserve. Two years later, the population had declined by 31% and took nearly four years to start to recover.

The ring-tailed lemur resides in several protected areas within its range, each offering varying levels of protection. At the Beza Mahafaly Special Reserve, a holistic approach to in-situ conservation has been taken. Not only does field research and resource management involve international students and local people (including school children), livestock management is used at the peripheral zones of the reserve and ecotourism benefits the local people.

A ring-tailed lemur in Dudley Zoo

Outside of its diminishing habitat and other threats, the ring-tailed lemur reproduces readily and has fared well in captivity. For this reason, along with its popularity, it has become the most populous lemur in zoos worldwide, with more than 2500 in captivity as of 2009. It is also the most common of all captive primates. Ex situ facilities actively involved in the conservation of the ring-tailed lemur include the Duke Lemur Center in Durham, North Carolina, the Lemur Conservation Foundation in Myakka City, Florida, and the Madagascar Fauna Group headquartered at the Saint Louis Zoo. Due to the high success of captive breeding, reintroduction is a possibility if wild populations were to crash. Although experimental releases have met success on St. Catherines Island in Georgia, demonstrating that captive lemurs can readily adapt to their environment and exhibit a full range of natural behaviors, captive release is not currently being considered.

Ring-tailed lemur populations can also benefit from drought intervention, due to the availability of watering troughs and introduced fruit trees, as seen at the Berenty Private Reserve in southern Madagascar. However, these interventions are not always seen favorably, since natural population fluctuations are not permitted. The species is thought to have evolved its high fecundity due to its harsh environment.

== Cultural references ==
The ring-tailed lemur is known locally in Malagasy as maky (pronounced [ˈmakʲi̥], and spelled maki in French) or hira (pronounced [ˈhirə] or colloquially [ˈir]). Being the most widely recognized endemic primate on the island, it has been selected as the symbol for Madagascar National Parks (formerly known as ANGAP). The Maki brand, which started by selling T-shirts in Madagascar and now sells clothing across the Indian Ocean islands, is named after this lemur due to its popularity, even though the company's logo portrays the face of a sifaka and its name uses the French spelling.

The first mention of the ring-tailed lemur in Western literature came in 1625 when English traveller and writer Samuel Purchas described them as being comparable in size to a monkey and having a fox-like long tail with black and white rings. Charles Catton included the species in his 1788 book Animals Drawn from Nature and Engraved in Aqua-tinta, calling it the "Maucauco" and regarding it as a type of monkey.

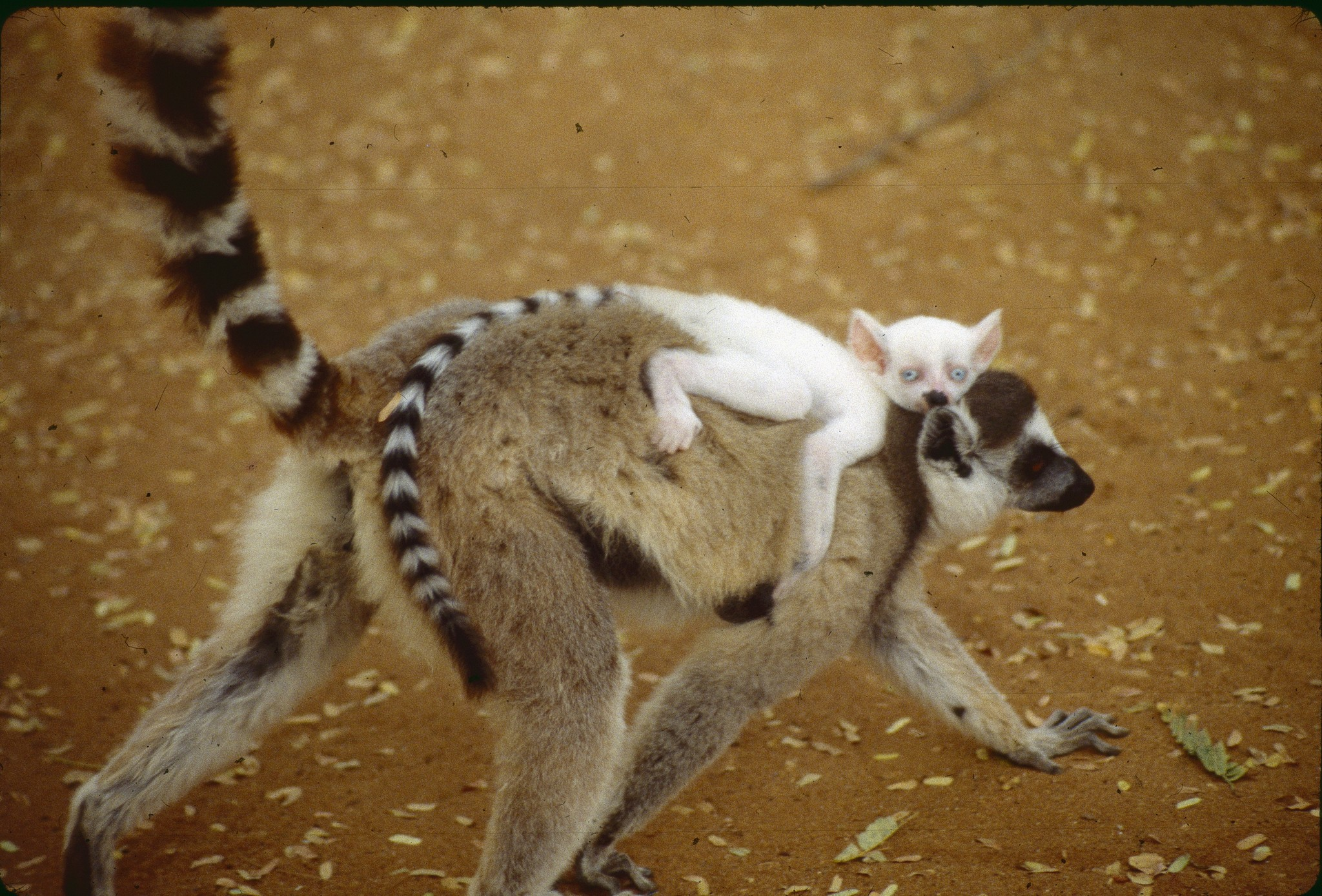
A leucistic infant named Sapphire

The species was further popularized by the Animal Planet television series Lemur Street, as well as by the character King Julien in the animated Madagascar film and TV franchise. The ring-tailed lemur was also the focus of the 1996 Nature documentary A Lemur's Tale, which was filmed at the Berenty Reserve and followed a troop of lemurs. The troop included a special infant named Sapphire, who was nearly albino, with white fur, bright blue eyes, and the characteristic ringed tail.

A Ring-tailed lemur played a role in the 1997 comedy film Fierce Creatures, starring John Cleese, who has a passion for lemurs. Cleese later hosted the 1998 BBC documentary In the Wild: Operation Lemur with John Cleese, which tracked the progress of a reintroduction of black-and-white ruffed lemurs back into the Betampona Reserve in Madagascar. The project had been partly funded by Cleese's donation of the proceeds from the London premier of Fierce Creatures.
