= Ifotaka =

- Location in Madagascar
- Coordinates: 24°48′10″S 46°08′09″E
- Country: Madagascar
- Region: Anosy
- District: Amboasary Sud
- Elevation: 67 m (220 ft)

Population (2018)
  - Total: 21.750
  - Ethnicities: Antandroy
- Time zone: UTC3 (EAT)
- postal code: 603
- Climate: BSh

Ifotaka is a town and commune in Madagascar. It belongs to the district of Amboasary Sud, which is part of Anosy Region. The population of the commune was estimated to be approximately 21.750 in 2018.

It is situated at the Mandrare River, about 45 km north-west of Amboasary Sud.

Primary and junior level secondary education are available in town. The majority 50% of the population of the commune are farmers, while an additional 40% receives their livelihood from raising livestock. The most important crop is cassava, while other important products are maize and sweet potatoes. Industry and services provide both employment for 5% of the population.

== Agriculture ==
Commercial cultivation of sisal.
