= Elonty =

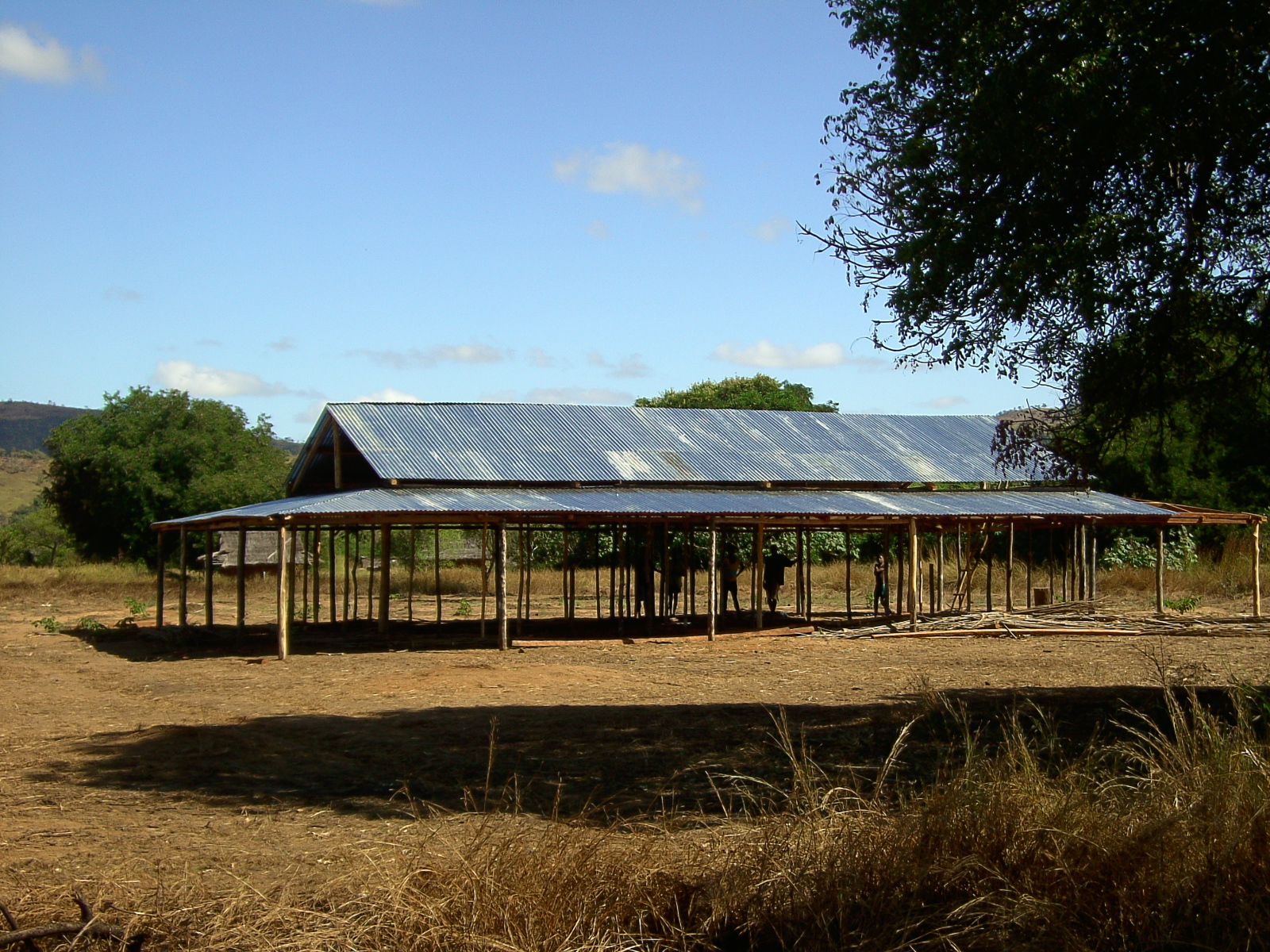
- a school in Tamotamo, Elonty.

- Location in Madagascar
- Coordinates: 24°2′S 46°13′E
- Country: Madagascar
- Region: Anosy
- District: Amboasary Sud

Area
  - Total: 1,150 km^{2} (440 sq mi)
- Elevation: 348 m (1,142 ft)

Population (2001)
  - Total: 8,000
- Time zone: UTC3 (EAT)
- Postal code: 603

Elonty is a rural municipality in Madagascar. It belongs to the district of Amboasary Sud, which is a part of Anosy Region. The population of the commune was estimated to be approximately 8,000 in 2001 commune census. It is situated at 23 km north-east of Tsivory.

11 fokontany (villages) belong to this commune: Elonty, Tamotamo-Bas, Fanjakamandroso, Mahazoarivo, Beadabo-Nord, Soamanonga, Besakoa-Nord, Androtsy-Bemandresy, Marofaroha, Emieba and Ambatomanaky.

Only primary schooling is available. The majority 90% of the population of the commune are farmers, while an additional 8% receives their livelihood from raising livestock. The most important crop is rice, while other important products are peanuts, maize and cassava. Services provide employment for 2% of the population.
