= Marotsiraka =

- Location in Madagascar
- Coordinates: 24°17′S 45°59′E
- Country: Madagascar
- Region: Anosy
- District: Amboasary Sud

Area
  - Total: 913 km^{2} (353 sq mi)
- Elevation: 252 m (827 ft)

Population (2001)
  - Total: 14,000
- Time zone: UTC3 (EAT)

Marotsiraka is a town and commune in Madagascar. It belongs to the district of Amboasary Sud, which is a part of Anosy Region. The population of the commune was estimated to be approximately 14,000 in 2001 commune census.

This rural commune covers 22 fokontany (villages): Tomboarivo, Anivorano, Antsonjo, Mahazoarivo, Marotsiraka, Tanambao, Antsariky, Befihamy, Tombonaly, Anjadoaky, Sakafia, Antranontany, Manandavenoky, Bekolaly, Mitsinjo, Ankiliroa, Andindo, Ambinanivelo, Beadabo, Soaserana II, Voravy and Antaralava. It is situated 35 km south-west of Tsivory to which it is connected by the RIP 117.

Only primary schooling is available. The majority 90% of the population of the commune are farmers, while an additional 8% receives their livelihood from raising livestock. The most important crop is rice, while other important products are maize and cassava. Services provide employment for 2% of the population.
