= Tanandava Sud =

Tanandava Sud Tanandava Atsimo
- Location in Madagascar
- Coordinates: 25°8′S 46°27′E
- Country: Madagascar
- Region: Anosy
- District: Amboasary Sud
- Elevation: 31 m (102 ft)

Population (2018)Census
  - Total: 9,586
- Time zone: UTC3 (EAT)
- Postal code: 603

Tanandava Sud (Tanandava Atsimo) is a town and commune in Madagascar. It belongs to the district of Amboasary Sud, which is a part of Anosy Region. It has a population of 9586 inhabitants in 2018.

Primary and junior level secondary education are available in town. Farming and raising livestock provides employment for 30% and 30% of the working population. The most important crop is beans, while other important products are maize, sweet potatoes and rice. Industry and services provide employment for 9% and 1% of the population, respectively. Additionally fishing employs 30% of the population.
