= Maromby =

- Location in Madagascar
- Coordinates: 24°21′S 46°34′E
- Country: Madagascar
- Region: Anosy
- District: Amboasary Sud
- Elevation: 338 m (1,109 ft)

Population (2001)
  - Total: 12,000
- Time zone: UTC3 (EAT)

Maromby is a town and commune in Madagascar. It belongs to the district of Amboasary Sud, which is a part of Anosy Region. The population of the commune was estimated to be approximately 12,000 in 2001 commune census.

Only primary schooling is available. The majority 70% of the population of the commune are farmers, while an additional 20% receives their livelihood from raising livestock. The most important crop is rice, while other important products are maize and cassava. Industry and services provide employment for 2% and 8% of the population, respectively.
