= Manevy =

- Location in Madagascar
- Coordinates: 24°23′S 46°48′E
- Country: Madagascar
- Region: Anosy
- District: Amboasary Sud
- Elevation: 620 m (2,030 ft)

Population (2001)
  - Total: 9,000
- Time zone: UTC3 (EAT)

Manevy is a town and commune in Madagascar. It belongs to the district of Amboasary Sud, which is a part of Anosy Region. The population of the commune was estimated to be approximately 9,000 in 2001 commune census.

Only primary schooling is available. The majority 60% of the population of the commune are farmers, while an additional 35% receives their livelihood from raising livestock. The most important crop is cassava, while other important products are peanuts, maize and rice. Services provide employment for 5% of the population.
