= Behara =

- Location in Madagascar
- Coordinates: 24°57′S 46°23′E
- Country: Madagascar
- Region: Anosy
- District: Amboasary Sud
- Elevation: 49 m (161 ft)

Population (2018)
  - Total: 27,285
- Time zone: UTC3 (EAT)
- Climate: BSh

Behara is a town and commune in Madagascar. It belongs to the district of Amboasary Sud, which is a part of Anosy Region. The population of the commune was estimated to be approximately 27,285 in 2018.

This town is crossed by the Mananara Sud river.

Primary and junior level secondary education are available in town. The majority 80% of the population of the commune are farmers, while an additional 15% receives their livelihood from raising livestock. The most important crops are cassava and rice; also sweet potatoes are an important agricultural product. Services provide employment for 5% of the population.
