= Esira =

- Location in Madagascar
- Coordinates: 24°20′S 46°42′E
- Country: Madagascar
- Region: Anosy
- District: Amboasary Sud
- Elevation: 469 m (1,539 ft)

Population (2001)
  - Total: 10,000
- Time zone: UTC3 (EAT)

Esira is a town and commune in Madagascar, in the southern part of the island. It belongs to the district of Amboasary Sud, which is a part of Anosy Region. The population of the commune was estimated to be approximately 10,000 in 2001 commune census.

Primary and junior level secondary education are available in town. The majority 90% of the population of the commune are farmers, while an additional 6% receives their livelihood from raising livestock. The most important crop is rice, while other important products are maize and cassava. Services provide employment for 4% of the population.
