= Ebelo =

- Location in Madagascar
- Coordinates: 24°29′S 46°2′E
- Country: Madagascar
- Region: Anosy
- District: Amboasary Sud
- Elevation: 164 m (538 ft)

Population (2001)
  - Total: 10,000
- Time zone: UTC3 (EAT)
- Climate: BSh

Ebelo is a town and commune in Madagascar. It belongs to the district of Amboasary Sud, which is a part of Anosy Region. The population of the commune was estimated to be approximately 10,000 in 2001 commune census.

Only primary schooling is available. The majority 90% of the population of the commune are farmers, while an additional 6% receives their livelihood from raising livestock. The most important crop is rice, while other important products are maize and cassava. Services provide employment for 4% of the population.
