= Sampona =

- Location in Madagascar
- Coordinates: 25°9′S 46°19′E
- Country: Madagascar
- Region: Anosy
- District: Amboasary Sud
- Elevation: 278 m (912 ft)

Population (2001)
  - Total: 11,000
- Time zone: UTC3 (EAT)

Sampona is a town and commune in Madagascar. It belongs to the district of Amboasary Sud, which is a part of Anosy Region. The population of the commune was estimated to be approximately 11,000 in 2001 commune census.

Only primary schooling is available. The majority 92% of the population of the commune are farmers, while an additional 5% receives their livelihood from raising livestock. The most important crop is cassava, while other important products are maize and sweet potatoes. Services provide employment for 3% of the population.
