= Antandroy =

Ethnic group in Madagascar

Tandroy
Total population
- c. 600,000

Regions with significant populations
- Madagascar

Languages
- Tandroy

Related ethnic groups
- Other Malagasy groups, Austronesian peoples, Bantu peoples

The Tandroy also known as Ampatres in the 17th century are a traditionally nomadic ethnic group of Madagascar inhabiting the arid southern part of the island called Androy. In the 17th century however, the Tandroy emerged as a confederation of two groups ruled by the Zafimanara dynasty until major flooding caused the kingdom to disband around 1790. The difficult terrain and climate of Tandroy protected and isolated the population, sparing them from subjugation by the Kingdom of Imerina in the 19th century; later, the French colonial authority also struggled to exert its influence over this population. Since independence the Tandroy have suffered prejudice and economic marginalization, prompting widespread migration and intermarriage with other ethnic groups, and leading them to play a key role in the protests that sparked the end of President Philibert Tsiranana's administration in 1972.

The Tandroy may also be called the Antandroy, but it is technically redundant: roy means thorn; the prefix an means place of; and the additional t means from.

While the Tandroy share many common cultural features with other ethnic groups in Madagascar, such as respect for the ancestors, a common language and complex funeral rites, certain practices set them apart. They are particularly known for their distinctive dances, cotton woven clothing, elaborately decorated tombs, and unique use of plank architecture in the construction of their houses. Also unlike most Malagasy ethnic groups they rely more heavily on tubers, yams, millet and other crops that are less dependent on water for cultivation than the rice so prevalent elsewhere on the island. The herding of zebu remains the principal economic activity of the Tandroy, and their tombs are commonly decorated with numerous zebu skulls as an indication of wealth.

== Ethnic identity ==
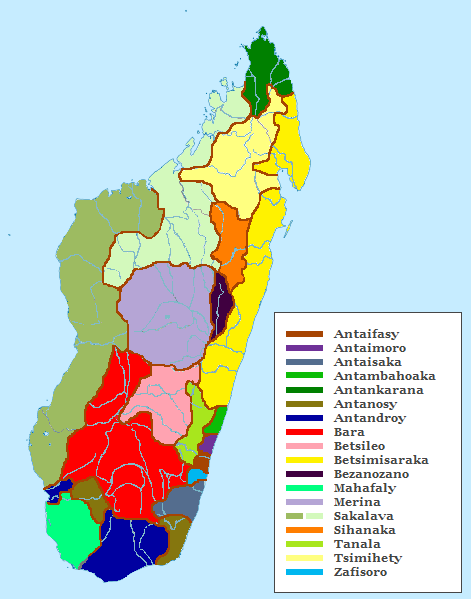
Distribution of Malagasy ethnic groups

The name Tandroy means "people of the thorns" in reference to the spiny thickets of endemic plants that characterize the southwestern region of Madagascar. Their traditional homeland forms the modern Androy Region, which is roughly located between Amboasary and Beloha and between the ocean and Bekily; the population is most concentrated around Ambovombe.

There are around 600,000 Tandroy as of 2013. They constitute the fifth largest ethnic group on the island.

== History ==
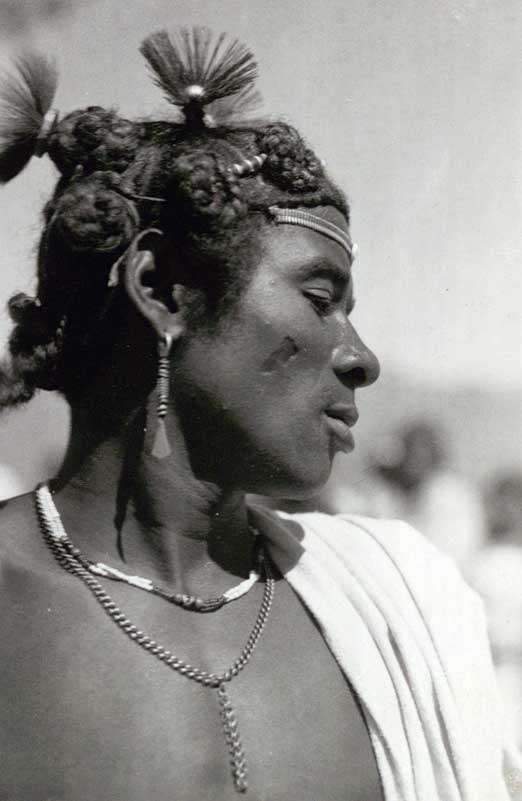
Antandroy dancer and medicine man, 1936

The inhabitants of the Tandroy region identify with one of two distinct traditions. The oral history of the Karimbola clan inhabiting the western portion of Tandroy does not describe a migration into the area, but rather implies the inhabitants were always present. In the early 18th century, the westernmost portion of Tandroy was conquered by the Menarandra dynasty of the neighboring Mahafaly people. In the eastern portion of Tandroy, the original population of the Mahandrovato clan was gradually outnumbered by Antanosy and Bara refugees. By the early 18th century a centralized confederation emerged to unite all those living between the Menarandra and Mendare rivers. This confederation was ruled by a dynasty of Zafimanara, a sub-group of the Mahandrovato clan, which gave the region and its people the name Tandroy. Zafimanara power waned around 1790 when significant flooding and the consequent ecological upheaval prompted them to flee to the Manombo plateau. The Tandroy have never been part of the Merina Kingdom.

Throughout French colonization of Madagascar (1897-1960), the Tandroy - alongside the Mahafaly - were viewed as the most uncivilized of the island's ethnic groups. This perception spread among fellow Malagasy, establishing a stereotype that characterized the Antandroy as half-clothed savages.

The toppling of the Tsiranana presidency and end of the First Republic in 1972 was sparked by the armed protest of Antandroy peasants in Toliara against corruption in tax collection.

== Society ==
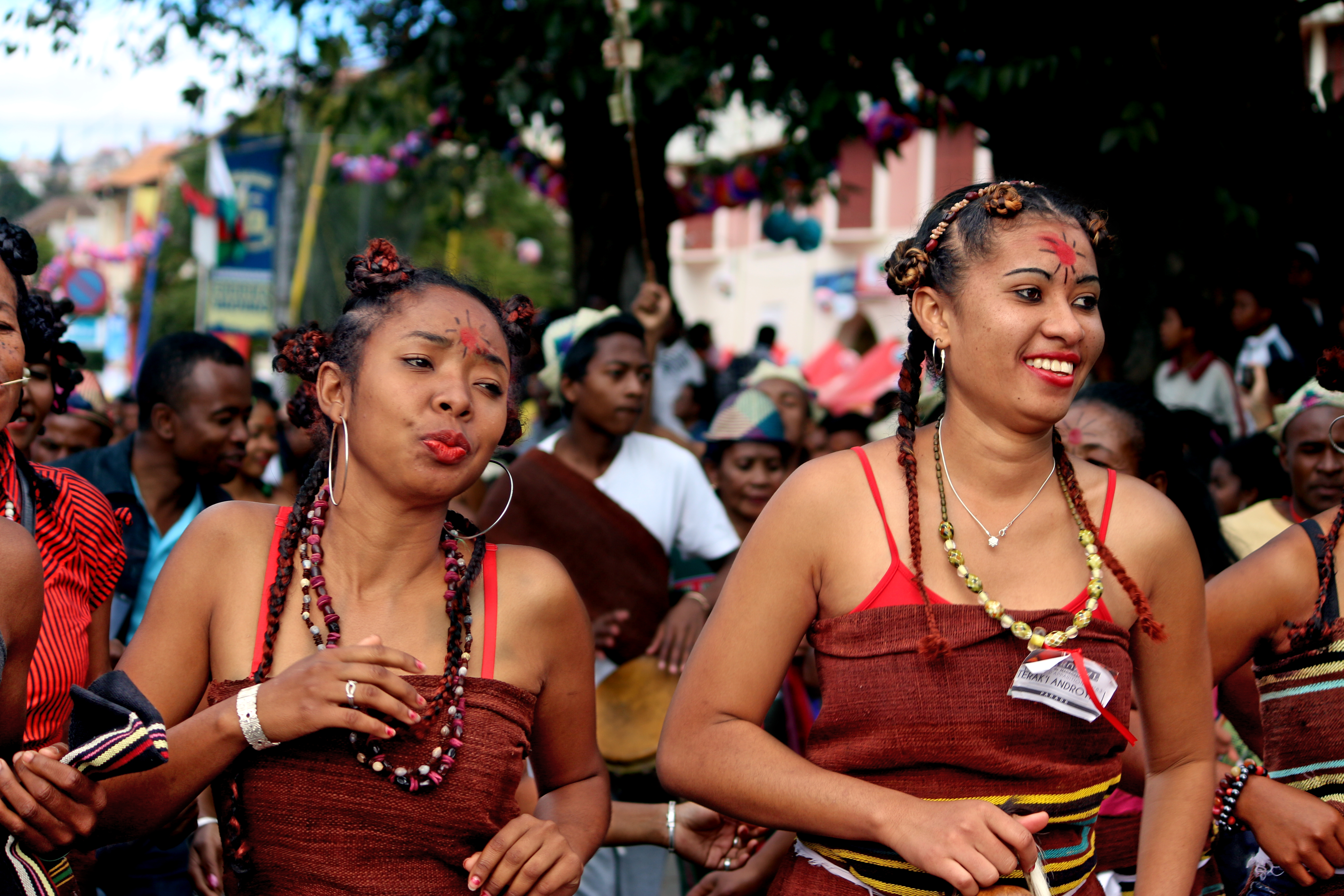
Antandroy women

The Tandroy are a traditionally nomadic ethnic group of Madagascar inhabiting the arid southern part of the island called Androy. The harshness of the environment they inhabit has historically served to largely isolate and protect them from attack by other Malagasy ethnic groups; the French also struggled to exert authority over the Antandroy after colonization. After national independence from France in 1960, the Tandroy (as well as the Merina) became the most common practitioners of interethnic marriage, in large part to the frequent migration of Tandroy men in search of economic opportunity.

=== Family affiliation ===
Tandroy families are patriarchal and women are expected to be subordinate to the males in their family. Circumcision is an important ritual for male Tandroy, and among some communities the foreskin is shot from the barrel of a gun in celebration.

=== Religious affiliation ===
The Tandroy share the common Malagasy beliefs in a creator god and the eternal life and power of the ancestors, who intervene in the affairs of the living and who must be respected. The Tandroy commune with and can be possessed by the ancestors by entering a trance state called bilo. Crocodiles are commonly feared among the Tandroy, and members of the Zafindravoay clan believe they are the descendants of a union between a Tandroy woman and a crocodile. In addition, the kokolampo spirit is believed to be able to exert positive or negative influence over events in the life of a Tandroy.

Christianity was introduced in southern Madagascar beginning in the late 19th century, predominantly by Lutheran missionaries; this remains the predominant form of Christianity among the Tandroy, although most continue to adhere to traditional beliefs. Mpisoro soothsayers are a common feature of Tandroy village society and are a respected authority in traditional communities.

== Culture ==
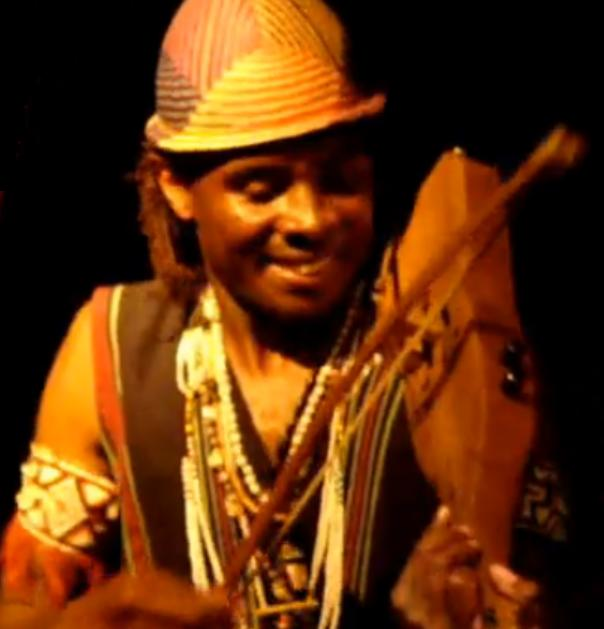
The lokanga played by a member of the group Vilon'androy

The Tandroy consume less rice than the average Malagasy because of the extreme aridity of Toliara province. They have rather subsisted on a traditional diet of maize, sweet potato, manioc, and zebu milk and curd. Other staples include yams, taro root, and millet, generally boiled in water and occasionally served in whole milk or flavored with crushed peanuts.

Whereas most dwellings in Madagascar are traditionally constructed from pliable plant materials, the Tandroy are one of the few ethnic groups to use wood plank to build their homes. Tandroy homes are traditionally square (not rectangular, as elsewhere on the island), raised on low stilts, topped with a peaked roof and constructed of vertically-hung planks of wood affixed to a wooden frame. These houses traditionally have no windows and feature three wooden doors: the front door is the women's entrance, the door at the rear of the house is for children, and the third door is used by the men. Fences are often constructed around Antandroy houses using prickly-pear cactus (raketa) or lengths of indigenous succulents from the surrounding spiny forests.

As the southern arid region of Tandroy is hot much of the year, clothing among the Tandroy is often minimal. Traditional clothing is mainly made of hand-carded and spun cotton which is woven to form lamba wrappers and loincloths. Weaving continues to be done uniquely by women, who use a wooden spindle rolled against their thigh to twist the cotton into threads for weaving. Before the thread is dipped in a stiffening solution it is called fole velo ("living yarn") and is believed to be imbued with spiritual power. For this reason, fole velo is used in numerous Antandroy rituals such as the circumcision ceremony, and is tied around others' wrists by an ambiasa (healer) to offer protection. Raw silk (landy) is also sometimes used to make clothing.

=== Fady ===
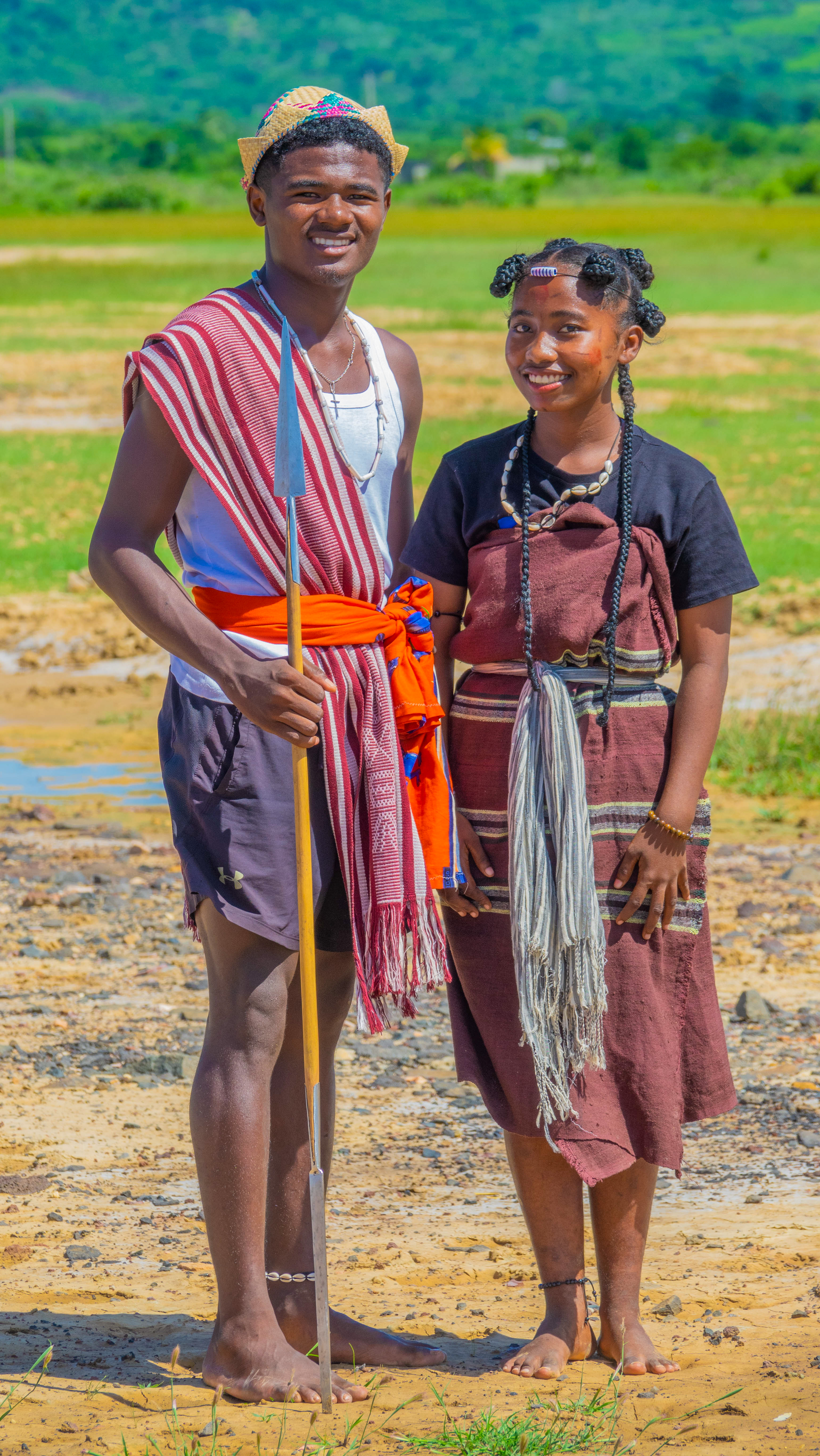
Antandroy man and woman

The Tandroy adhere to a variety of fady (taboos) established by elders and ancestors. Antandroy women are prohibited from milking zebu. There is a general fady in Antandroy society against killing the radiated tortoise, and a particular Tandroy king was forbidden to so much as look at one. It is also fady to mention the name of a deceased king.

=== Funeral rites ===
Upon the death of an Tandroy, family members organize a communal funeral feast. Zebu are sacrificed and their meat given to the community. After laying in state for several days, the deceased's body is placed in a coffin, and more zebu are slaughtered. The mood at this ceremony can be celebratory, and among some Tandroy, community members will pick up the coffin and run into the sea with it. Afterward the coffin is placed in a tomb for the male head of household and his immediate family members. Like the neighboring Mahafaly, the tombs of the Tandroy are called fanesy ("your eternal place"). These are large and rectangular - the larger the tomb, the more wealthy the man - and are decorated with colorful paintings. Tall stones are traditionally placed on each side to represent male and female; in recent years, towers are often constructed in lieu of the stones. The skulls of the zebu slaughtered for the funeral feast are placed on top of the tomb to indicate the deceased's wealth.

Transfer of the coffin to the tomb may take as long as several months while the building is completed. During this period of construction another two-day mourning ceremony takes place; zebu sacrifice and ritual wailing may again take place upon placing the coffin in the tomb. Once the coffin has been placed, stones are heaped over it to fill the tomb. The deceased's house is then destroyed by fire to complete the funeral rites. Family and community members will not return to visit the tomb.

=== Dance and music ===
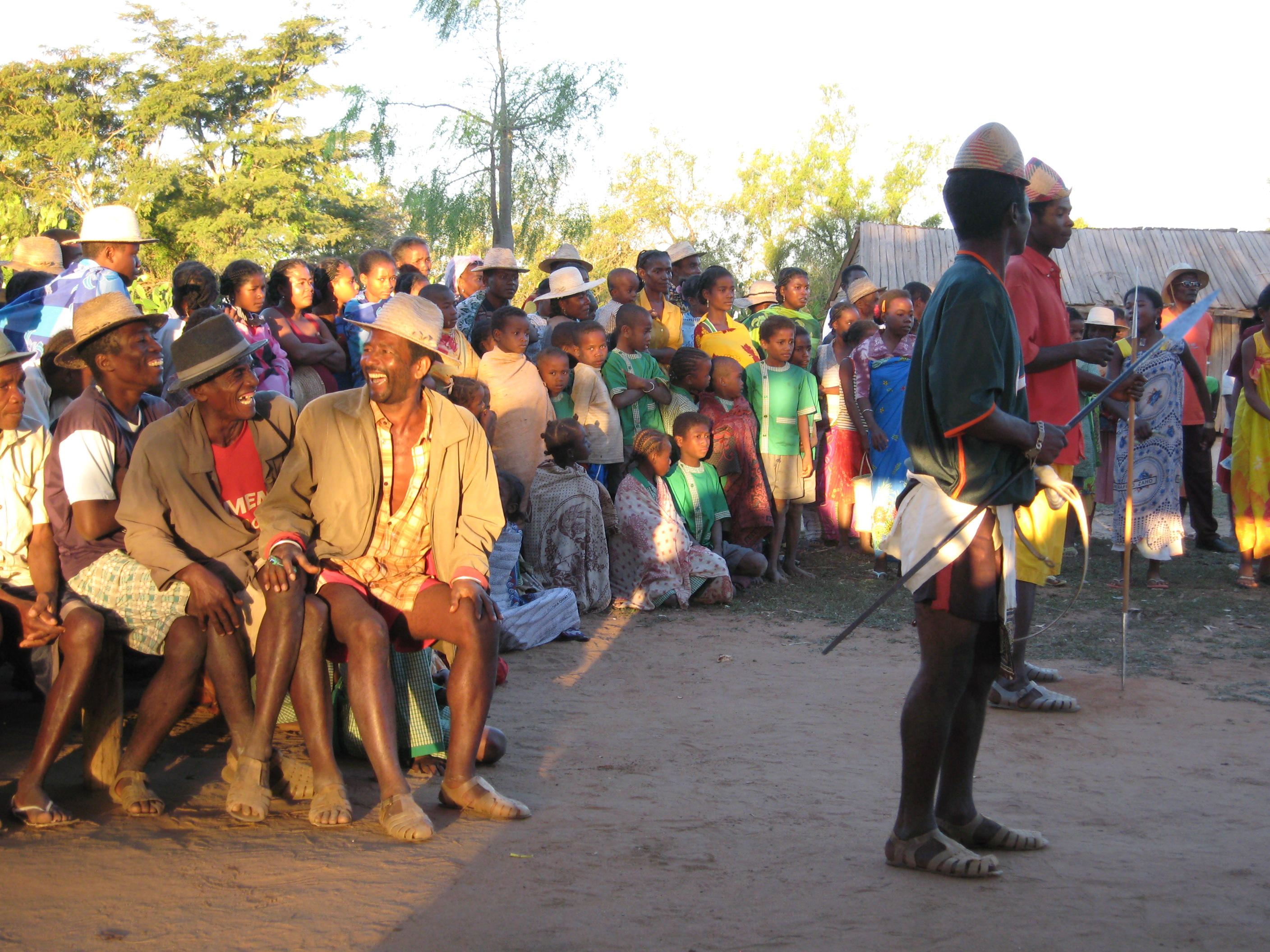
A performance of Antandroy dance

Stringed instruments are common among the Tandroy. They construct marovany (box zithers) from pine planks, using unwound bicycle cables as strings. The mandolina and gitara are the Antandroy names of a popular Southern chordophone similar to the kabosy but with nylon fishing line for strings and five or seven movable frets that facilitate modification of the instrument's tuning. The lokanga is a stringed instrument popular with the Tandroy that has a gourd resonator and is played with a bow, much like the jejy voatavo played further north, but with the resonator carved to resemble a three-stringed fiddle. Tandroy vocal music features rich polyharmonic melodies. The unique traditional dances of the Tandroy are performed with spears and accompanied by distinctive music punctuated with shrill whistles and fipple flutes.

== Language ==
The Tandroy speak a dialect of the Malagasy language, which is a branch of the Malayo-Polynesian language group derived from the Barito languages, spoken in southern Borneo.

== Economy ==
Cattle herding is the main economic activity of the Antandroy. They also practice subsistence farming of cassava, millet, rice and maize. Honey is also a major product of the Antandroy.

Historically, the Tandroy were known as great ironsmiths; their skill in repairing firearms was particularly reputed in the imperial period prior to French colonization in 1897. Today, many Antandroy men travel seasonally to neighboring areas to search for paid work.

== Additional information ==
A museum dedicated to Tandroy culture and history operates within the Berenty Reserve, approximately two hours north of Taolagnaro. Described as "undoubtedly the best ethnographic museum in Madagascar", the Museum of the Tandroy features photo exhibitions and displays traditional arts and handicrafts; a model Tandroy house may be visited on the adjacent grounds.
