= Lokanga bara =

The lokanga bara (sometimes referred to by the generic term lokanga) is a three-stringed fiddle popular among the Southern Antandroy and Bara ethnic groups of Madagascar.

The related term lokanga bazaha ("foreign lokanga") is used to refer to the European violin.
