= Tsivory =

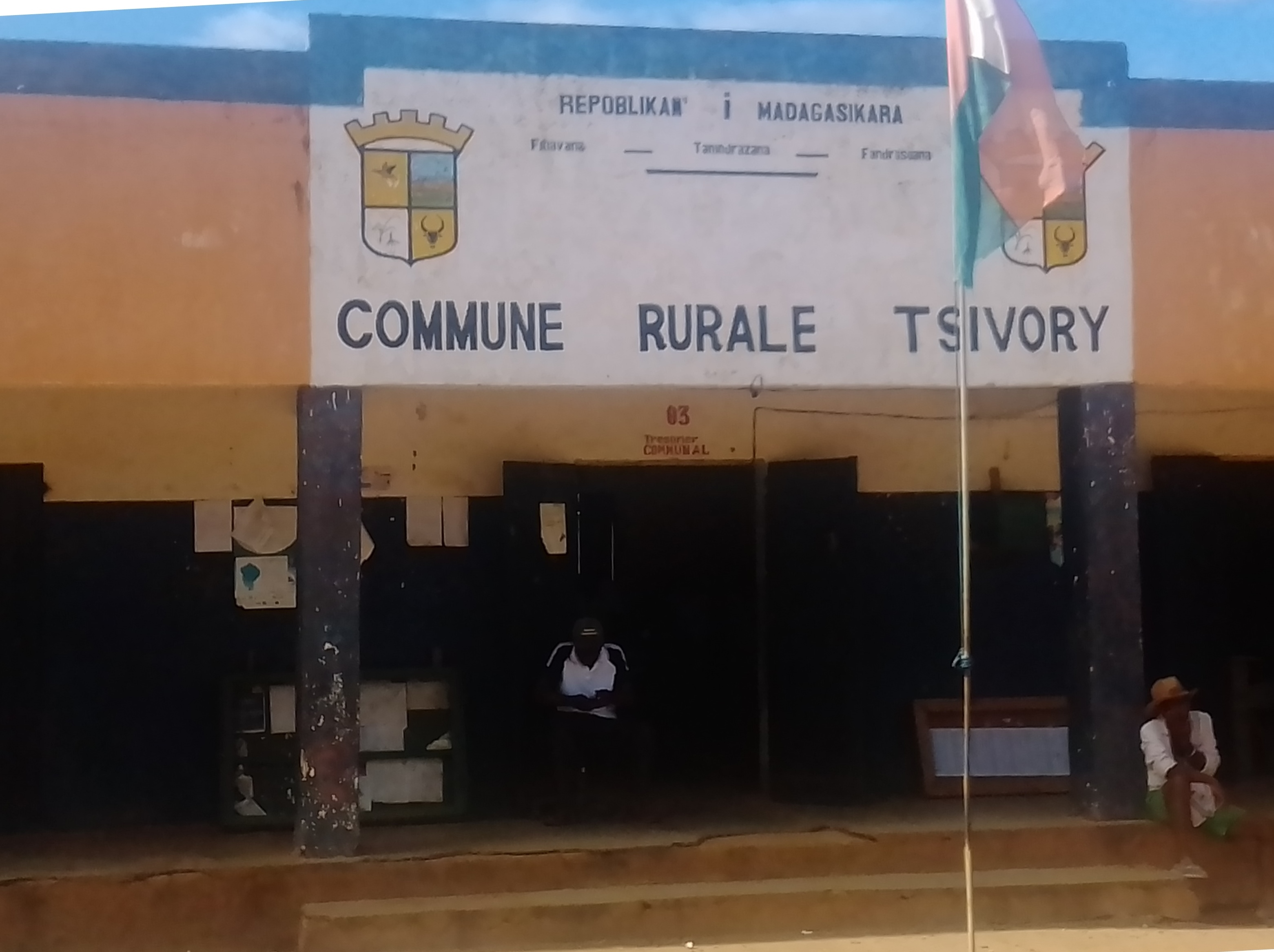

- Location in Madagascar
- Coordinates: 24°04′S 46°04′E
- Country: Madagascar
- Region: Anosy
- District: Amboasary Sud

Area
  - Total: 1,227 km^{2} (474 sq mi)
- Elevation: 400 m (1,300 ft)

Population (2018)
  - Total: 18,694
  - Density: 9.75/km^{2} (25.3/sq mi)
  - Ethnicities: Antandroy Bara Antanosy
- Time zone: UTC3 (EAT)
- postal code: 603
- Climate: BSh

Tsivory is a rural commune in Anosy region in southern Madagascar. It is located at 225km from Fort Dauphin and 148 km from Amboasary Sud to which it is connected by the provincial road RIP 107. In 2018 it had a population of 18,694.

The commune counts 13 Fokontany (village commune) that are distributed over 55 villages.

From 1996 to 2008, Tsivory hosted the headquarters of the PHBM Project of the Government of Madagascar support by the International Fund for Agriculture Development. PHBM stands for "Projet de Développement du Haut Bassin du Mandrare".

This project has constructed or renovated more than 200 km of roads, and 5000 ha of irrigation schemes. The livelihood of the 18,694 people living in the surrounding 11 communes has considerably improved during the past 10 years, and the production has doubled. The area now produces 22,000 tons of rice per year (compared to 1500 tons in the 1990s).

The project closed in September 2008 and farmers associations are pursuing the rural development work. The closing workshop was held in Fort Dauphin early December 2008.

== Ethnics ==
Antandroy, Bara and Antanosy are the main people.

== Agriculture ==
Rice, manioc, corn, peanuts, vegetables, zebu breeding are the principal agricultural activities.
