= Berenty Reserve =

Protected area in Madagascar

Coordinates: 25°00′33″S 46°18′08″E

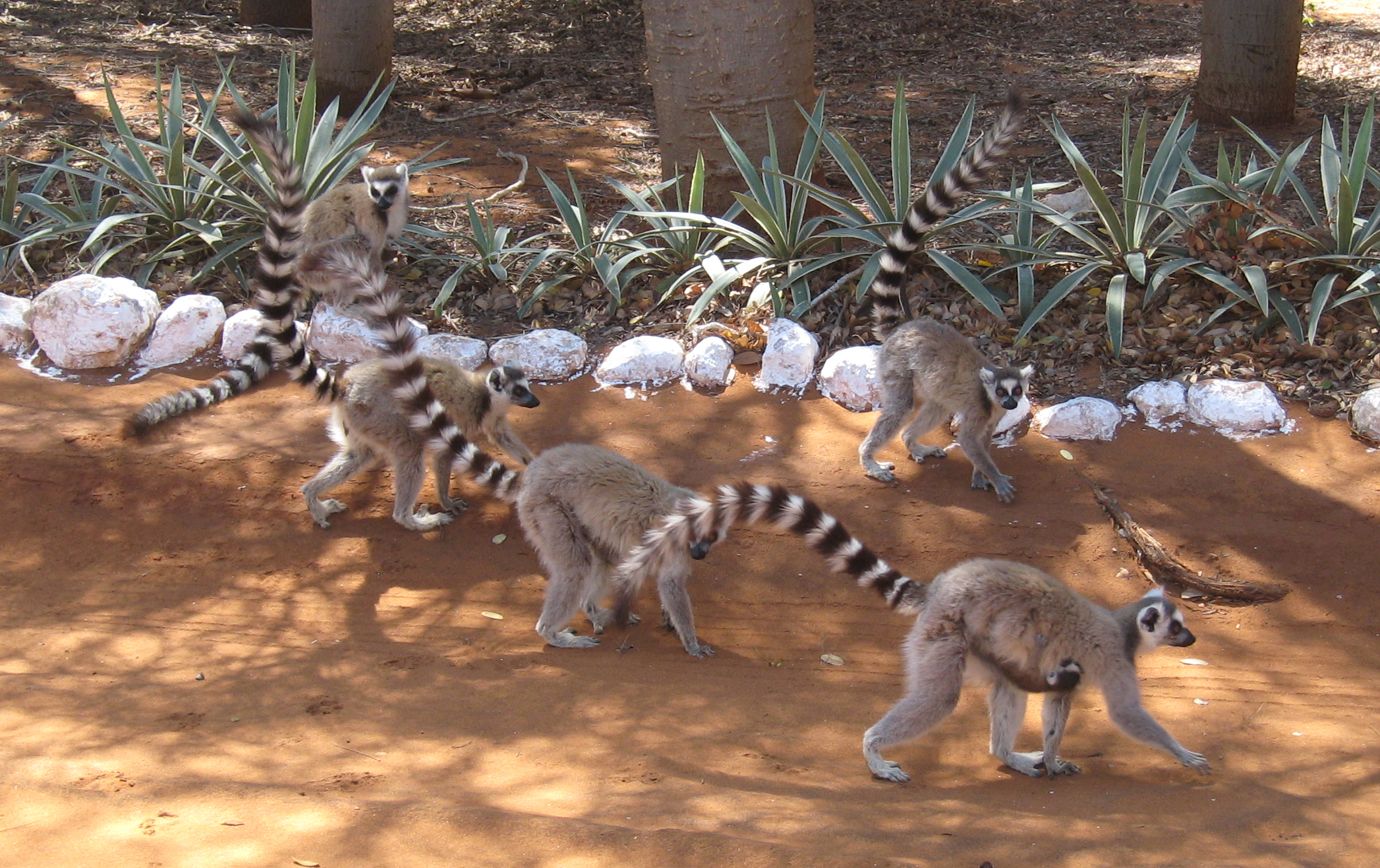
Lemur catta in Berenty Reserve

Berenty Reserve is a small private reserve, near Amboasary Sud, Anosy. It is situated along the Mandrare River, set in the semi-arid spiny forest ecoregion of the far south of Madagascar. For more than three decades the late primatologist Alison Jolly (who started the research at Berenty), other researchers and students have visited Berenty to conduct fieldwork on lemurs. The reserve is also a favourite for visitors who want to see some of Madagascar's endemic bird species, which include owls and couas.

The reserve has accommodation in the forest and a set of forest trails to explore. It attracts the most visitors of any Madagascar nature reserve. It is reached after a two-hour drive from Tôlagnaro on the southeast coast.

List of lemur species found in Berenty Reserve
| Viewing time | Species |
|---|---|
| Daytime | Ring-tailed lemur (Lemur catta); Verreaux's sifaka (Propithecus verreauxi); hybrid Eulemur: E. rufifrons x E. collaris (introduced) |
| Nighttime | White-footed sportive lemur (Lepilemur leucopus); Gray mouse lemur (Microcebus murinus); Reddish-gray mouse lemur (Microcebus griseorufus) |

== See also ==
- List of national parks of Madagascar
- Madagascar spiny thickets ecoregion
