= Amboasary Sud =

Amboasary Sud Amboasary Atsimo
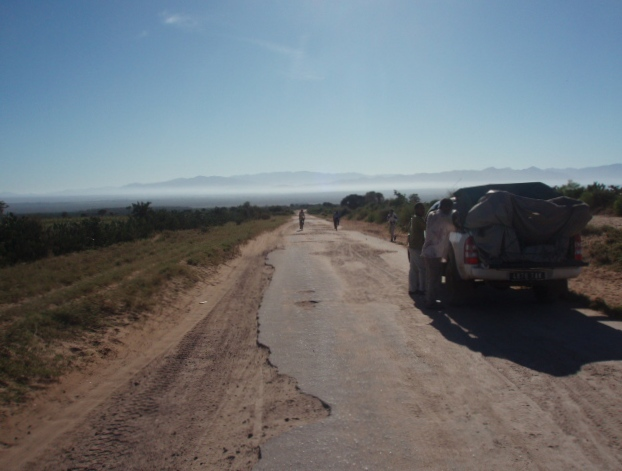
- Near Amboasary Sud

- Location in Madagascar
- Coordinates: 25°3′S 46°23′E
- Country: Madagascar
- Region: Anosy
- District: Amboasary Sud

Government
  - Mayor: Richard Joseph Rakotonirina

Area
  - Total: 248 km^{2} (96 sq mi)
- Elevation: 26 m (85 ft)

Population (2018)
  - Total: 45,989
- Time zone: UTC3 (EAT)
- postal code: 603

Amboasary Sud (Amboasary Atsimo) is a town in Anosy, Madagascar. It is the main town of Amboasary Sud District. It has a population of 45,989 in 2018.

== Geography ==
It is located at the Mandrare River which since 1957 is crossed by a steel bridge of 414m was built, that was designed by Anciens Ets Eiffel. It is situated approximately 75 km from Fort-Dauphin and 35 km from Ambovombe.

== Economy ==
The economy of the town is dominated by sisal plantations and 3 transforming companies.

== Lakes ==
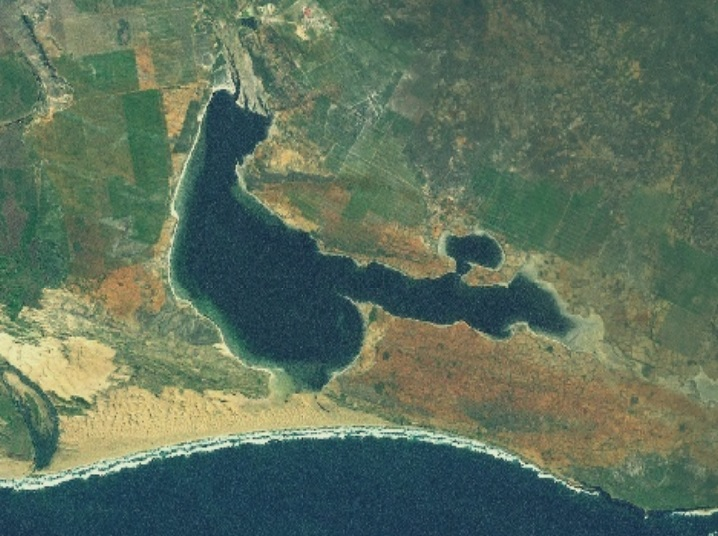
the Anony Lake

The Anony Lake (2 300 ha) at 17 km south from Amboasary Sud and the Ranofotsy Lake (500ha).

== Sports ==
- FC Amboasary Atsimo (regional soccer champion 2011 & 2012)
- ASMO Amboasary (regional soccer champion 2020)

== Points of interest ==
- The privately owned Berenty Reserve is close to Amboasary.
- Bay of Italy (Italy significates Where there is the wind in Malgache language)
- Anony Lake with its flamingoes and the caves called Jurassique Cirque (Jurassic Circus).

== Infrastructures ==
The town is linked to Fort-Dauphin by the National road 13 (73 km).
