= Marolinta =

- Location in Madagascar
- Coordinates: 25°6′S 44°37′E
- Country: Madagascar
- Region: Androy
- District: Beloha
- Elevation: 53 m (174 ft)

Population (2001)
  - Total: 11,000
- Time zone: UTC3 (EAT)

Marolinta is a town and commune in Madagascar. It belongs to the district of Beloha, which is a part of Androy Region.

It is situated in the west of Androy Region at the Menarandra River, near the Hatokaliosky Special Reserve and the Bay of Langarano.

The population of the commune was estimated to be approximately 11,000 in 2001 commune census.

Only primary schooling is available. The majority 50% of the population of the commune are farmers, while an additional 40% receives their livelihood from raising livestock. The most important crop is maize, while other important products are cassava, sweet potatoes and cowpeas. Services provide employment for 5% of the population. Additionally fishing employs 5% of the population.
