= Hatokaliotsy Special Reserve =

Protected area in Madagascar

Hatokaliotsy Site of Biological Interest
- Location within Madagascar
- Location: Atsimo Andrefana
- Nearest city: Itampolo, Androka, Marolinta
- Coordinates: 25°03′15″S 44°28′45″E

The Hatokaliotsy Site of Biological Interest is a site of biological interest in Madagascar located near Marolinta, the Menarandra River and the Bay of Langarano.
