= Tsihombe District =

Tsihombe Tsiombe
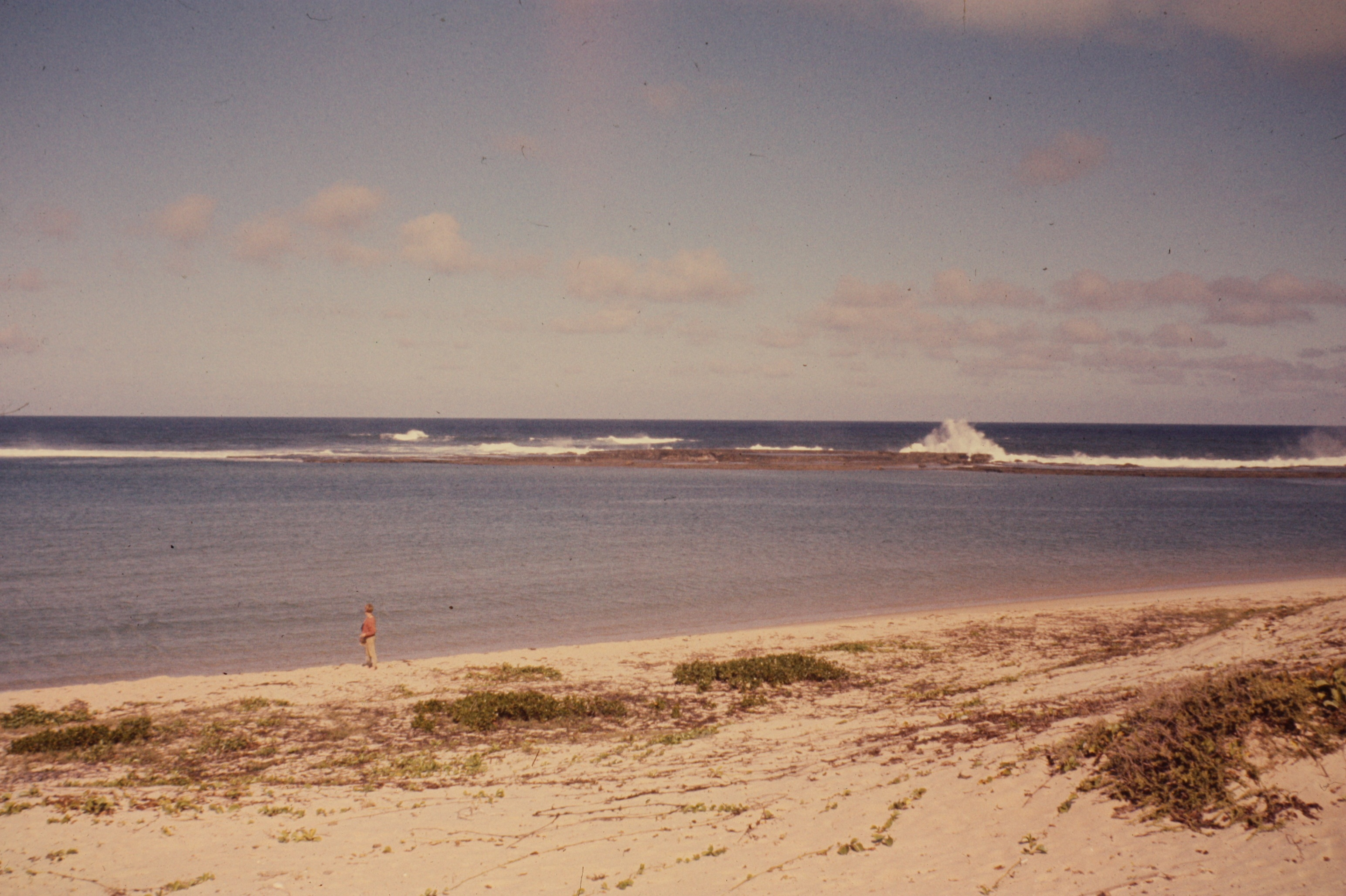
- Faux Cap

- Location in Madagascar
- Coordinates: 25°18′S 45°29′E
- Country: Madagascar
- Region: Androy
- District: Tsihombe

Area
  - Total: 3,316 km^{2} (1,280 sq mi)
- Elevation: 150 m (490 ft)

Population (2020)
  - Total: 158,954
  - Density: 47.94/km^{2} (124.2/sq mi)
- Time zone: UTC3 (EAT)
- Postal code: 621

Tsiombe is a municipality and a district of Androy in Madagascar. The district has an area of 3,316 km^{2} (1,280 sq mi), and the estimated population in 2020 was 158,954. Tsiombe includes the Cape Sainte-Marie, the southernmost point of Madagascar.

== Geography ==
This district is crossed by the Route nationale 10 and the Manambovo river. Tsihombe is located at 65 km west of Ambovombe and 45 km East of Beloha.

The district of Tsiombe includes the Cape Sainte Marie, the southernmost point of Madagascar. At Cape Vohimena (Sainte Marie) there is also a wildlife reserve.

This is the semi-arid region of Madagascar and the population uses to eat cactus fruit and crickets to survive.

A water-pipeline of 225 km is presently under construction if the tubes will not be embezzled.

== Municipalities ==
- Anjapaly
- Antaritarika
- Betanty (Faux Cap)
- Imongy
- Marovato
- Nikoly
- Tsiombe
