= Antanimora Sud =

Antanimora Sud Antanimora Atsimo
- Location in Madagascar
- Coordinates: 24°49′S 45°40′E
- Country: Madagascar
- Region: Androy
- District: Ambovombe
- Elevation: 297 m (974 ft)

Population (2001)
  - Total: 17,000
  - Ethnicities: Antandroy
- Time zone: UTC3 (EAT)

Antanimora Sud (Antanimora Atsimo) is a town and commune in Madagascar. It belongs to the district of Ambovombe-Androy, which is a part of Androy Region.

It is situated at the Route nationale 13, Ihosy to Tolagnaro, at 321 km from Ihosy, 203 km from Betroka, 78 km from Beraketa and 62 km from Ambovombe.

The population of the commune was estimated to be approximately 17,000 in 2001 commune census.

Antanimora Sud is served by a local airport. Primary and junior level secondary education are available in town. The majority 52% of the population of the commune are farmers, while an additional 45% receives their livelihood from raising livestock. The most important crops are cassava and peanuts; also maize is an important agricultural product. Services provide employment for 3% of the population.
