= Belindo =

Belindo may refer to:

- Dennis Belindo (1938–2009), Kiowa-Diné painter, educator, analyst and activist
- Belindo Adolfo Torres (1917–1965), entomologist from Argentina
- Belindo Mahasoa, town and commune in Madagascar
- João Vitor Belindo Gomes (2008), Guaraciaba do Norte
