= Faux Cap =

Faux Cap Betanty
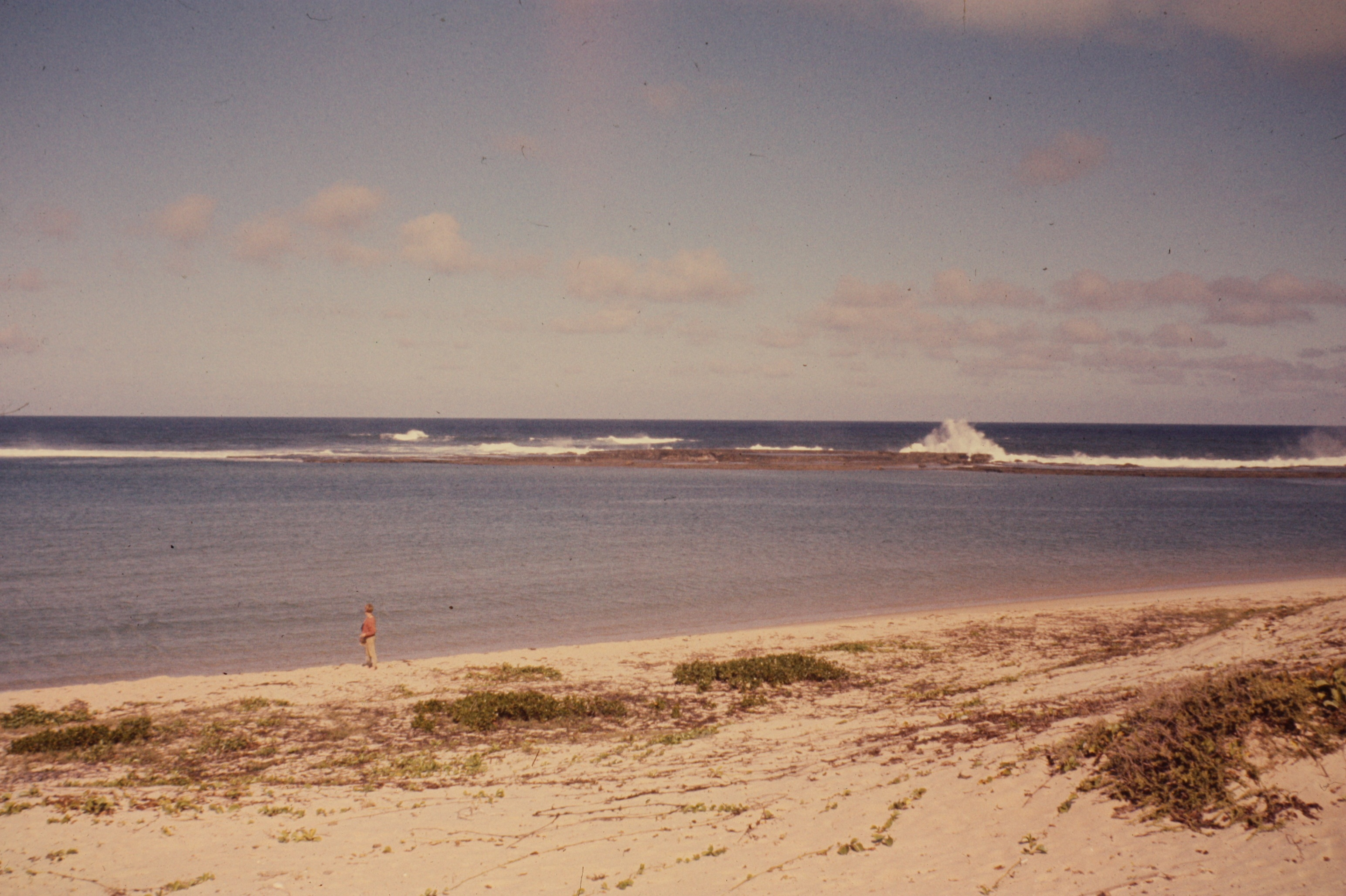
- Faux Cap

- Location in Madagascar
- Coordinates: 25°34′S 45°31′E
- Country: Madagascar
- Region: Androy
- District: Tsiombe
- Elevation: 23 m (75 ft)

Population (2001)
  - Total: 16,000
- Time zone: UTC3 (EAT)

Faux Cap or Betanty is a municipality in Madagascar. It belongs to the district of Tsiombe, which is a part of the Androy Region. The population of the commune was estimated to be approximately 16,000 in the 2001 commune census.

Primary and junior level secondary education are available in the town. Farming and raising livestock provides employment for 36% of the working population. The most important crops are sweet potatoes and cowpeas, while other important agricultural products are maize and cassava. Services provide employment for 2% of the population. Additionally fishing employs 26% of the population.

== Geography ==
Faux Cap is situated in the extreme South of Madagascar, about 30 km South of Tsihombe.
