= Karimbola dialect =

Austronesian language of Madagascar

Karimbola
- Native to: Madagascar
- Ethnicity: Karimbola people
- Native speakers: 182,000
- Language family: Austronesian: Malayo-Polynesian; Western Indonesian; Barito; East Barito; Southern Malagasic; Karimbola
- Writing system: Latin script (Malagasy alphabet)

Language codes
- ISO 639-3: tdx
- Karimbola dialect sample 1 A man from Beloha speaking in Karimbola dialect about why Andry Rajoelina received a high number of votes in Beloha. Karimbola dialect sample 2 A man from Beloha speaking in Karimbola dialect explaining wedding traditions.

Karimbola is a dialect of the Malagasy language spoken by the Karimbola people in southern Madagascar.

== Classification ==
Karimbola belongs to the Austronesian language family, specifically the Southern Malagasic subgroup. It shares similarities with other dialects like Antandroy and Mahafaly.

== Geographic distribution ==
The Karimbola dialect is spoken in the district of Beloha in the Androy region of southern Madagascar.
