= Tranoroa =

- Location in Madagascar
- Coordinates: 24°42′S 45°4′E
- Country: Madagascar
- Region: Androy
- District: Beloha
- Elevation: 214 m (702 ft)

Population (2001)
  - Total: 18,000
- Time zone: UTC3 (EAT)
- Postal code: 609

Tranoroa is a rural municipality in Madagascar. It belongs to the district of Beloha, which is a part of Androy Region. It is situated at the Menarandra River and the National road 10. The population of the commune was estimated to be approximately 18,000 in 2001.

Primary and junior level secondary education are available in town. It is also a site of industrial-scale mining. Farming and raising livestock provides employment for 45% and 45% of the working population. The most important crops are maize and peanuts; also cassava is an important agricultural product. Industry and services provide employment for 2% and 8% of the population, respectively.

== Animals ==
The gecko Paroedura guibeae and the moth Malgassoclanis delicatus where described from specimen collected in Tranoroa.

== Galeria ==
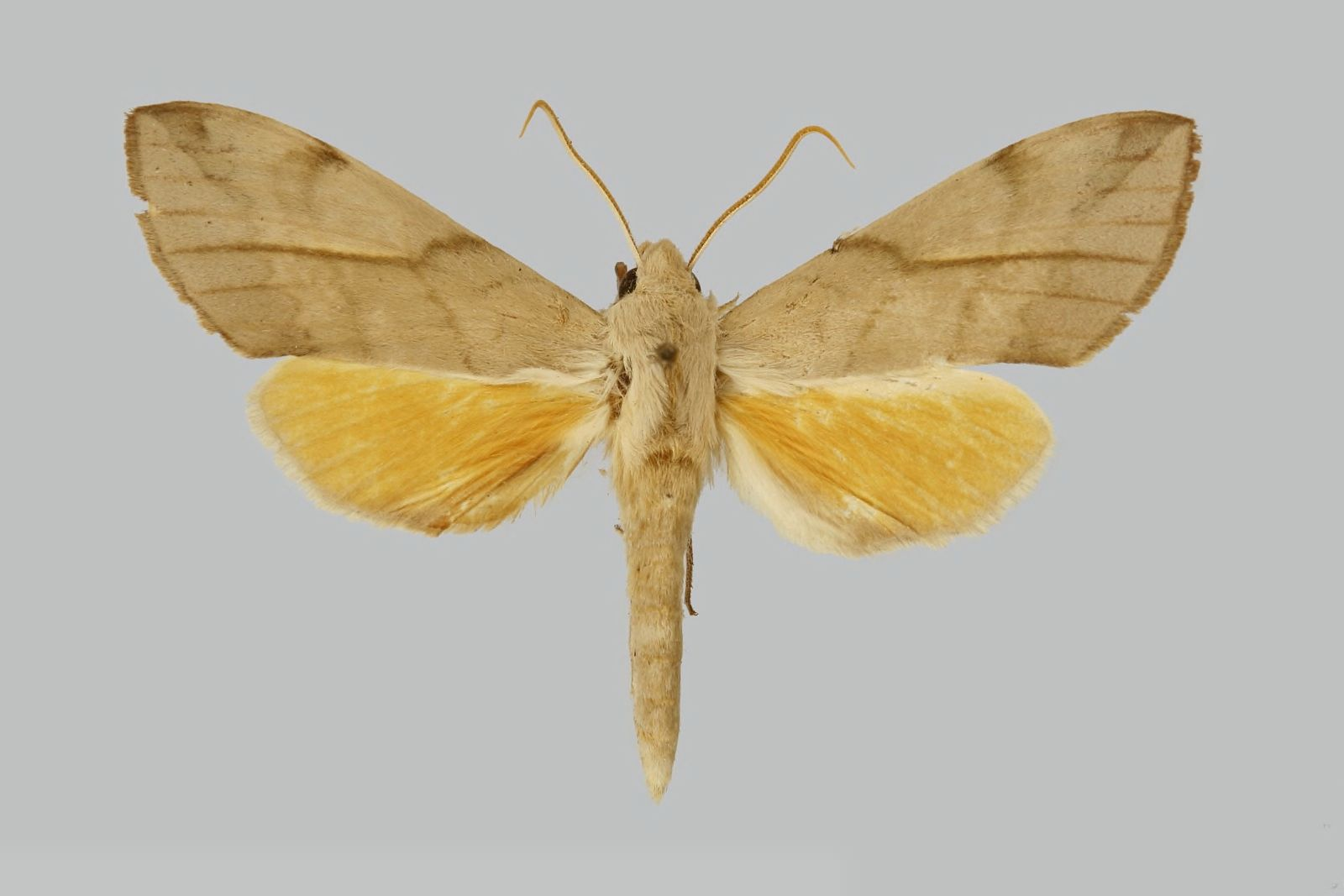
The Sphingidae Malgassoclanis delicatus

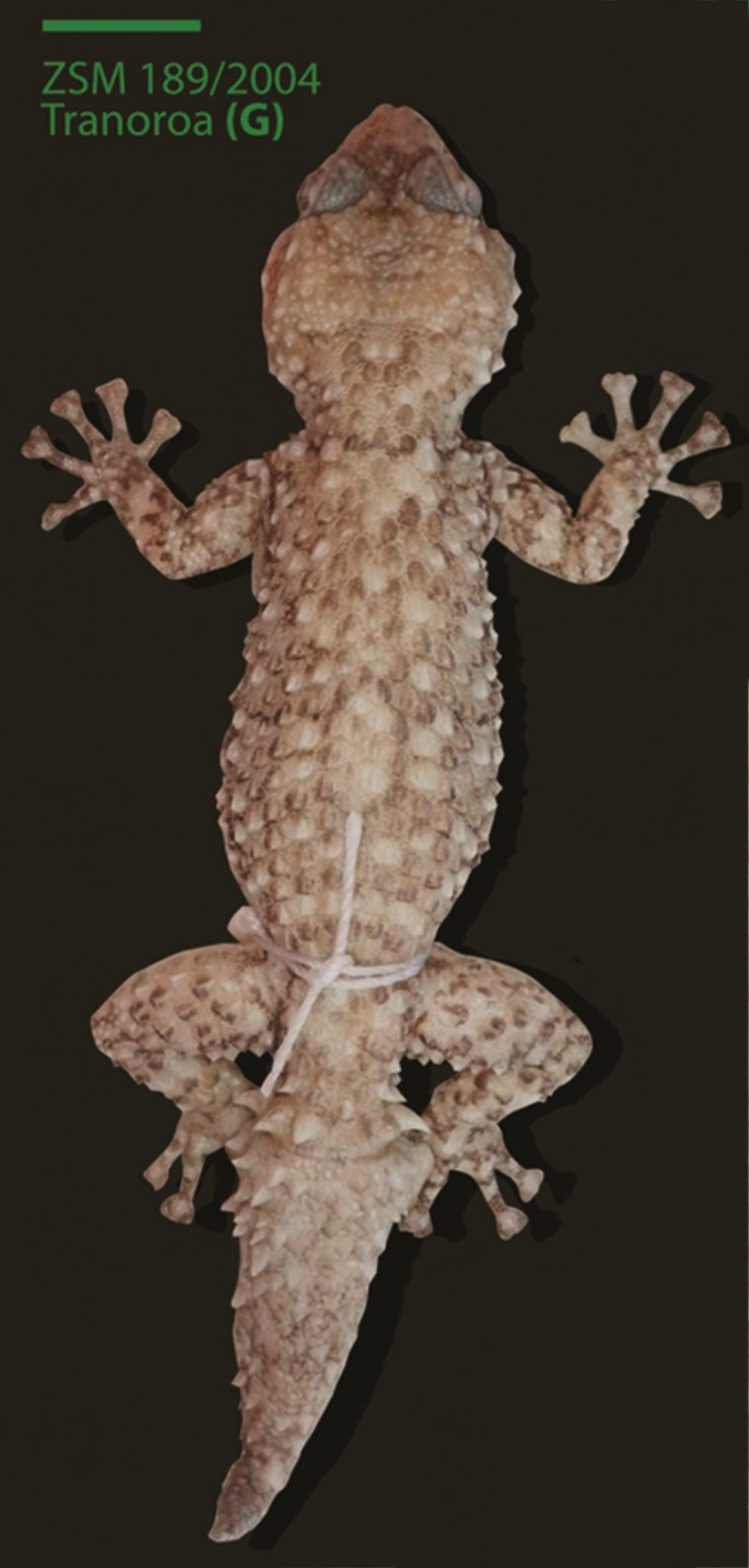
The gecko Paroedura guibeae

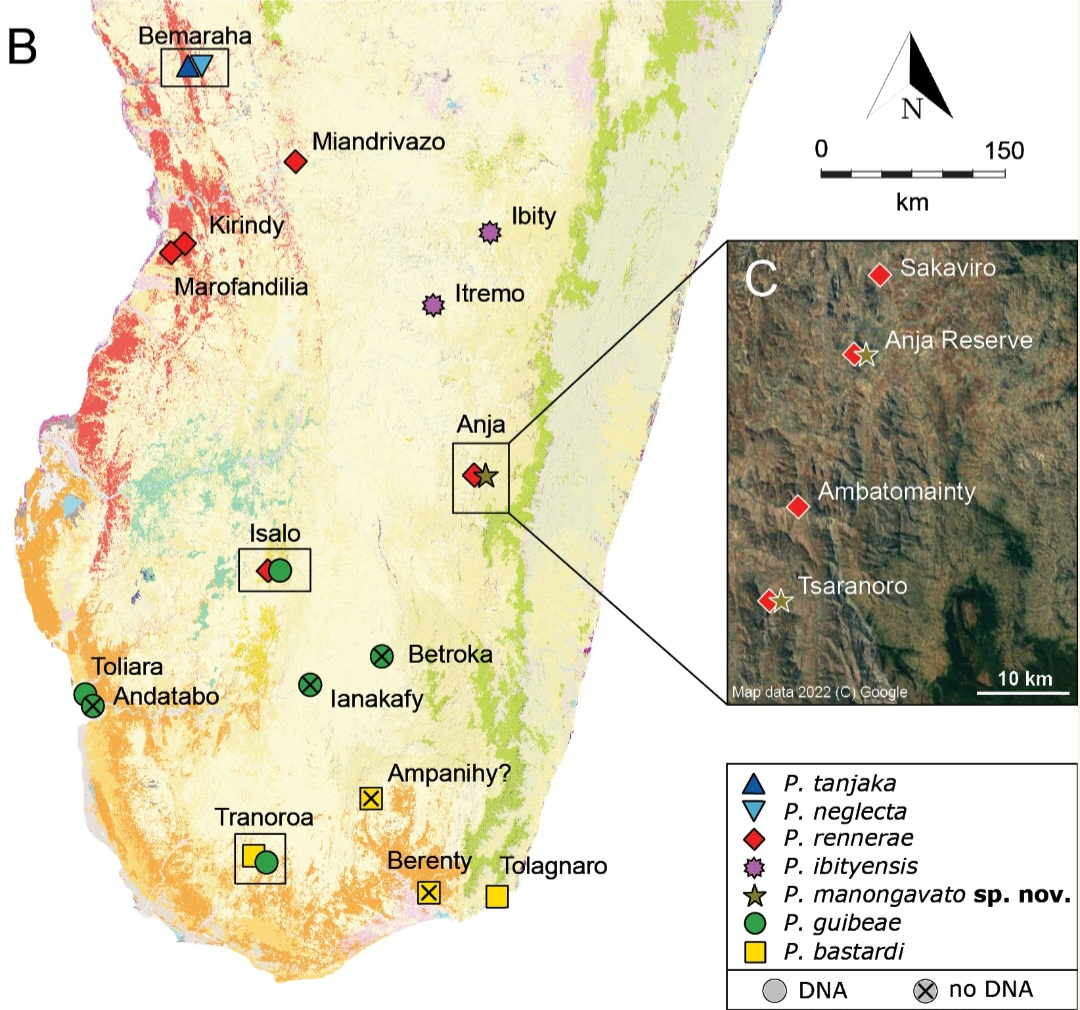
a map with it's location
