= Ambazoa =

- Location in Madagascar
- Coordinates: 25°18′50″S 45°53′50″E
- Country: Madagascar
- Region: Androy
- District: Ambovombe

Government
  - Mayor: Célestin Manasoa
- Elevation: 144 m (472 ft)

Population (2001)
  - Total: 13,000
- Time zone: UTC3 (EAT)

Ambazoa is a rural municipality in Madagascar. It belongs to the district of Ambovombe, which is a part of Androy Region. It is located to the southeast of Ambondro; the main settlement is not far from the coast. The population of the commune was estimated to be approximately 13,000 in 2001 commune census.

Only primary schooling is available. Farming and raising livestock provides employment for 38% and 35% of the working population. The most important crops are maize and cowpeas, while other important agricultural products are other peas, cassava and sweet potatoes. Services provide employment for 2% of the population. Additionally fishing employs 25% of the population.
