= Andalatanosy =

- Location in Madagascar
- Coordinates: 24°40′S 45°36′E
- Country: Madagascar
- Region: Androy
- District: Ambovombe
- Elevation: 441 m (1,447 ft)

Population (2001)
  - Total: 23,000
- Time zone: UTC3 (EAT)

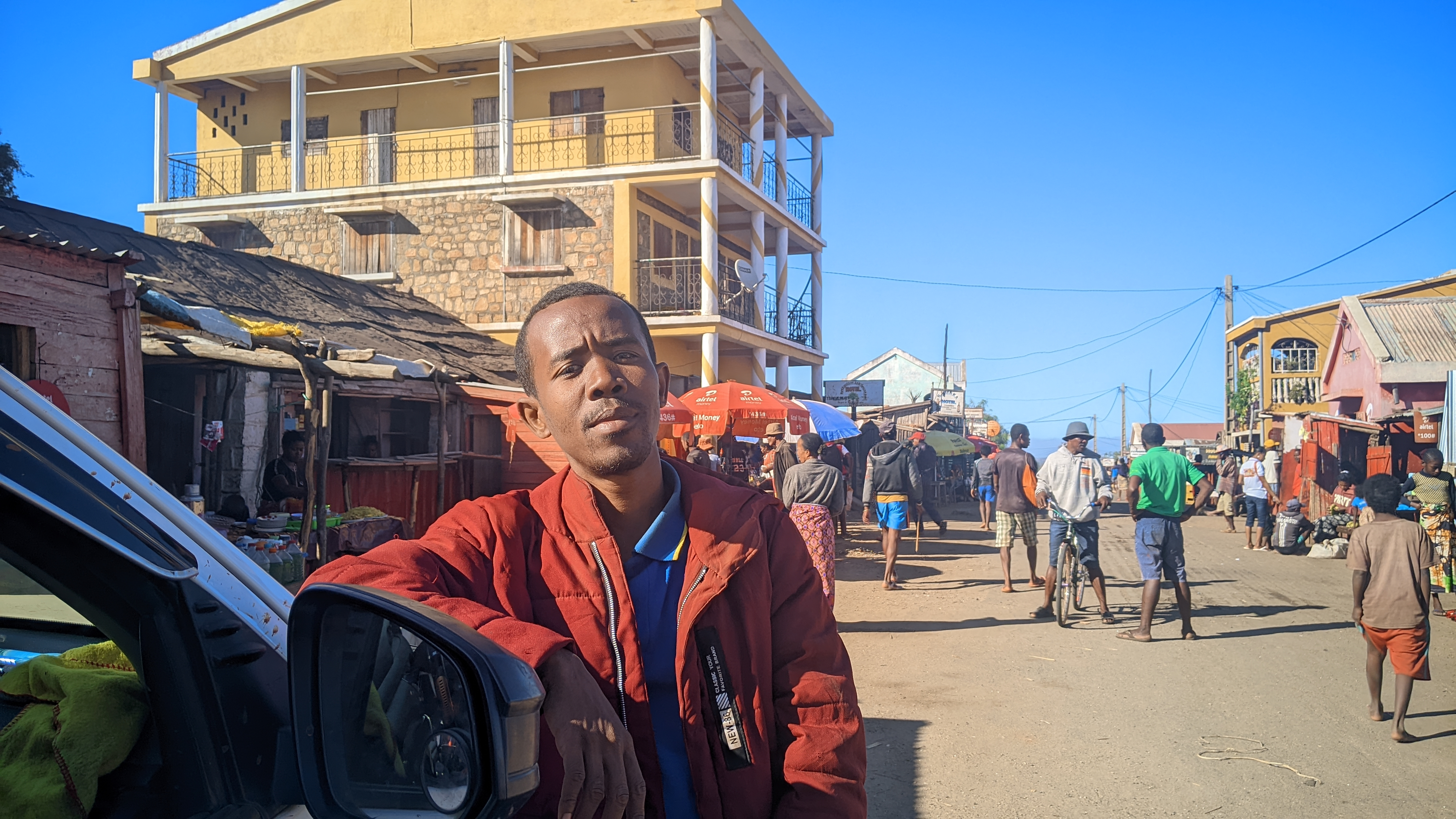
Andalatanosy

Andalatanosy is a town and commune in Madagascar. It belongs to the district of Ambovombe, which is a part of Androy Region. The population of the commune was estimated to be approximately 23,000 in 2001 commune census.

Only primary schooling is available. The majority 50% of the population of the commune are farmers, while an additional 49% receives their livelihood from raising livestock. The most important crop are peanuts, while other important products are maize, cassava, sweet potatoes and cowpeas. Services provide employment for 1% of the population.
