= Tanambao Tsirandrana =

- Location in Madagascar
- Coordinates: 24°14′S 45°33′E
- Country: Madagascar
- Region: Androy
- District: Bekily
- Elevation: 459 m (1,506 ft)

Population (2001)
  - Total: 2,000
- Time zone: UTC3 (EAT)

Tanambao Tsirandrana is a town and commune in Madagascar. It belongs to the district of Bekily, which is a part of Androy Region. The population of the commune was estimated to be approximately 2,000 in 2001 commune census.

Only primary schooling is available. The majority 80% of the population of the commune are farmers, while an additional 20% receives their livelihood from raising livestock. The most important crops are rice and peanuts; also cassava is an important agricultural product.
