= Ambanisarike =

- Location in Madagascar
- Coordinates: 24°57′S 45°59′E
- Country: Madagascar
- Region: Androy
- District: Ambovombe
- Elevation: 147 m (482 ft)

Population (2001)
  - Total: 8,000
- Time zone: UTC3 (EAT)

Ambanisarike is a town and commune in Madagascar. It belongs to the district of Ambovombe, which is a part of Androy Region. The population of the commune was estimated to be approximately 8,000 in 2001 commune census.

Only primary schooling is available. Farming and raising livestock provides employment for 48% and 48% of the working population. The most important crops are sweet potatoes and maize, while other important agricultural products are cassava and cowpeas. Services provide employment for 4% of the population.
