= Maroalopoty =

- Interactive map of Maroalopoty
- Country: Madagascar
- Region: Androy
- District: Ambovombe

Population (2001)
  - Total: 16,000
- Time zone: UTC3 (EAT)

Maroalopoty is a town and commune in Madagascar. It belongs to the district of Ambovombe, which is a part of Androy Region. The population of the commune was estimated to be approximately 16,000 in 2001 commune census.

Only primary schooling is available. The majority 50% of the population of the commune are farmers, while an additional 34% receives their livelihood from raising livestock. The most important crops are cassava and cowpeas, while other important agricultural products are other peas, maize and sweet potatoes. Services provide employment for 1% of the population. Additionally fishing employs 15% of the population.

== Famine ==
The Economist September 4, 2021 published a comprehensive article about the region and the famine that is currently raging in the country (as of 2021). According to the United Nations in October 2021, Children under five are among the most affected by malnutrition in southern Madagascar. More than one million people in southern Madagascar are struggling to get enough to eat, due to what could become the first famine caused by climate change. This was found out through an interview that the United Nations did with Alice Rahmoun, Communications Officer in the capital, Antananarivo for the World Food Programme. According to the Action against Hunger Organisation, 135,476 children under five years old suffering from acute malnutrition in Madagascar. The years-long drought has created urgent water, sanitation, and hygiene needs: just 30% of the populations has access to drinking water services.
