= Jules Androkae =

Malagasy politician

Jules Androkae (born July 12, 1964, in Bekitro) is a Malagasy politician. He is a member of the Senate of Madagascar for Androy, and is a member of the Tiako i Madagasikara party.
