= Marovato, Tsiombe =

Marovato
- Location in Madagascar
- Coordinates: 25°32′S 45°16′E
- Country: Madagascar
- Region: Androy
- District: Tsiombe
- Elevation: 199 m (653 ft)

Population (2001)
  - Total: 13,000
- Time zone: UTC3 (EAT)
- Postal code: 621

Marovato is a town and commune in Madagascar. It belongs to the district of Tsiombe, which is a part of Androy Region. The population of the commune was estimated to be approximately 13,000 in 2001 commune census.

Primary and junior level secondary education are available in town. Farming and raising livestock provides employment for 48% and 40% of the working population. The most important crops are maize and lentils, while other important agricultural products are beans and sweet potatoes. Services provide employment for 2% of the population. Additionally fishing employs 10% of the population.
