= Anivorano Mitsinjo =

- Location in Madagascar
- Coordinates: 24°24′S 45°39′E
- Country: Madagascar
- Region: Androy
- District: Bekily
- Elevation: 470 m (1,540 ft)

Population (2001)
  - Total: 1,000
- Time zone: UTC3 (EAT)

Anivorano Mitsinjo is a town and commune in Madagascar. It belongs to the district of Bekily, which is a part of Androy Region. The population of the commune was estimated to be approximately 1,000 in 2001 commune census.

Only primary schooling is available. The majority 80% of the population of the commune are farmers, while an additional 19% receives their livelihood from raising livestock. The most important crop is peanuts, while other important products are maize and cassava. Services provide employment for 0.5% of the population. Additionally fishing employs 0.5% of the population.
