= Vohimanga =

- Location in Madagascar
- Coordinates: 24°3′S 45°34′E
- Country: Madagascar
- Region: Androy
- District: Bekily
- Elevation: 565 m (1,854 ft)

Population (2001)
  - Total: 9,000
- Time zone: UTC3 (EAT)

Vohimanga is a town and commune in Madagascar. It belongs to the Bekily District, which is a part of Androy Region. The population of the commune was estimated to be approximately 9,000 according to the 2001 commune census.

Only primary schooling is available. The entire population of the commune are farmers. The most important crops are cassava and rice; also peanuts are an important agricultural product.
