= Antsakoamaro =

- Location in Madagascar
- Coordinates: 24°15′S 45°11′E
- Country: Madagascar
- Region: Androy
- District: Bekily
- Elevation: 437 m (1,434 ft)

Population (2001)
  - Total: 5,000
- Time zone: UTC3 (EAT)

Antsakoamaro is a town and commune in Madagascar. It belongs to the district of Bekily, which is a part of Androy Region. The population of the commune was estimated to be approximately 5,000 in 2001 commune census.

Only primary schooling is available. The majority 90% of the population of the commune are farmers, while an additional 9.5% receives their livelihood from raising livestock. The most important crop is peanuts, while other important products are cassava and rice. Services provide employment for 0.5% of the population.
