= Mahasoa (disambiguation) =

Mahasoa may refer to several places in Madagascar:

- Mahasoa, a municipality in Ihorombe (Ihosy District)
- Mahasoa Est, also known as Mahasoa Atsinanana, a municipality in Anosy
- Mahasoa Antindra, a municipality in Sava Region
- Mahasoabe, a municipality in Ihorombe
