= Marovato Befeno =

- Location in Madagascar
- Coordinates: 25°8′S 45°41′E
- Country: Madagascar
- Region: Androy
- District: Ambovombe
- Elevation: 211 m (692 ft)

Population (2001)
  - Total: 60,000
- Time zone: UTC3 (EAT)

Marovato Befeno is a town and commune in Madagascar. It belongs to the district of Ambovombe, which is a part of Androy Region. The population of the commune was estimated to be approximately 60,000 in 2001 commune census.

Only primary schooling is available. The majority 70% of the population of the commune are farmers, while an additional 28% receives their livelihood from raising livestock. The most important crops are cassava and peanuts, while other important agricultural products are maize, cowpeas and bambara groundnut. Services provide employment for 2% of the population.
