= Manakompy =

- Location in Madagascar
- Coordinates: 24°18′S 45°23′E
- Country: Madagascar
- Region: Androy
- District: Bekily
- Elevation: 396 m (1,299 ft)

Population (2001)
  - Total: 5,000
- Time zone: UTC3 (EAT)

Manakompy is a town and commune in Madagascar. It belongs to the district of Bekily, which is a part of Androy Region. The population of the commune was estimated to be approximately 5,000 in 2001 commune census.

Only primary schooling is available. The majority 99.9% of the population of the commune are farmers. The most important crops are rice and peanuts, while other important agricultural products are maize, cassava and sweet potatoes. Services provide employment for 0.1% of the population.
