= Longin Louis Fanantera =

Malagasy politician

Longin Louis Fanantera is a Malagasy politician. He was a member of the National Assembly of Madagascar. He was elected as a member of the Tiako I Madagasikara party in the 2007 Malagasy parliamentary elections and in 2013. He represented the constituency of Beloha.
