= Jafaro =

- Location in Madagascar
- Coordinates: 24°55′S 45°31′E
- Country: Madagascar
- Region: Androy
- District: Ambovombe
- Elevation: 225 m (738 ft)

Population (2001)
  - Total: 22,000
- Time zone: UTC3 (EAT)

Jafaro is a town and commune in Madagascar. It belongs to the district of Ambovombe, which is a part of Androy Region. The population of the commune was estimated to be approximately 22,000 in 2001 commune census.

Only primary schooling is available. The majority 60% of the population of the commune are farmers, while an additional 37% receives their livelihood from raising livestock. The most important crops are maize and tobacco, while other important agricultural products are peanuts and cassava. Services provide employment for 3% of the population.
