= Tanandava, Bekily =

Tanandava
- Location in Madagascar
- Coordinates: 24°19′S 45°33′E
- Country: Madagascar
- Region: Androy
- District: Bekily

Area
  - Total: 400 km^{2} (150 sq mi)
- Elevation: 458 m (1,503 ft)

Population (2001)
  - Total: 7,000
- Time zone: UTC3 (EAT)
- Postal code: 607

Tanandava (also Antanandava) is a rural municipality in Madagascar. It belongs to the district of Bekily, which is a part of Androy Region. The population of the commune was estimated to be approximately 7,000 in 2001 commune census.

Only primary schooling is available. The majority 99.99% of the population of the commune are farmers. The most important crops are rice and peanuts; also cassava is an important agricultural product. Services provide employment for 0.01% of the population.
