= Ianabinda =

- Location in Madagascar
- Coordinates: 23°30′S 45°57′E
- Country: Madagascar
- Region: Anosy
- District: Betroka
- Elevation: 776 m (2,546 ft)

Population (2001)
  - Total: 7,000
- Time zone: UTC3 (EAT)

Ianabinda is a town and commune in Madagascar. It belongs to the district of Betroka, which is a part of Anosy Region.

It is situated at the Route nationale 13, Ihosy to Tolagnaro, at 48 km from Beraketa.

The population of the commune was estimated to be approximately 7,000 in 2001 commune census.

Only primary schooling is available. It is also a site of industrial-scale mining. Farming and raising livestock provides employment for 48% and 50% of the working population. The most important crop is rice, while other important products are peanuts and cassava. Services provide employment for 2% of the population.
