= Maroviro =

Coordinates: 21°14′S 44°44′E

- Interactive map of Maroviro
- Country: Madagascar
- Region: Androy
- District: Bekily

Population (2001)
  - Total: 13,000
- Time zone: UTC3 (EAT)

Maroviro is a town and commune in Madagascar. It belongs to the district of Bekily, which is a part of Androy Region. The population of the commune was estimated to be approximately 13,000 in a 2001 commune census.

Only primary schooling is available. The majority 99% of the population of the commune are farmers, while an additional 0.9% receives their livelihood from raising livestock. The most important crop is rice, while other important products are peanuts and cassava. Services provide employment for 0.1% of the population.
