= Sihanamaro =

- Location in Madagascar
- Coordinates: 25°11′S 45°46′E
- Country: Madagascar
- Region: Androy
- District: Ambovombe
- Elevation: 208 m (682 ft)

Population (2001)
  - Total: 10,000
- Time zone: UTC3 (EAT)

Sihanamaro is a town and commune in Madagascar. It belongs to the district of Ambovombe, which is a part of Androy Region. The population of the commune was estimated to be approximately 10,000 in 2001 commune census.

Only primary schooling is available. The majority 50% of the population of the commune are farmers, while an additional 49% receives their livelihood from raising livestock. The most important crops are cassava and cowpeas, while other important agricultural products are maize, sweet potatoes and bambara groundnut. Services provide employment for 1% of the population.
