= Bernard Tolia =

Malagasy politician

Bernard Tolia is a Malagasy politician. A member of the National Assembly of Madagascar, he was elected as a member of the Tiako I Madagasikara party; he represents the constituency of Tsihombe.

He had also been the mayor of Anjapaly.
