= Fabergé Gabriel Mamitiana =

Malagasy politician

Fabergé Gabriel Mamitiana is a Malagasy politician. He had been a member of the National Assembly of Madagascar, he was elected as a member of the Tiako I Madagasikara party; he represents the constituency of Bekily.

He was elected senator of Madagascar in 2016 on the list of HVM.
