= Bevitiky =

- Location in Madagascar
- Coordinates: 24°36′S 45°23′E
- Country: Madagascar
- Region: Androy
- District: Bekily
- Elevation: 340 m (1,120 ft)

Population (2001)
  - Total: 4,000
- Time zone: UTC3 (EAT)
- Postal code: 607

Bevitiky is a town and commune in Madagascar. It belongs to the district of Bekily, which is a part of Androy Region. The population of the commune was estimated to be approximately 4,000 in 2001 commune census.

Only primary schooling is available. It is also a site of industrial-scale mining. The majority 80% of the population of the commune are farmers, while an additional 18% receives their livelihood from raising livestock. The most important crops are cassava and peanuts; also maize is an important agricultural product. Industry and services provide both employment for 0.5% of the population. Additionally fishing employs 1% of the population.
