= Ambahita =

- Location in Madagascar
- Coordinates: 24°0′S 45°16′E
- Country: Madagascar
- Region: Androy
- District: Bekily
- Elevation: 496 m (1,627 ft)

Population (2001)
  - Total: 14,000
- Time zone: UTC3 (EAT)
- Climate: Aw

Ambahita is a town and commune in Madagascar. It belongs to the district of Bekily, which is a part of Androy Region. The population of the commune was estimated to be approximately 14,000 in 2001 commune census.

Only primary schooling is available. The majority 90% of the population of the commune are farmers. The most important crops are rice and sugarcane, while other important agricultural products are peanuts and cassava. Industry and services provide employment for 8% and 2% of the population, respectively.
