= Ambatosola =

- Location in Madagascar
- Coordinates: 24°3′S 45°27′E
- Country: Madagascar
- Region: Androy
- District: Bekily
- Elevation: 492 m (1,614 ft)

Population (2001)
  - Total: 8,000
- Time zone: UTC3 (EAT)

Ambatosola is a town and commune in Madagascar. It belongs to the district of Bekily, which is a part of Androy Region. The population of the commune was estimated to be approximately 8,000 in 2001 commune census.

The majority 83% of the population of the commune are farmers, while an additional 16.5% receives their livelihood from raising livestock. The most important crops are rice and peanuts; also cassava is an important agricultural product. Services provide employment for 0.5% of the population.
