= Ankaranabo Nord =

- Location in Madagascar
- Coordinates: 24°11′S 45°17′E
- Country: Madagascar
- Region: Androy
- District: Bekily
- Elevation: 411 m (1,348 ft)

Population (2001)
  - Total: ~5,000
- Time zone: UTC3 (EAT)

Ankaranabo Nord is a town and commune in Madagascar. It belongs to the district of Bekily, which is a part of Androy Region. The population of the commune was estimated to be approximately 5,000 in 2001 commune census.

Only primary schooling is available. The majority 80% of the population of the commune are farmers, while an additional 19% receives their livelihood from raising livestock. The most important crop is cassava, while other important products are peanuts and rice. Services provide employment for 1% of the population.
