= Erada =

- Location in Madagascar
- Coordinates: 25°17′S 45°56′E
- Country: Madagascar
- Region: Androy
- District: Ambovombe
- Elevation: 152 m (499 ft)

Population (2001)
  - Total: 10,000
- Time zone: UTC3 (EAT)

Erada is a town and commune in Madagascar. It belongs to the district of Ambovombe, which is a part of Androy Region. The population of the commune was estimated to be approximately 10,000 in 2001 commune census.

Only primary schooling is available. Farming and raising livestock provides employment for 47% and 35% of the working population. The most important crops are sweet potatoes and maize, while other important agricultural products are peanuts, cassava and cowpeas. Services provide employment for 1% of the population. Additionally fishing employs 17% of the population.
