= Antaritarika =

- Location in Madagascar
- Coordinates: 25°24′S 45°45′E
- Country: Madagascar
- Region: Androy
- District: Tsiombe
- Elevation: 138 m (453 ft)

Population (2001)
  - Total: 12,000
- Time zone: UTC3 (EAT)

Antaritarika is a town and commune in Madagascar. It belongs to the district of Tsiombe, which is a part of Androy Region. The population of the commune was estimated to be approximately 12,000 in 2001 commune census.

Primary and junior level secondary education are available in town. The majority 50% of the population of the commune are farmers, while an additional 38% receives their livelihood from raising livestock. The most important crops are maize and cowpeas, while other important agricultural products are peanuts and sweet potatoes. Services provide employment for 2% of the population. Additionally fishing employs 10% of the population.
