= Maroalomainty =

- Location in Madagascar
- Coordinates: 25°10′S 46°12′E
- Country: Madagascar
- Region: Androy
- District: Ambovombe
- Elevation: 210 m (690 ft)

Population (2001)
  - Total: 18,000
- Time zone: UTC3 (EAT)

Maroalomainty is a town and commune in Madagascar. It belongs to the district of Ambovombe, which is a part of Androy Region. The population of the commune was estimated to be approximately 18,000 in 2001 commune census.

Only primary schooling is available. Farming and raising livestock provides employment for 45% and 37% of the working population. The most important crops are maize and cowpeas, while other important agricultural products are peanuts, cassava and sweet potatoes. Services provide employment for 3% of the population. Additionally fishing employs 15% of the population.
