= Imongy =

- Location in Madagascar
- Coordinates: 25°19′S 45°44′E
- Country: Madagascar
- Region: Androy
- District: Tsiombe
- Elevation: 95 m (312 ft)

Population (2001)
  - Total: 8,000
- Time zone: UTC3 (EAT)

Imongy is a town and commune in Madagascar. It belongs to the district of Tsiombe, which is a part of Androy Region. The population of the commune was estimated to be approximately 8,000 in 2001 commune census.

Only primary schooling is available. The majority 64% of the population of the commune are farmers, while an additional 30% receives their livelihood from raising livestock. The most important crops are sweet potatoes and cowpeas, while other important agricultural products are maize, cassava and bambara groundnut. Services provide employment for 6% of the population.
