= Tranovaho =

- Location in Madagascar
- Coordinates: 25°18′S 44°58′E
- Country: Madagascar
- Region: Androy
- District: Beloha
- Elevation: 177 m (581 ft)

Population (2001)
  - Total: 13,000
- Time zone: UTC3 (EAT)

Tranovaho is a town and commune in Madagascar. It belongs to the district of Beloha, which is a part of Androy Region. The population of the commune was estimated to be approximately 13,000 in 2001 commune census.

Only primary schooling is available. The majority 60% of the population of the commune are farmers, while an additional 20% receives their livelihood from raising livestock. The most important crop is cassava, while other important products are maize and cowpeas. Services provide employment for 5% of the population. Additionally fishing employs 15% of the population.
