= Anjeky Ankilikira =

- Location in Madagascar
- Coordinates: 25°7′S 46°13′E
- Country: Madagascar
- Region: Androy
- District: Ambovombe
- Elevation: 258 m (846 ft)

Population (2001)
  - Total: 10,000
- Time zone: UTC3 (EAT)

Anjeky Ankilikira is a town and commune in Madagascar. It belongs to the district of Ambovombe, which is a part of Androy Region. The population of the commune was estimated to be approximately 10,000 in 2001 commune census.

Only primary schooling is available. Farming and raising livestock provides employment for 49% and 49% of the working population. The most important crops are maize and cassava, while other important agricultural products are sweet potatoes and cowpeas. Services provide employment for 2% of the population.
