= Imanombo =

- Location in Madagascar
- Coordinates: 24°26′S 45°49′E
- Country: Madagascar
- Region: Androy
- District: Ambovombe
- Elevation: 313 m (1,027 ft)

Population (2001)
  - Total: 15,000
  - Ethnicities: Antandroy
- Time zone: UTC3 (EAT)

Imanombo is a town and commune in Madagascar. It belongs to the district of Ambovombe, which is a part of Androy Region. The population of the commune was estimated to be approximately 15,000 in 2001 commune census.

Only primary schooling is available. Farming and raising livestock provides employment for 49% and 49% of the working population. The most important crops are cassava and rice, while other important agricultural products are peanuts and maize. Services provide employment for 2% of the population.
