= Ambohimalaza =

Ambohimalaza may refer to one of the following locations in Madagascar:

- Ambohimalaza, Ambovombe, in Ambovombe District, Androy Region
- Ambohimalaza, Sambava, in Sambava District, Sava Region

== See also ==
- Ambohimalaza Miray, in Antananarivo Avaradrano District, Analamanga Region
