= Anja Nord =

- Location in Madagascar
- Coordinates: 24°15′S 45°16′E
- Country: Madagascar
- Region: Androy
- District: Bekily
- Elevation: 401 m (1,316 ft)

Population (2001)
  - Total: 1,000
- Time zone: UTC3 (EAT)

Anja Nord is a town and commune in Madagascar. It belongs to the district of Bekily, which is a part of Androy Region. The population of the commune was estimated to be approximately 1,000 in 2001 commune census.

Only primary schooling is available. The majority 80% of the population of the commune are farmers, while an additional 19.5% receives their livelihood from raising livestock. The most important crops are cassava and peanuts, while other important agricultural products are rice and cowpeas. Services provide employment for 0.5% of the population.
