= Efiaimbalo =

Malagasy sculptor

- Born: 1925 (age 100–101); Androka, Madagascar
- Died: 2006
- Occupation: Sculptor

Efiaimbalo (c. 1925 – 2006) was a Malagasy sculptor.

Efiaimbalo was born in Androka, where he lived and worked. A member of the Mahafaly people, he carved aloalos, stele grave markers. He incorporated modern status symbols, such as aircraft and cars, into his designs of more traditional elements and native hardwood. His work is in the collection of Jean Pigozzi.
