= Ambovombe District =

Coordinates: 25.177°S 46.087°E

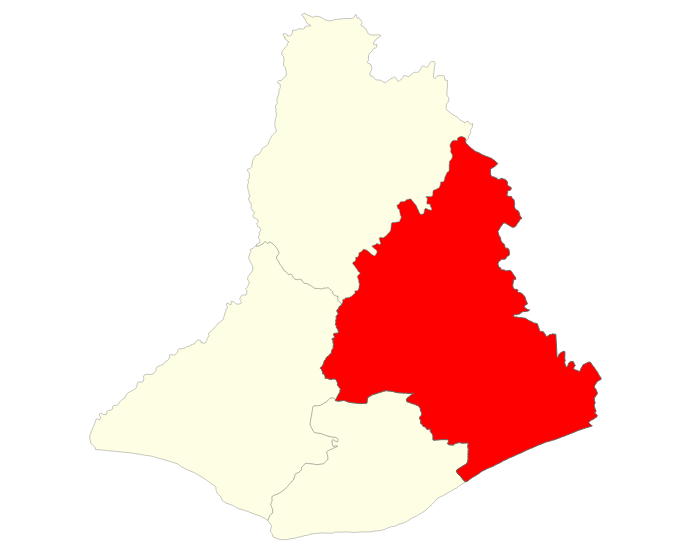

Ambovombe District or Ambovombe-Androy District is a district in the Androy Region, located in southeastern Madagascar. Ambovombe-Androy is a district of Androy in Madagascar.

== Communes ==
The district is further divided into 21 communes:

- Ambanisarike
- Ambazoa
- Ambinany
- Ambohimalaza
- Ambonaivo
- Ambondro
- Ambovombe
- Ampamata
- Andalatanosy
- Andraivo
- Anjeky Ankilikira
- Antanimora Sud
- Befeno
- Imanombo
- Erada
- Jafaro
- Maroalomainty
- Maroalopoty
- Marovato Befeno
- Sihanamaro

== Creation of the Antanimora Sud district ==
In February 2023 9 villages have asked for the creation of another district: the municipalities of Ampamata, Ambinany, Andraivo, Antanimora Sud, Andalatanosy, Befeno, Imanombo, Jafaro and Sihanamaro.
