= Ambatomivary =

- Location in Madagascar
- Coordinates: 23°50′S 45°34′E
- Country: Madagascar
- Region: Anosy
- District: Betroka
- Elevation: 619 m (2,031 ft)

Population (2001)
  - Total: 10,000
- Time zone: UTC3 (EAT)

Ambatomivary is a town and commune in Madagascar. It belongs to the district of Betroka, which is a part of Anosy Region. The population of the commune was estimated to be approximately 10,000 in 2001 commune census.

Only primary schooling is available. The majority 54% of the population of the commune are farmers, while an additional 44% receives their livelihood from raising livestock. The most important crop is rice, while other important products are peanuts, maize and cassava. Services provide employment for 1% of the population. Additionally fishing employs 1% of the population.
