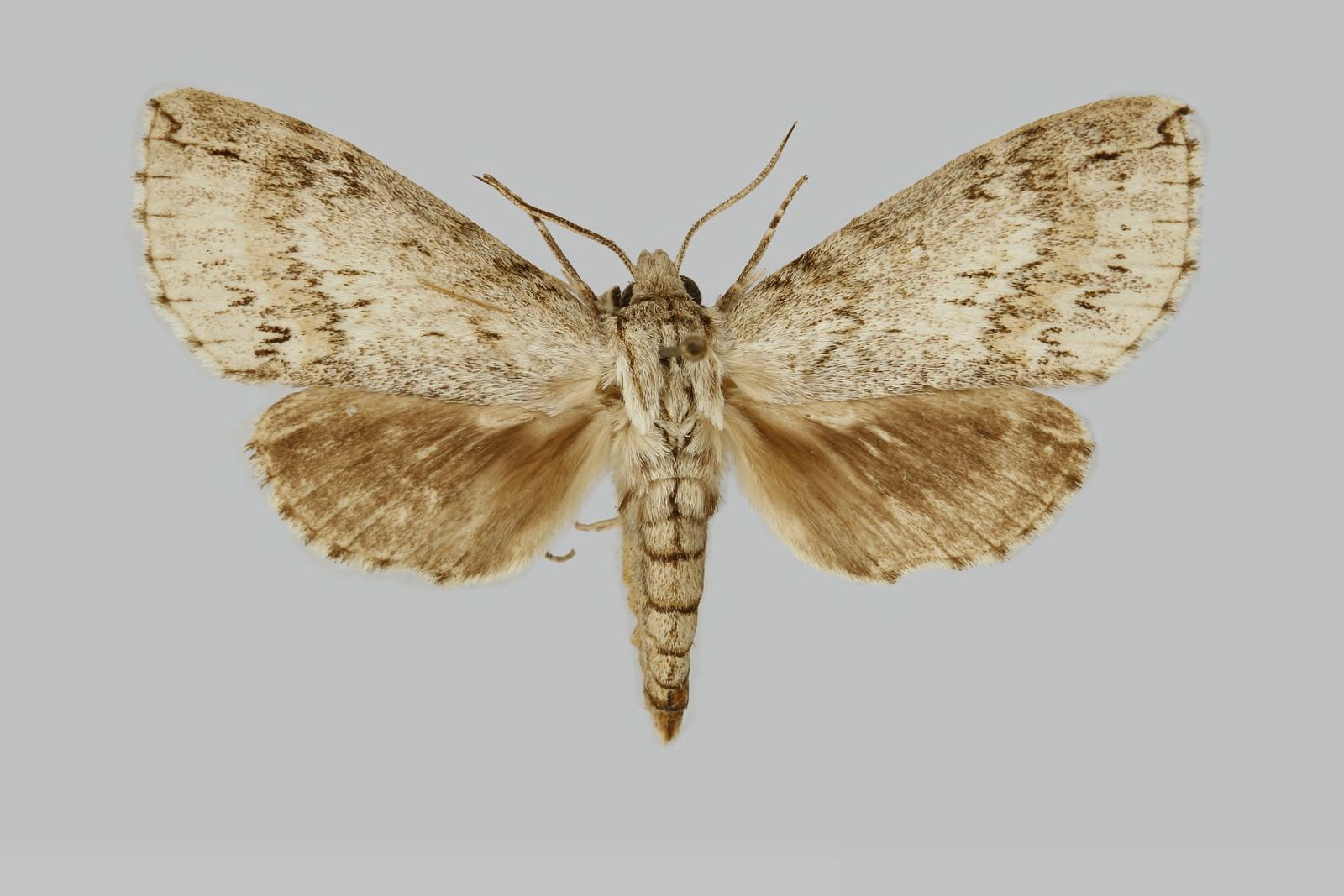
- Malgassoclanis suffuscus

Scientific classification
- Kingdom: Animalia
- Phylum: Arthropoda
- Class: Insecta
- Order: Lepidoptera
- Family: Sphingidae
- Tribe: Smerinthini
- Genus: Malgassoclanis; Carcasson, 1968

= Malgassoclanis =

Genus of moths

Malgassoclanis is a genus of moths in the family Sphingidae first described by Robert Herbert Carcasson in 1968.

== Species ==
- Malgassoclanis delicatus (Jordan 1921)
- Malgassoclanis suffuscus (Griveaud 1959)
