= Ambalasoa =

- Location in Madagascar
- Coordinates: 23°7′S 46°0′E
- Country: Madagascar
- Region: Anosy
- District: Betroka
- Elevation: 881 m (2,890 ft)

Population (2018)Census
  - Total: 5,337
- Time zone: UTC3 (EAT)
- Postal code: 613

Ambalasoa is a rural municipality in Madagascar. It belongs to the district of Betroka, which is a part of Anosy Region. The population of the municipality was 5337 in 2018.

Only primary schooling is available. The majority 95% of the population of the commune are farmers, while an additional 3% receives their livelihood from raising livestock. The most important crop is rice, while other important products are peanuts, beans and cassava. Services employ 2% of the population.
