= Bekily District =

- Location in Madagascar
- Coordinates: 24°00′00″S 45°30′36″E
- Country: Madagascar
- Region: Androy

Area
  - Total: 5,233 km^{2} (2,020 sq mi)

Population (2020)
  - Total: 252,765
  - Density: 48.30/km^{2} (125.1/sq mi)
- Time zone: UTC3 (EAT)
- Postal code: 607

The Bekily District is a district in the Androy Region, located in south Madagascar. The district has an area of 5,233 km^{2} (2,020 sq mi), and the estimated population in 2020 was 252,765.

== Communes ==
The district is further divided into 20 communes:

- Ambahita
- Ambatomainty, Androy
- Ambatosola
- Anivorano Mitsinjo
- Anja Nord
- Ankaranabo Nord
- Antsakoamaro
- Bekitro
- Bekily Centre
- Belindo Mahasoa
- Beraketa
- Besakoa
- Beteza
- Bevitiky
- Manakompy
- Maroviro
- Morafeno Bekily
- Tanambao Tsirandrana
- Tanandava
- Tsikolaky
- Vohimanga
