= Nagnarena =

- Interactive map of Nagnarena
- Country: Madagascar
- Region: Anosy
- District: Betroka

Population (2001)
  - Total: 3,000
- Time zone: UTC3 (EAT)

Nagnarena is a town and commune in Madagascar. It belongs to the district of Betroka, which is a part of Anosy Region. The population of the commune was estimated to be approximately 3,000 in 2001 commune census.

Only primary schooling is available. Farming and raising livestock provides employment for 49.5% and 50% of the working population. The most important crop is rice, while other important products are peanuts, cassava and sweet potatoes. Services provide employment for 0.5% of the population.
