= Linta River =

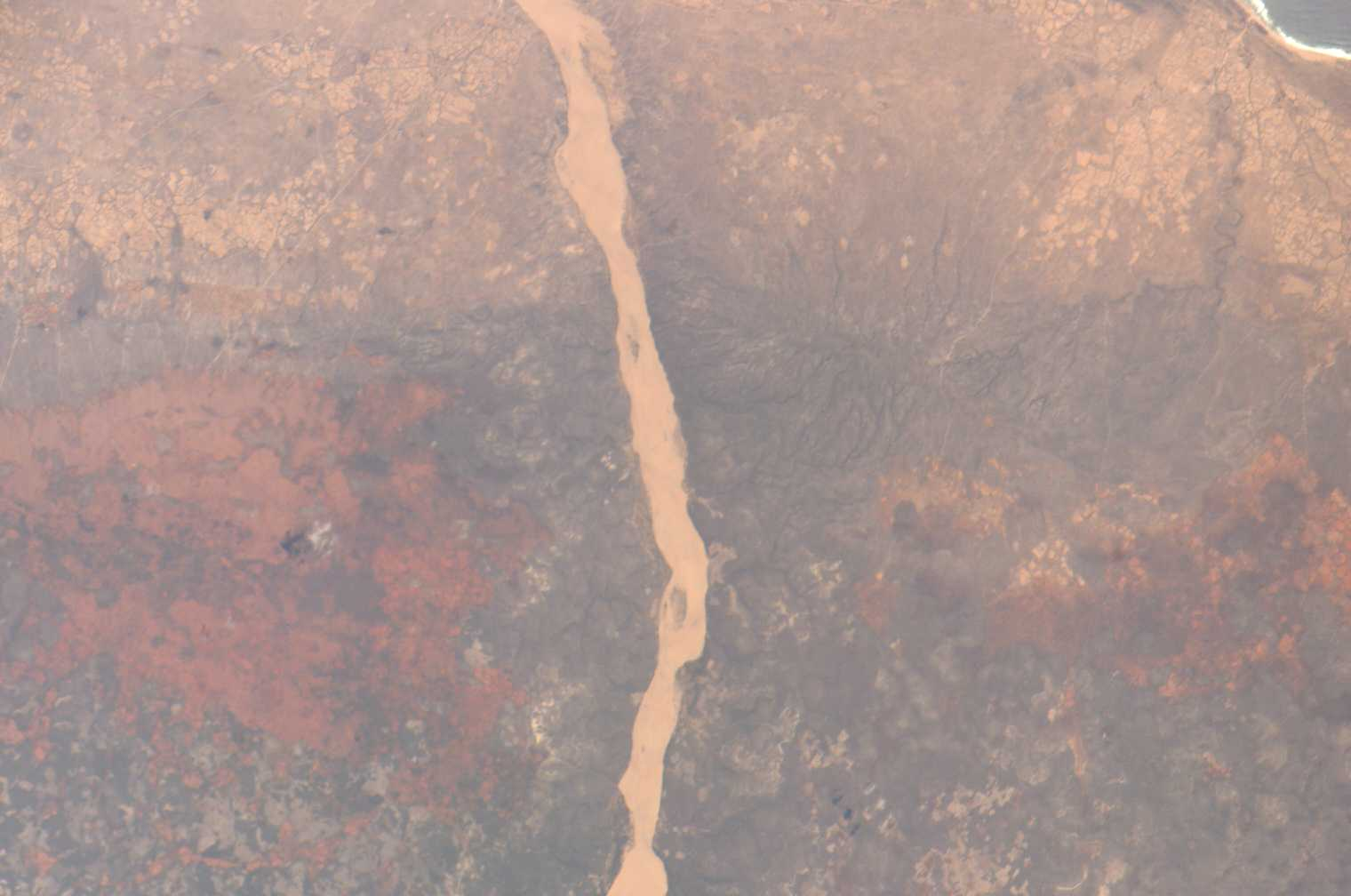
- Linta river

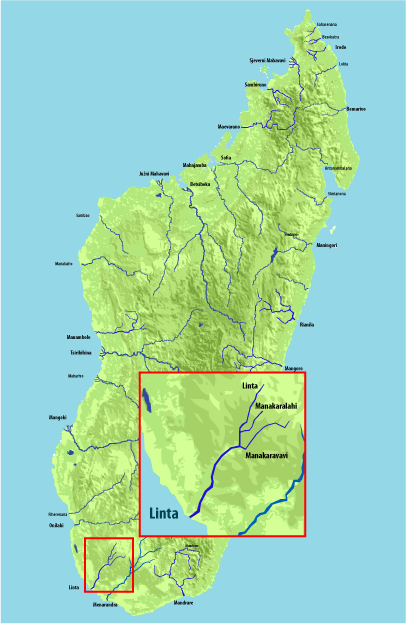
- Map of Malagasy rivers (Linta flows into the Indian Ocean).

Location
- Country: Madagascar
- Region: Atsimo-Andrefana
- City: Ejeda

Physical characteristics
- Source
  - elevation: 520 m (1,710 ft)
- Source confluence: Fotadrevo
- Mouth: Indian Ocean
  - location: Androka, Atsimo-Andrefana
  - coordinates: 25°02′00″S 44°01′00″E
  - elevation: 0 m (0 ft)
- Length: 173 km (107 mi)
- Basin size: 5,800 km^{2} (2,200 sq mi)

Basin features
- Tributaries
  - left: Manakaralahy, Manakaravavy

Linta is a river in the region of Atsimo-Andrefana in southern Madagascar. It crosses the Route nationale 10 near Ejeda and flows into the Indian Ocean in the Bay of Langarano, east of Androka. Where the Linta river delta meets the ocean, a gap in the coral reef is visible, idicating the river once flowed when the ocean was at a lower depth.

Its main affluents are the Manakaralahy and Manakaravavy which are dry during the dry season from July to November. Its annual discharge is low, approx. 1–2 L/s/km^{2}. Drought in the region has caused local residents to dredge portions of the dry riverbed to find water.
