= Ambondro =

- Location in Madagascar
- Coordinates: 25°15′S 45°50′E
- Country: Madagascar
- Region: Androy
- District: Ambovombe
- Elevation: 202 m (663 ft)

Population (2018)
  - Total: 20,796
  - Ethnicities: Antandroy
- Time zone: UTC3 (EAT)
- postal code: 604

Ambondro is a town and commune in Madagascar. It belongs to the district of Ambovombe, which is a part of Androy Region. It is crossed by the Route nationale 10.

The population of the commune was estimated to be approximately 20796 in 2018.

Primary education, as well as junior and senior-level secondary education is available in town. The majority 58% of the population of the commune are farmers, while an additional 40% receives their livelihood from raising livestock. The most important crops are cassava and cowpeas, while other important agricultural products are peanuts, maize and sweet potatoes. Services provide employment for 2% of the population.
