= Karimbola =

Ethnic group in Madagascar

Total population
- 182,000

Regions with significant populations
- Madagascar

Languages
- Karimbola

Religion
- Traditional beliefs Christianity

Related ethnic groups
- Antandroy, Mahafaly

The Karimbola (pronunciation: [kaˈɾim.bu.la]) are an ethnic group of Madagascar residing in the arid southern region of the island, particularly in areas surrounding the coastal and inland zones of Beloha.

== Recognition ==
Although culturally and linguistically distinct, the Karimbola are not officially recognized among the 18 major ethnic groups of Madagascar. They are often registered as of either the Antandroy or Mahafaly, despite longstanding traditions and historical references identifying them as a separate ethnic community since at least the 17th century.

== History ==
The region historically inhabited by the Karimbola appeared on 17th and 18th century maps under the name Caremboule. French colonial governor Étienne de Flacourt, based in Fort-Dauphin, was among the first to document the Karimbola as a distinct group, separate from the Mahafaly and the Antandroy then referred to as the Ampatres.

The Karimbola had a fearsome reputation among European sailors, who considered them cruel and merciless, especially toward shipwrecked foreigners. Their name alone was enough to inspire dread among crews navigating Madagascar’s southern coast. One of the most notorious incidents involved a Dutch ship with around 500 crew members; following a shipwreck near Karimbola territory, some of the sailors were massacred by the inhabitants, while others died from privation and conflict during attempts to reach Fort Dauphin. A few survivors managed to escape in small boats. This event was so violent and deadly that the area became known as the "Dutch Graveyard." Following these events, many European ships deliberately avoided the Karimbola coastline out of fear for their lives.

After defeating the Karimbola and Mahafaly peoples, the French adventurer La Case required them to deliver annual payments of gold and cattle to the colony of Fort-Dauphin.

The Karimbola's territory lies within the geographic boundaries of Androy as shown on 19th-century maps, but they do not share territory with the Antandroy proper, known as the Atampatres, and are considered distinct from them. Androy remained outside the control of the Merina Kingdom and retained its independence until its annexation by French colonial forces in the early 20th century.
