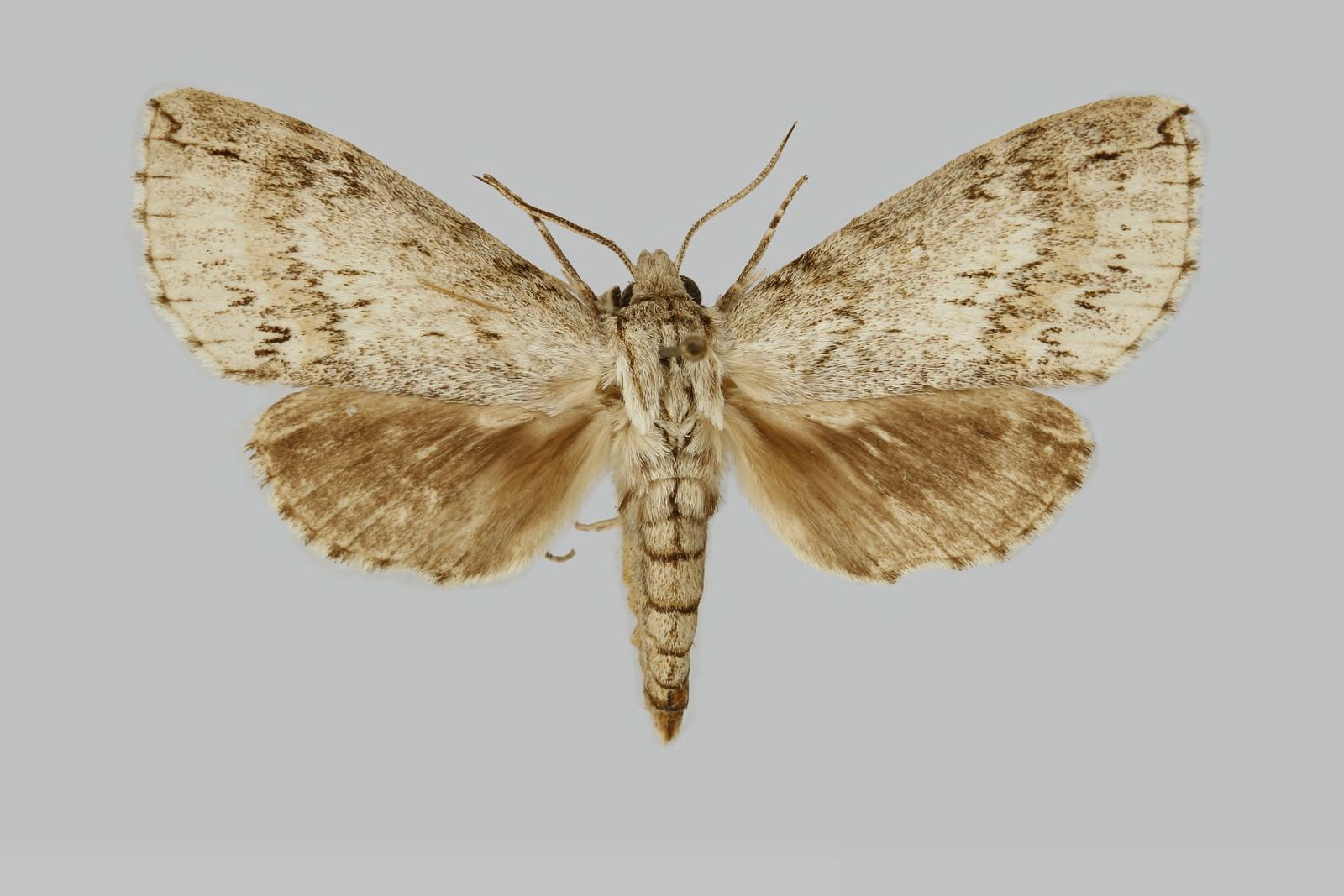

Scientific classification
- Kingdom: Animalia
- Phylum: Arthropoda
- Class: Insecta
- Order: Lepidoptera
- Family: Sphingidae
- Genus: Malgassoclanis
- Species: M. suffuscus

Binomial name
- Malgassoclanis suffuscus (Griveaud, 1959)

Synonyms
- Polyptychus suffuscus Griveaud, 1959

= Malgassoclanis suffuscus =

Species of moth

Malgassoclanis suffuscus is a moth of the family Sphingidae. It is known from Madagascar.
