= Androka =

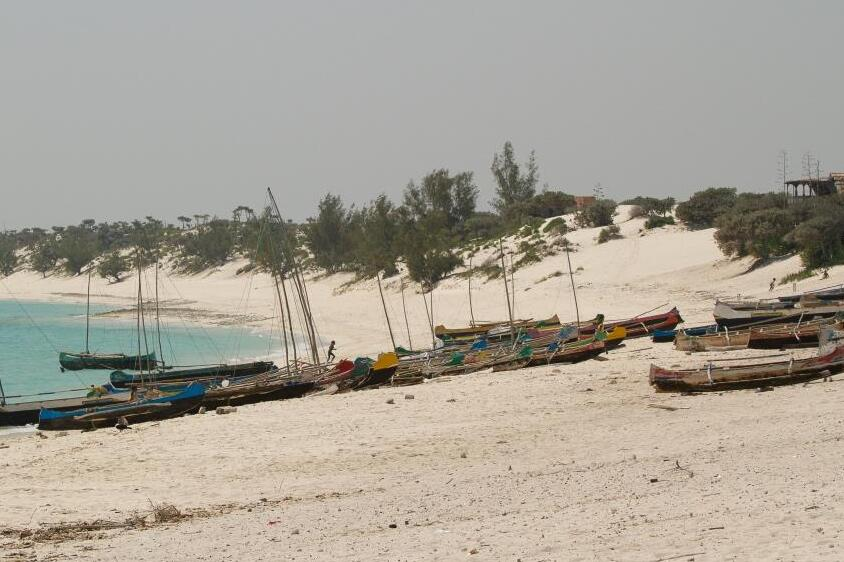
- canoes at Androka

- Location in Madagascar
- Coordinates: 24°59′S 44°27′E
- Country: Madagascar
- Region: Atsimo-Andrefana
- District: Ampanihy

Area
  - Total: 4,575 km^{2} (1,766 sq mi)
- Elevation: 177 m (581 ft)

Population (2018)Census
  - Total: 39,168
  - Ethnicities: Mahafaly and Vezo
- Time zone: UTC3 (EAT)
- Postal code: 605

Androka is a rural municipality in southwestern Madagascar. It belongs to the district of Ampanihy, which is a part of Atsimo-Andrefana Region. It has a population of 39168 inhabitants in 2018.

Primary and junior level secondary education are available in town. The majority 80% of the population of the commune are farmers, while an additional 5% receives their livelihood from raising livestock. The most important crop is maize, while other important products are cassava and sweet potatoes. Services provide employment for 5% of the population. Additionally fishing employs 10% of the population.

== Geography ==
The municipality is situated in the Bay of Langarano by the Linta River. In the south the municipality is bordered by the Menarandra River. It borders south of Tsimanampetsotsa National Park and the Nosy Ve-Androka National Park.

== Notable people ==
- Efiaimbalo, sculptor
