= Belindo Mahasoa =

- Location in Madagascar
- Coordinates: 24°29′S 45°25′E
- Country: Madagascar
- Region: Androy
- District: Bekily
- Elevation: 380 m (1,250 ft)

Population (2001)
  - Total: 5,000
- Time zone: UTC3 (EAT)

Belindo Mahasoa is a town and commune in Madagascar. It belongs to the district of Bekily, which is a part of Androy Region. The population of the commune was estimated to be approximately 5,000 in 2001 commune census.

Only primary schooling is available. The majority 80% of the population of the commune are farmers, while an additional 19.5% receives their livelihood from raising livestock. The most important crops are cassava and peanuts; also maize is an important agricultural product. Services provide employment for 0.5% of the population.
