= Tsaraitso =

- Location in Madagascar
- Coordinates: 23°15′S 46°16′E
- Country: Madagascar
- Region: Anosy
- District: Betroka
- Elevation: 1,477 m (4,846 ft)

Population (2001)
  - Total: 4,000
- Time zone: UTC3 (EAT)

Tsaraitso is a town and commune in Madagascar. It belongs to the district of Betroka, which is a part of Anosy Region. The population of the commune was estimated to be approximately 4,000 in 2001 commune census.

Only primary schooling is available. Farming and raising livestock provides employment for 49.5% and 49.5% of the working population. The most important crops are rice and onions, while other important agricultural products are maize and cassava. Services provide employment for 1% of the population.
