= Sahamandrevo =

Town in Madagascar

Coordinates: 23°16′13″S 45°34′30″E

Sahamandrevo is a town in the region of Anosy in Madagascar in southern central Madagascar.

The geology of the area is interesting. For example, it has significant Thorium ore.

It lies on the Onilahy River. The nearest city is Betroka.
