= Betroka District =

- Location in Madagascar
- Country: Madagascar
- Region: Anosy
- District: Betroka

Area
  - Total: 14,060 km^{2} (5,430 sq mi)

Population (2018)census
  - Total: 210,071
  - Ethnicities: Bara
- Time zone: UTC3 (EAT)
- Postal code: 613

Betroka is a district of Anosy in Madagascar.

== Communes ==
The district is further divided into 20 communes:

- Ambalasoa
- Ambatomivary
- Analamary
- Andriandampy
- Beapombo I
- Beapombo II
- Bekorobo
- Benato-Toby
- Betroka
- Iaborotra
- Ianabinda
- Ianakafy
- Isoanala
- Ivahona
- Jangany
- Mahabo
- Mahasoa Est
- Nagnarena
- Naninora
- Tsaraitso

== Rivers ==
The Mangoky River and its affluents (Imaloto, Sakamahily, Sakory, Ihazototsy) is the main river system in the district of Betroka.
