= Bekorobo =

- Location in Madagascar
- Coordinates: 23°48′S 45°54′E
- Country: Madagascar
- Region: Anosy
- District: Betroka
- Elevation: 957 m (3,140 ft)

Population (2001)
  - Total: 6,000
- Time zone: UTC3 (EAT)

Bekorobo is a town and commune in Madagascar. It belongs to the district of Betroka, which is a part of Anosy Region. The population of the commune was estimated to be approximately 6,000 in 2001 commune census.

Only primary schooling is available. The majority 75% of the population of the commune are farmers, while an additional 20% receives their livelihood from raising livestock. The most important crops are rice and onions, while other important agricultural products are peanuts and cassava. Services provide employment for 5% of the population.
