= Betroka =

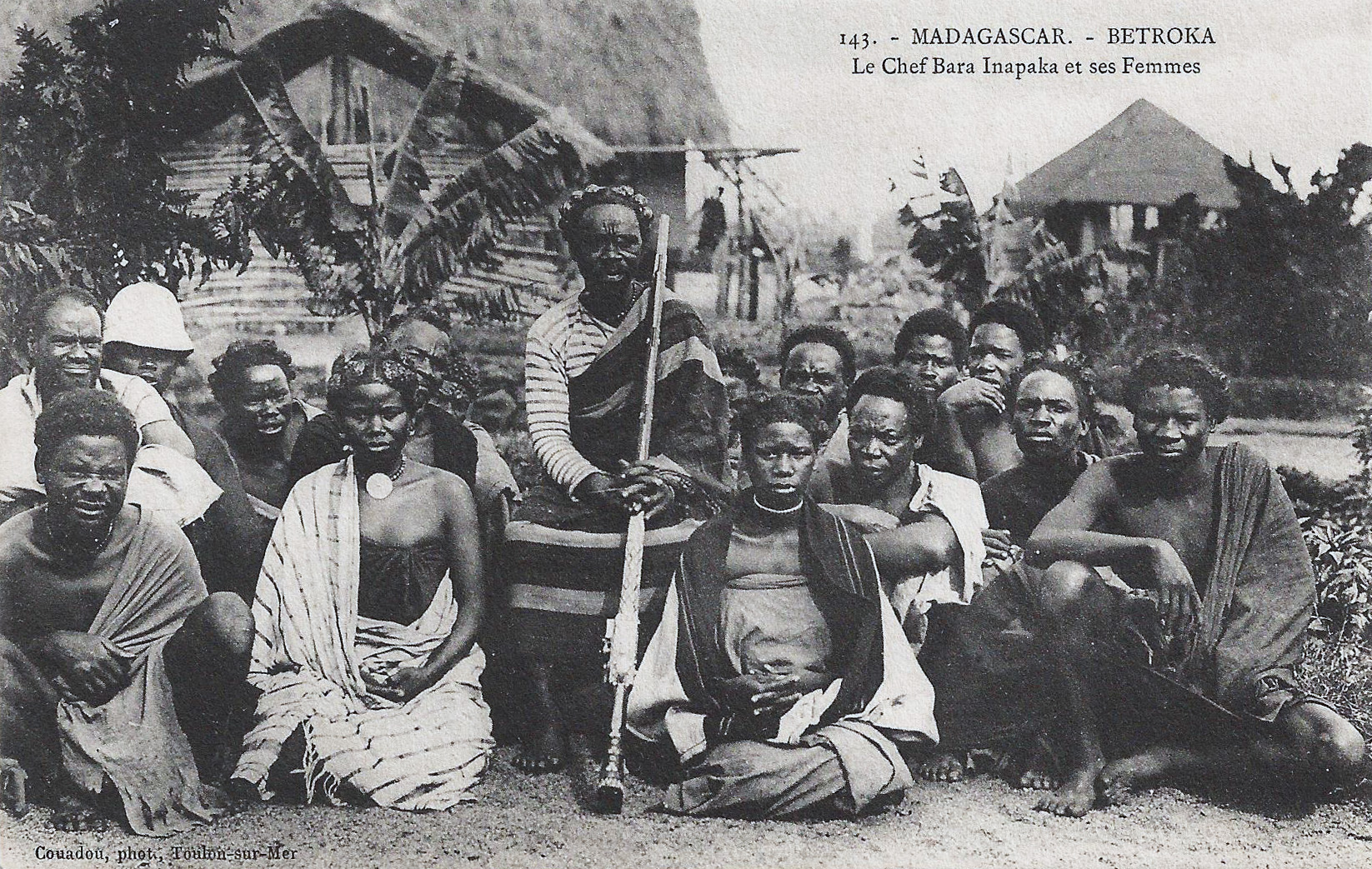

- Location in Madagascar
- Country: Madagascar
- Region: Anosy
- District: Betroka

Population (2018)census
  - Total: 17,327
  - Ethnicities: Bara
- Time zone: UTC3 (EAT)
- Postal code: 613

Betroka [ˈbeʈʂukə̥] is a hilly city (commune urbaine) in the Anosy Region in southern Madagascar, and is the source of the Onilahy River.

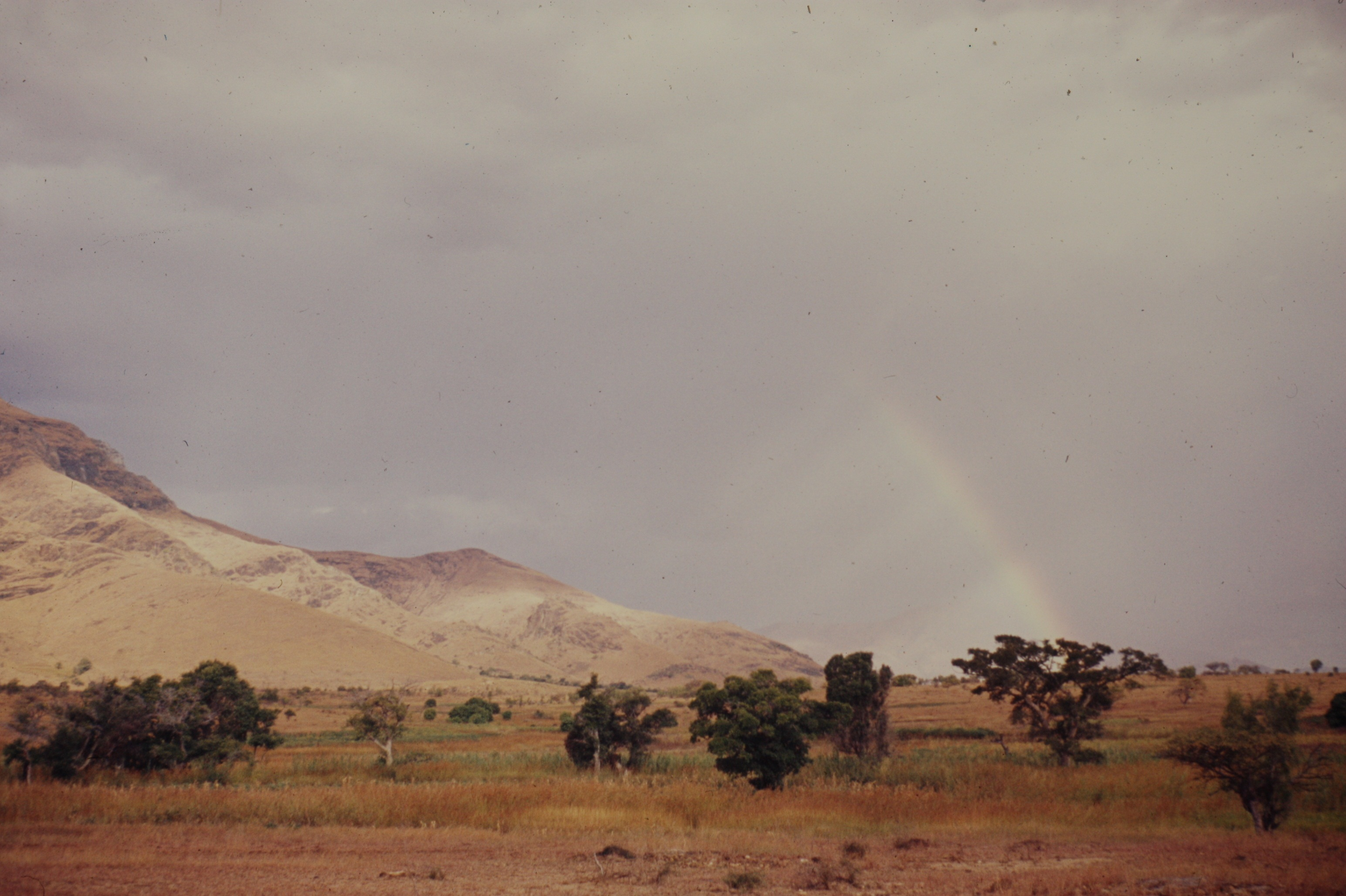
the region around Betroka

It is situated at the Route nationale 13, Ihosy to Tolagnaro, at 118 km from Ihosy, 77 km from Isoanala and 203 km from Antanimora Sud. An airport serves the town.

The true name of the city is Betroky which means tree with a big belly. But the Merina (Ambaniandro) changed the name after. Betroky belongs to Bara tribe, a tribe from the east of Madagasikara.

== Nature ==
The Kalambatritra Reserve is at 55 km East of Betroka.

== See also ==
- Sahamandrevo
