= Andriandampy =

- Location in Madagascar
- Coordinates: 22°46′S 45°40′E
- Country: Madagascar
- Region: Anosy
- District: Betroka
- Elevation: 866 m (2,841 ft)

Population (2001)
  - Total: 6,000
- Time zone: UTC3 (EAT)

Andriandampy is a town and commune in Madagascar. It belongs to the district of Betroka, which is a part of Anosy Region. The population of the commune was estimated to be approximately 6,000 in 2001 commune census.

Primary and junior level secondary education are available in town. Farming and raising livestock provides employment for 46% and 49% of the working population. The most important crop is rice, while other important products are peanuts, maize and cassava. Industry and services provide employment for 1% and 4% of the population, respectively.
