= Morafeno Bekily =

- Location in Madagascar
- Coordinates: 24°13′19″S 45°18′50″E
- Country: Madagascar
- Region: Androy
- District: Bekily
- Elevation: 434 m (1,424 ft)

Population (2001)
  - Total: 10,000
- Time zone: UTC3 (EAT)

Morafeno Bekily is a town and commune in Madagascar. It belongs to the district of Bekily, which is a part of Androy Region. The population of the commune was estimated to be approximately 10,000 in 2001 commune census.

In addition to primary schooling the town offers secondary education at both junior and senior levels. The town provides access to hospital services to its citizens. The majority 75% of the population of the commune are farmers, while an additional 15% receives their livelihood from raising livestock. The most important crop is rice, while other important products are peanuts and cassava. Services provide employment for 2% of the population. Additionally fishing employs 8% of the population.
