= Célestin Manasoa =

Malagasy politician

Célestin Manasoa is a Malagasy politician. He was member of the National Assembly of Madagascar as a member of the Tiako I Madagasikara party, he represented the constituency of Ambovombe. He was also mayor of Ambazoa.
