= Benato-Toby =

Benato - Toby
- Location in Madagascar
- Coordinates: 23°5′S 45°52′E
- Country: Madagascar
- Region: Anosy
- District: Betroka
- Elevation: 824 m (2,703 ft)

Population (2001)
  - Total: 9,000
- Time zone: UTC3 (EAT)

Benato - Toby is a town and commune in Madagascar. It belongs to the district of Betroka, which is a part of Anosy Region. The population of the commune was estimated to be approximately 9,000 in 2001 commune census.

Only primary schooling is available. It is also a site of industrial-scale mining. The majority 50% of the population of the commune are farmers, while an additional 40% receives their livelihood from raising livestock. The most important crop is rice, while other important products are maize and cassava. Services provide employment for 10% of the population.
