= Ejeda =

- Location in Madagascar
- Coordinates: 24°21′S 44°31′E
- Country: Madagascar
- Region: Atsimo-Andrefana
- District: Ampanihy
- Elevation: 235 m (771 ft)

Population (2018)Census
  - Total: 49,915
  - Ethnicities: Mahafaly
- Time zone: UTC3 (EAT)

Ejeda is a rural municipality in southwestern Madagascar. It belongs to the district of Ampanihy, which is a part of Atsimo-Andrefana Region. With 49,915 inhabitants it is the largest town of the Ampanihy Ouest (district).

It is situated at the Route nationale 10 that crosses the Linta River near Ejeda.

Ejeda is served by a local airport. Primary and junior level secondary education are available in town. The town provides access to hospital services to its citizens.

The majority 60% of the population of the commune are farmers, while an additional 35% receives their livelihood from raising livestock. The most important crop is maize, while other important products are peanuts, cassava and chickpea. Services provide employment for 5% of the population.

Ejeda has recorded a temperature of 43.6 °C (110.5 °F), which is the highest temperature to have ever been recorded in Madagascar.

== Nature ==
- the Tsimanampetsotsa National Park is nearby.
