= Mahabo, Betroka =

Mahabo
- Location in Madagascar
- Coordinates: 24°17′00″S 45°12′55″E
- Country: Madagascar
- Region: Anosy
- District: Betroka

Population (2001)
  - Total: 9,000
- Time zone: UTC3 (EAT)

Mahabo is a town and commune in Madagascar. It belongs to the district of Betroka, which is a part of Anosy Region. The population of the commune was estimated to be approximately 9,000 in a 2001 commune census.

Only primary schooling is available. The majority 55% of the population of the commune are farmers, while an additional 38% receives their livelihood from raising livestock. The most important crop is rice, while other important products are peanuts and cassava. Services provide employment for 5% of the population. Additionally, fishing employs 2% of the population.
