= Jangany =

- Location in Madagascar
- Coordinates: 22°51′S 45°47′E
- Country: Madagascar
- Region: Anosy
- District: Betroka
- Elevation: 907 m (2,976 ft)

Population (2001)
  - Total: 10,000
  - Ethnicities: Bara
- Time zone: UTC3 (EAT)

Jangany is a town and commune in Madagascar. It belongs to the district of Betroka, which is a part of Anosy Region. The population of the commune was estimated to be approximately 10,000 in 2001 commune census.

Primary and junior level secondary education are available in the town thanks to the presence of a Roman Catholic mission. The majority 50% of the population of the commune are farmers, while an additional 40% receives their livelihood from raising livestock. The most important crop is rice, while other important products are peanuts, sugarcane and cassava. Industry and services provide employment for 5% and 3% of the population, respectively. Additionally fishing employs 2% of the population.
