= Bay of Langarano =

Bay in the south-western coast of Madagascar

- Baie de Langarano (French)
- Location in Madagascar
- Location: Atsimo-Andrefana, Madagascar
- Coordinates: 25°1′S 44°1′E
- River sources: Linta River
- Ocean/sea sources: Indian Ocean
- Basin countries: Madagascar

The Bay of Langarano (French: Baie de Langarano) is a bay in the south-western coast of Madagascar.

== Geography ==
The bay is in the region of Atsimo-Andrefana. It lies in the Mozambique Channel area, between the mouths of the Linta River and the Menarandra River. Port d'Androka is a harbour located 4 km to the southeast.

== See also ==
- Geography of Madagascar
