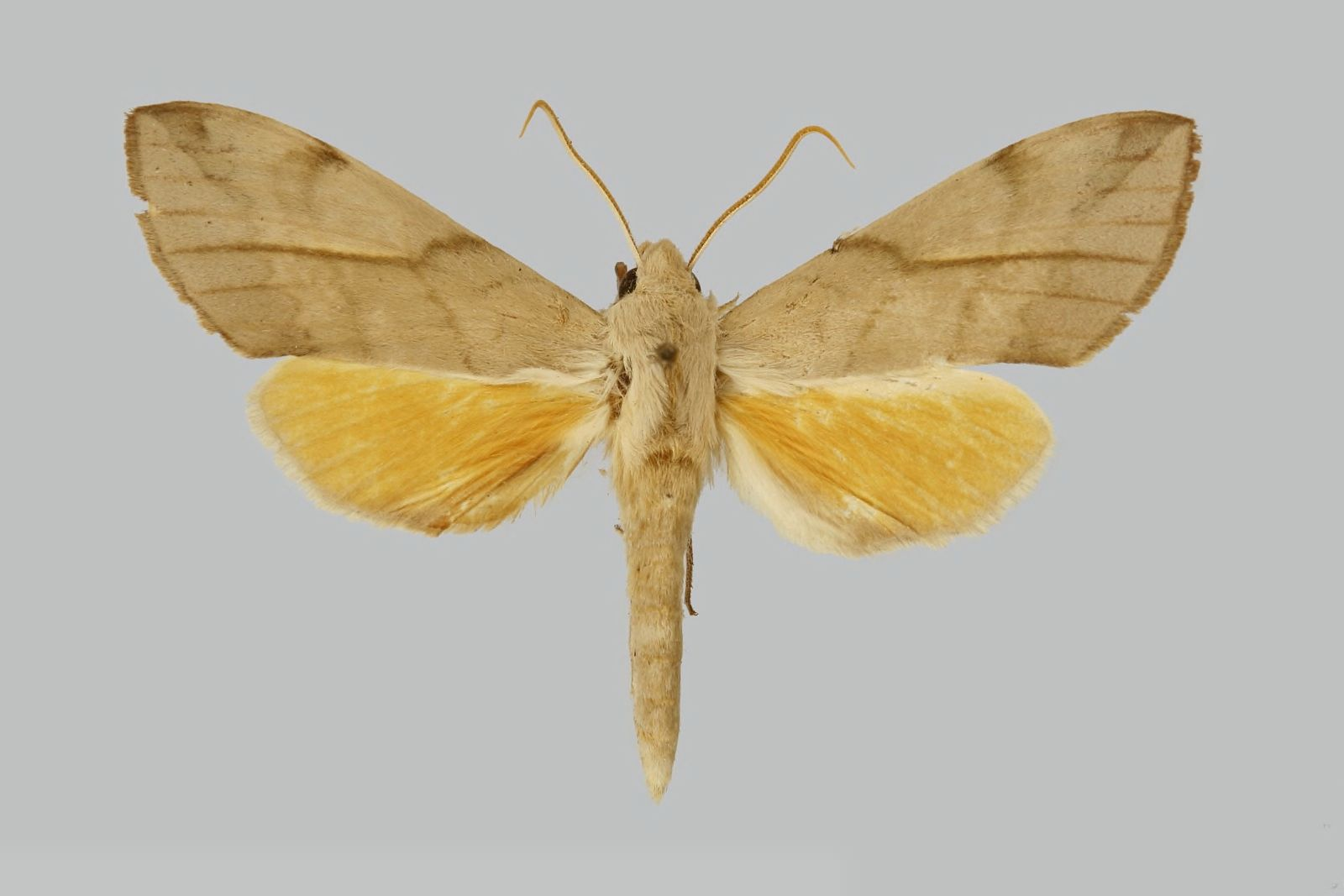

Scientific classification
- Kingdom: Animalia
- Phylum: Arthropoda
- Class: Insecta
- Order: Lepidoptera
- Family: Sphingidae
- Genus: Malgassoclanis
- Species: M. delicatus

Binomial name
- Malgassoclanis delicatus (Jordan, 1921)

Synonyms
- Polyptychus delicatus Jordan, 1921; Malgassoclanis delicatus maculalis Griveaud, 1971

= Malgassoclanis delicatus =

Species of moth

Malgassoclanis delicatus is a moth of the family Sphingidae. It is known from Madagascar.

The males of this species have a wingspan of 45–55 mm, and the females of 60–70 mm. The basic colour of their forewings is greyish brown or brownish, the hindwings are orange with external border in grey or brown. The abdomen and thorax are grey or brownish.
