= Beraketa =

- Location in Madagascar
- Coordinates: 24°11′S 45°41′E
- Country: Madagascar
- Region: Androy
- District: Bekily
- Elevation: 537 m (1,762 ft)

Population (2001)
  - Total: 14,000
- Time zone: UTC3 (EAT)

Beraketa is a town and commune in Madagascar. It belongs to the district of Bekily, which is a part of Androy Region.

== Location ==
It is situated at the Route nationale 13, Ihosy to Tolagnaro.

== Population ==
The population of the commune was estimated to be approximately 14,000 in 2001 commune census.

The majority (80%) of the population of the commune are farmers. The most important crop is rice, while other important products are peanuts and cassava. Industry and services provide employment for 1% and 19% of the population, respectively.

== Sorrounding industries ==
Beraketa is served by a local airport. Primary and junior level secondary education are available in town. It is also a site of industrial-scale mining.
