= Dennis Belindo =

Kiowa-Diné painter, educator, analyst and activist

- Aun So Te
- Born: December 12, 1938; Phoenix, Arizona, US
- Died: September 5, 2009 (aged 70); Oklahoma City, Oklahoma, US
- Citizenship: Kiowa, American

"Native Man with Bone Whistle," 1981, acrylic on paper.

Dennis W. Belindo (December 12, 1938 – September 5, 2009), also called Aun So Te ("Foot") was a Kiowa-Diné painter, educator, analyst and activist. He utilized acrylic, watercolor, and casein for his paintings, which combined the flat style with modernism and cubism to highlight aspects of Kiowa life. Belindo exhibited his artwork across the country and has works in the public collections of several institutions including the Oklahoma Historical Society Museum. Some of his papers are held in the collection of the Smithsonian Institution.

Belindo was born in Phoenix, Arizona to Ruby Goomda and Damon Jarrack Belindo (Be-Lin-Hilje). He is a descendant of Red Cloud and Lone Wolf (Kiowa). After graduating from high school, Belindo attended Bacone College, the University of Oklahoma, Oklahoma City University School of Law, and the University of New Mexico.

Belindo primarily lived and worked in Oklahoma. He became known for his brightly colored paintings and serigraphs. In addition to painting, he also frequently gave presentations and spoke on art and Kiowa topics. He was a member of the Black Legging Warrior Society of the Kiowa tribe and advocated for the recognition of native heritage.

He was the father of Jon and Barry Belindo, both artists in their own right. A 2006 exhibit at the Southern Plains Indian Museum in Anadarko, Oklahoma featured the work of Belindo and his sons. The show, entitled Goomda tday khon gyuop ah daw (They are Goomda's grandchildren), was dedicated to Belindo's maternal grandfather. Belindo said of this exhibit, "At this point in my life, I am dedicated to working with the young people of the Kiowa nation and as an artist to inspire others to create works of art as part of the material culture of the Kiowa people. I am a part of the last generation to have known the old people."

Belindo died in 2009 in Oklahoma City. He is buried in the Rainy Mountain KCA Intertribal Cemetery.
