= Beloha District =

Beloha District Beloha-sur-Androy
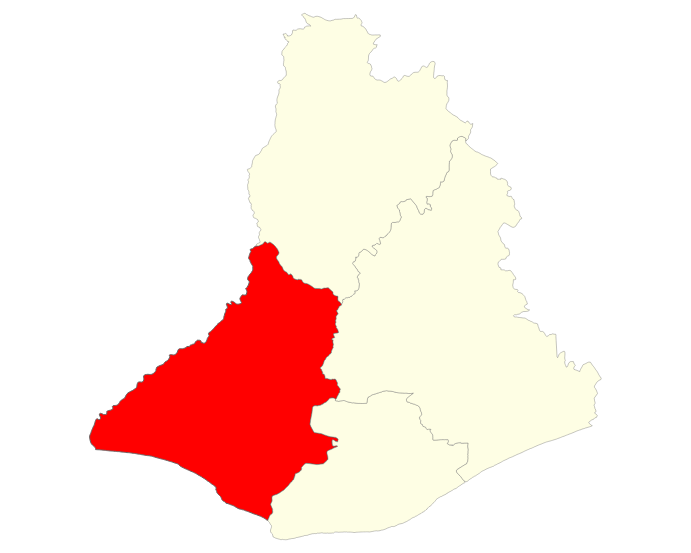

- Location in Madagascar
- Coordinates: 25°10′26″S 45°03′36″E
- Country: Madagascar
- Region: Androy
- District: Beloha

Area
  - Total: 4,787 km^{2} (1,848 sq mi)
- Elevation: 154 m (505 ft)

Population (2020)
  - Total: 167,650
  - Density: 35.02/km^{2} (90.71/sq mi)
- Time zone: UTC3 (EAT)
- Postal code: 609

Beloha District is a district in the Androy Region, located in southeastern Madagascar. The district has an area of 4,787 km^{2} (1,848 sq mi), and the estimated population in 2020 was 167,650.

== Communes ==
The district is further divided into eight communes:

- Beloha
- Kopoky
- Marolinta
- Tranoroa
- Tranovaho
- Behabobo
- Mahenina Ankamena
- Ambatotsivala
