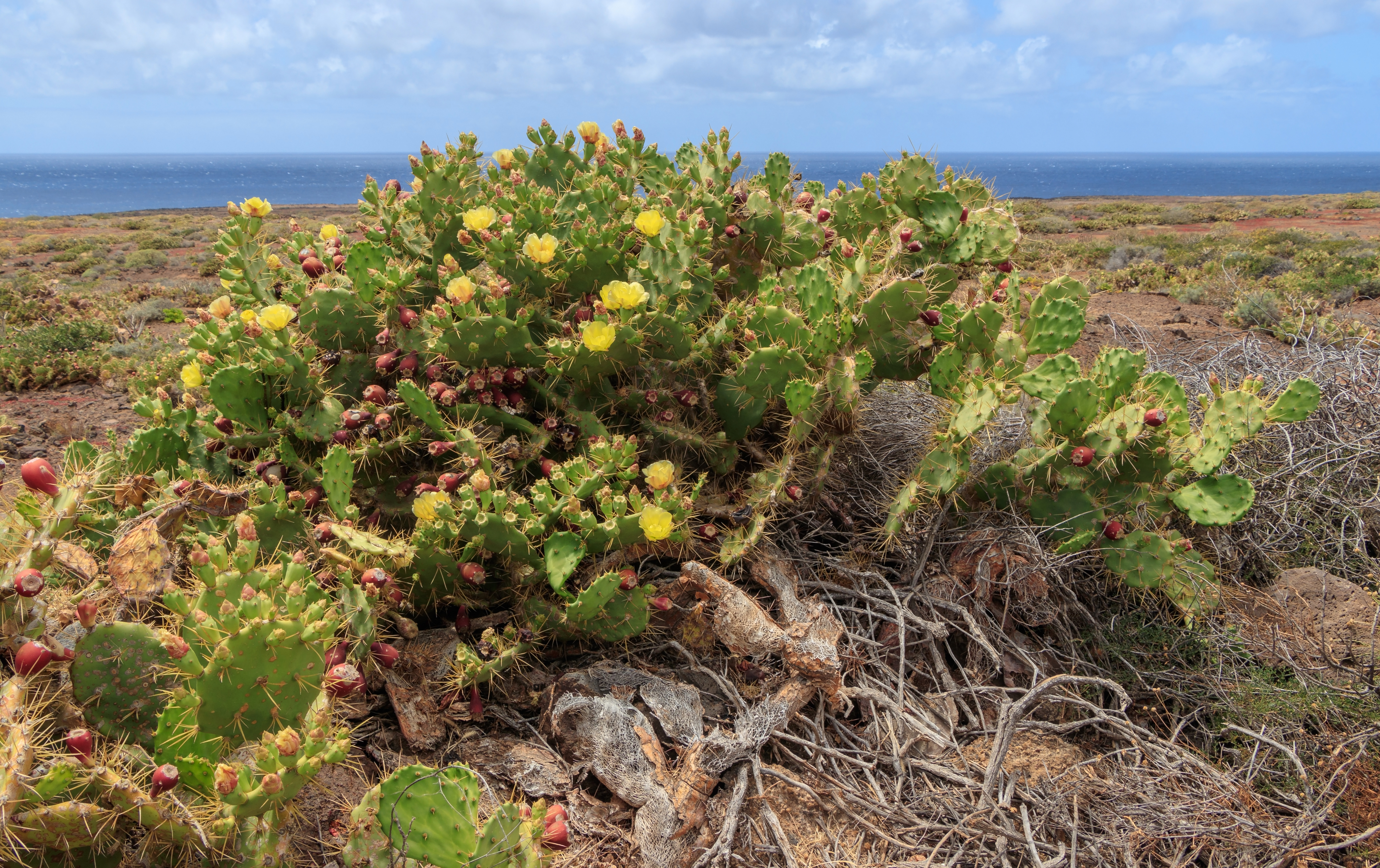

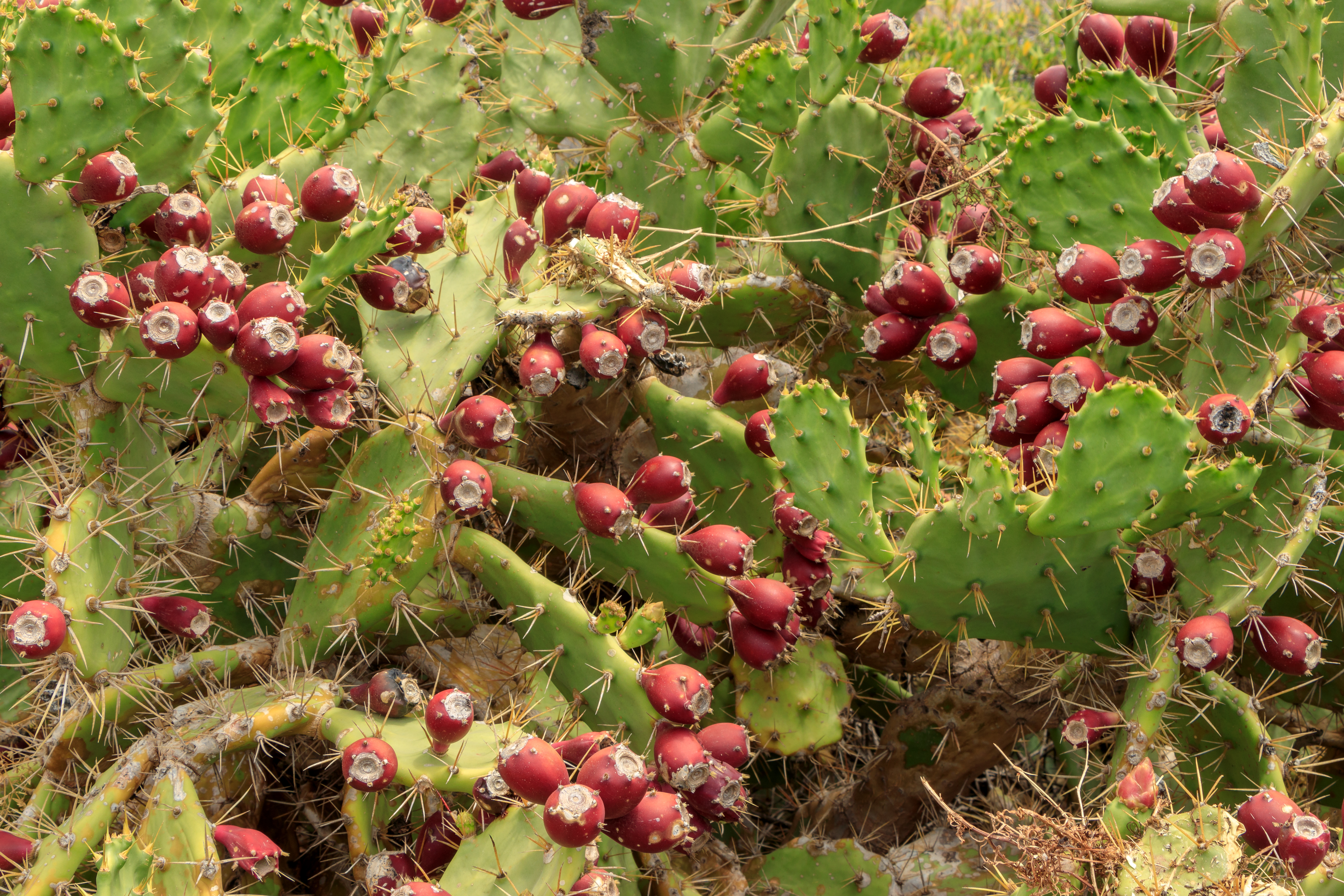

Scientific classification
- Kingdom: Plantae
- Clade: Tracheophytes
- Clade: Angiosperms
- Clade: Eudicots
- Order: Caryophyllales
- Family: Cactaceae
- Genus: Opuntia
- Species: O. dillenii

Binomial name
- Opuntia dillenii (Ker Gawl.) Haw.

Synonyms
- Cactus dillenii Ker Gawl.; Opuntia dillenii var. orbiculata Salm-Dyck; Opuntia maritima Raf.; Opuntia melanosperma Svenson; Opuntia stricta var. dillenii (Ker Gawl.) L.D.Benson; Opuntia zebrina Small

= Opuntia dillenii =

Species of flowering plant

Opuntia dillenii is a species of prickly pear native to the tropical and subtropical Americas. It is naturalized in many other parts of the world. It differs from O. stricta by having more spines per arose (usually more than 3).
