= Menarandra River =

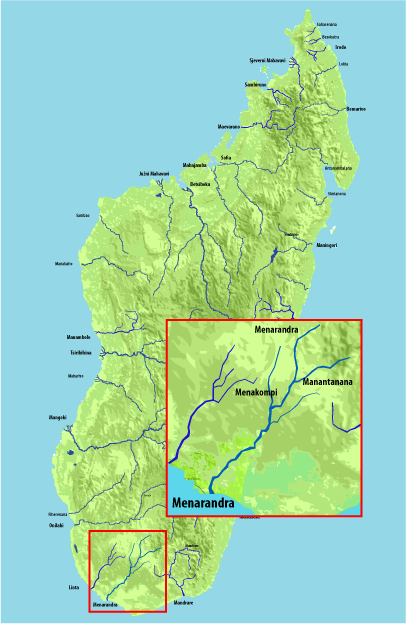

Location
- Country: Madagascar
- Region: Atsimo-Andrefana, Anosy
- Cities: Tranoroa, Riambe, Vohitovoa, Morafeno Bekily

Physical characteristics
- Source
  - location: west of Isoanala, Tsikoriky massif
  - elevation: 600 m (2,000 ft)
- Mouth: Indian Ocean
  - location: near Bevoalavo Est, Anosy
  - coordinates: 25°16′40″S 44°29′40″E
  - elevation: 0 m (0 ft)
- Length: 235 km (146 mi)
- Basin size: 8,350 km^{2} (3,220 sq mi)

Basin features
- Tributaries
  - left: Manantanana River at Bekily, Menakompy River, 30 km south of Bekily, Ivovoky

Menarandra is a river in the regions of Androy and Atsimo-Andrefana in southern Madagascar. It flows into the Indian Ocean near Bevoalavo Est.

Its annual discharge is low, approx. 2–3 L/s/km^{2} at Tranoroa where it also crossed the National road 10. Between Tranoroa and its mouth in the Indian Ocean it forms the border between the regions of Androy and Atsimo-Andrefana.

The Mahafaly ethnic group inhabits the area between the Menaranda River and the Onilahy River.
