= Bekitro =

- Location in Madagascar
- Coordinates: 24°33′S 45°18′E
- Country: Madagascar
- Region: Androy
- District: Bekily

Government
  - Mayor: Henri Ramandefitra

Area
  - Total: 1,027 km^{2} (397 sq mi)
- Elevation: 329 m (1,079 ft)

Population (2001)
  - Total: 16,000
- Time zone: UTC3 (EAT)
- Postal code: 607

Bekitro is a rural municipality in Madagascar. It belongs to the district of Bekily, which is a part of Androy Region. The population of the commune was estimated to be approximately 16,000 in 2001 commune census.

Primary and junior level secondary education are available in town. It is also a site of industrial-scale mining. The majority 78% of the population of the commune are farmers, while an additional 20% receives their livelihood from raising livestock. The most important crops are cassava and peanuts; also maize is an important agricultural product. Industry and services provide both employment for 0.5% of the population. Additionally fishing employs 1% of the population.
