= Mahasoa Est =

Mahasoa Est Mahasoa Atsinanana
- Location in Madagascar
- Coordinates: 22°57′S 45°33′E
- Country: Madagascar
- Region: Anosy
- District: Betroka
- Elevation: 800 m (2,600 ft)

Population (2018)Census
  - Total: 8,126
- Time zone: UTC3 (EAT)
- Postal code: 613

Mahasoa Est is a rural municipality in Madagascar. It belongs to the district of Betroka, which is a part of Anosy Region. It has a population of 8126 inhabitants (2018).

Only primary schooling is available. Farming and raising livestock provides employment for 48% and 49% of the working population. The most important crops are rice and cassava, while other important agricultural products are maize and onions. Services provide employment for 2% of the population. Additionally fishing employs 1% of the population.
