= Bekily =

Coordinates: 23°36′0″S 46°01′0″E

- town
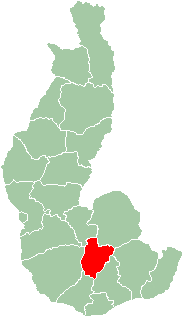
- Map of Toliara Province showing the location of Bekily (red).
- Country: Madagascar
- Province: Toliara
- Region: Androy
- District: Bekily District

Bekily is a town in the region of Androy and in the former Toliara Province, Madagascar. It is the main city of the Bekily District and is situated at the Menarandra River in the South of Madagascar.

== Geography ==
An airport serves the town. The RN 17 from Fenoarivo Nord (National road 13) to Mikaikarivo - Fotadrevo - Beroy Sud - Ambatry (RN 10) goes through Bekily but its not more than a dirt track.
