= Tsiombe =

Tsihombe Tsiombe
- Location in Madagascar
- Coordinates: 25°18′S 45°29′E
- Country: Madagascar
- Region: Androy
- District: Tsihombe
- Elevation: 150 m (490 ft)
- Time zone: UTC3 (EAT)
- Postal code: 621

Tsiombe is a municipality and a district of Androy in Madagascar.

== Geography ==
This district is crossed by the Route nationale 10 and the Manambovo river. Tsihome is located at 65 km west of Ambovombe and 45 km East of Beloha.

The district of Tsihombe includes the Cape Sainte Marie, the southernmost point of Madagascar. At Cape Sainte Marie there is also a wildlife reserve.

This is the semi-arid region of Madagascar and the population uses to eat cactus fruit and crickets to survive.

A water-pipeline of 225 km is presently under construction if the tubes will not be embezzled.
