= Cape Sainte Marie =

Southernmost point of Madagascar

Cape Sainte Marie Special Reserve
- IUCN category IV (habitat/species management area)
- Location within Madagascar
- Location: Androy Region, Madagascar
- Coordinates: 25°34′00″S 45°31′00″E
- Area: 62.98 km^{2} (24.32 sq mi)
- Designation: special reserve
- Designated: 1962

Cape Sainte Marie (Malagasy: Tanjona Vohimena; French: cap Sainte-Marie), formerly known as Cape Romain and Cape St. Mary, is the southernmost point of Madagascar. It is situated in the Androy region 42 kilometres (26 mi) from Tsiombe. It is the location of the Cap Sainte-Marie Special Reserve, a nature reserve which occupies most of the cape and was created in 1962.
