= Beloha =

Beloha Beloha-sur-Androy
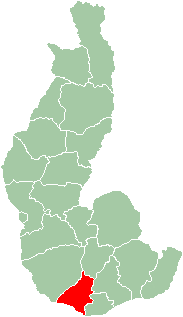
- Toliara Beloha

- Location in Madagascar
- Coordinates: 25°10′26″S 45°03′36″E
- Country: Madagascar
- Region: Androy
- District: Beloha
- Elevation: 154 m (505 ft)
- Time zone: UTC3 (EAT)
- Postal code: 609

Beloha is a rural municipality in Androy Region, Madagascar. It is situated along the unpaved Route nationale 10.

Beloha is situated near the Cape Sainte Marie, the southernmost point of Madagascar. At Cape Sainte Marie is also a wildlife reserve. This is the semi-arid region of Madagascar. A water-pipeline of 225 km is presently under construction if the tubes will not be embezzled.

The population uses to eat crickets to survive.
