= Isoanala =

- Location in Madagascar
- Coordinates: 23°50′S 45°43′E
- Country: Madagascar
- Region: Anosy
- District: Betroka
- Elevation: 688 m (2,257 ft)

Population (2001)
  - Total: 17,000
  - Ethnicities: Bara
- Time zone: UTC3 (EAT)

Isoanala is a rural municipality in Madagascar. It belongs to the district of Betroka, which is a part of the Anosy Region. The population of the commune was estimated to be approximately 17,000 in the 2001 commune census.

Primary and junior level secondary education are available in the town. Farming and raising livestock provides employment for 49% and 48% of the working population. The most important crop is rice, while other important products are peanuts and cassava. Industry and services both provide employment for 1% of the population. Additionally fishing employs another 1% of the population.

== Geography ==
The municipality is crossed by the Isoanala river and the National road 13.
