= Androy =

Coordinates: 24°48′0″S 45°18′0″E

Androy Region
- Region
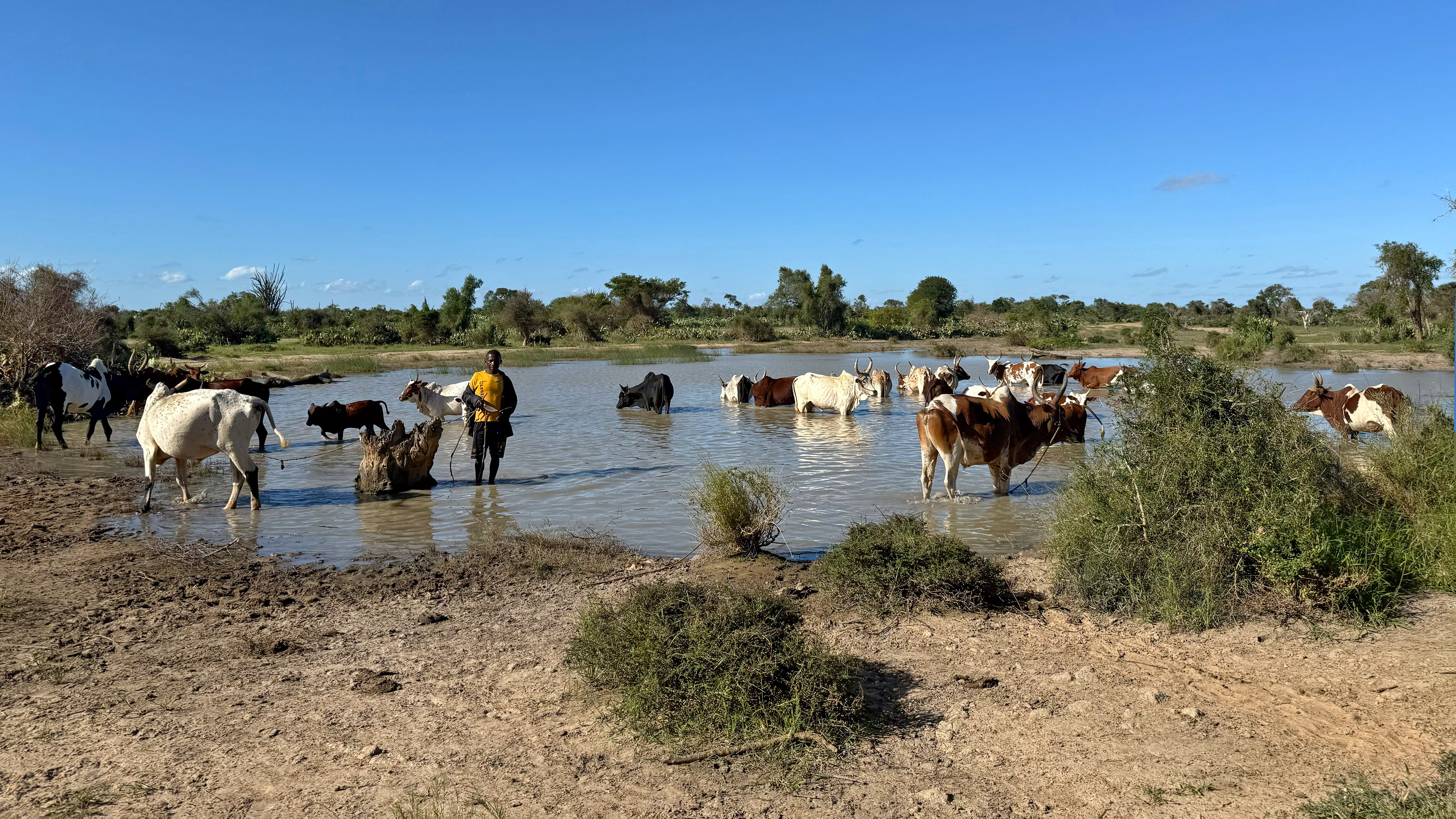
- Typical scenery in Androy

- Location in Madagascar
- Country: Madagascar
- Capital: Ambovombe-Androy

Government
  - Governor: Lahimaro Tsimandilatse Soja

Area
  - Total: 19,317 km^{2} (7,458 sq mi)

Population (2018)
  - Total: 903,376
  - Density: 46.766/km^{2} (121.12/sq mi)
  - Ethnicities: Antandroy
- Time zone: UTC3 (EAT)
- HDI (2018): 0.425 low · 20th of 22

Androy is the most southerly region of Madagascar. It covers an area of 19,540 km^{2}, and had a population of 903,376 inhabitants in 2018. The administrative capital is Ambovombe-Androy.

== Area ==
Androy (literally "the land of roy" (Mimosa delicatula) but more commonly translated as "spiny land") is the deep south of Madagascar. It is located south of the Tropic of Capricorn and conventionally delimited between the Mandrare and Menarandra rivers. It is 19,540 km^{2} and is bordered by the Mahafaly people to the northwest (Atsimo-Andrefana), the Antanosy to the east (Anosy) and the Bara land to the north (starting at about Isoanala).

== Administrative divisions ==
Androy Region is divided into four districts, which are sub-divided into 56 municipalities, which cover 881 villages (fokontany).

- Ambovombe District - 21 communes
- Bekily District - 20 communes
- Beloha District - 8 communes
- Tsiombe District - 7 communes

A request for the division of the Ambovombe District was made in February 2023 that would create also the Antanimora Atsimo district with 9 municipalities.

== Population ==
In 2013 the estimated total population of Androy Region was 733,933 inhabitants, with a population growth rate of 2.7% (means population will double in 25 years if not reduced). The population is almost entirely Tandroy ("people of the thorny bush") or Karimbola (in the southwest), with small numbers of Antanosy, Mahafaly, Merina and Betsileo who also live there. The Tandroy may also be called the "'Antandroy'", but "'Tandroy'" is preferable. (With "'roy'" meaning thorn, and the prefix "'an'" meaning "'place of'", the additional "'t'" means "'from'". Thus, adding another "'an'" to make '"Antandroy'" is redundant.) There are another estimated 150,000 Tandroy living in other parts of the island, many of them having moved due to recurring famine in the Androy region. In 2013 some 349,675 people - almost half of the total population of Androy - lived in the Ambovombe-Androy District, which has a population density of 60/km2. The strip along the southeast coast (which has been described by some as "the Tandroy Cradle"), is the most densely populated. Bekily District had about 164,751 inhabitants (32/km2), Beloha District has about 109,361 (23/km2) and Tsihombe District has about 110,147 (50/km2) inhabitants.

== Climatology ==
The Androy region is semi- to sub-arid with an average rainfall of just 400 mm (15.7 in) (350 mm (13.8 in) along the southwestern coast to 700 mm (27.6 in) towards the north), which is unevenly distributed during the year (though there's generally more rain December through February). Other than the Mandrare river, most riverbeds are dry for much of the year and it has frequent droughts (generally every eight to ten years) which often lead to Kere (famine). Coupled with this are almost constant strong, drying winds, especially along the coast, known as "Tiokatimo." Water is in such short supply that it is delivered by truck to some people and sold by those who sell it from oxcarts to others. The periodic famines have caused somewhere between 15 and 30% of the Antandroy to have left Androy, having moved west to Toliary or to northern Madagascar.

== Protected areas ==
- Behara Tranomaro New Protected Area
- Cap Sainte Marie Special Reserve
- Ifotaky Avaratra (Ifotaky Nord) New Protected Area

== Economy ==
Due to inadequate water and a large population, Androy is a region of chronic food insecurity and is one of the poorest regions in Madagascar. Most people are subsistence farmers (it is estimated that less than 5% of the land is farmed) growing cassava, maize, sweet potatoes, legumes, cowpeas, groundnuts, lentils, millet, sorghum and mangos (rice is not possible due to arid climate). Cash crops include sisal (grown only in the lower Mandrare river region) and groundnuts (cotton production has declined). There also pastoralists who raise cattle, sheep, goats and chickens. Zebu are central to the religious and social life of the Antandroy. While they supply milk, meat and leather, they are also a very important determinant of the status and wealth of the Tandroy people. While Androy borders the ocean, there is minimal fishing, most for local consumption. Of the almost 20,000 km2, only 344 km2 are forested.

Trades include silversmiths (generally part-time), tailors, cobblers and carpenters. Basketry is still practiced, but blacksmiths and those who dye cotton cloth, weave silk and make pottery have declined. Stores are mostly quite small, located in urban centers and are mostly owned by Indo-Pakistanis, Chinese and Malagasy from the highlands. There are also weekly markets where homegrown produce is sold and things like soap, cooking pots and other things can be purchased.

== Transport ==
=== Airport ===
- Bekily Airport

=== Roads ===
- the Route nationale 10 crosses this region.
- from Ihosy - Betroka - Ambovombe leads the Route nationale 13 to Taolanaro (110 km) in the East.

== History ==
Some argue the Tandroy are a "composite ethnicity" of many clans of diverse origins (including the Sakalava, Bara, Mahafaly and Antanosy) who arrived in migration "waves," settling in Androy only several centuries ago. There is also evidence of "pre-Tandroy" inhabitants from as far back as the 11th and 12th centuries. For a timeline of the history of Androy, see below.

== Timeline ==
=== 10th to 13th Centuries ===
- possible evidence of human consumption of Aepyornis eggs near Talaky at the Manambovo rivermouth
- Manda ("enclosure") Civilization, which arose in the 10th Century and fell in the 13th, had towns near Bekily and Bekitro, Andaro on a tributary of the Linta near Fotadrevo, east of Lanany river's junction with the Manambovo, west of Vohimena, north of Vohipary and at Bebajine. Based on archeological finds, several of these towns appear to have been involved in trade by sea with Zimbabwe, Mozambique and the Swahili Coast (sites of "pre-Tandroy" inhabitants identified by stone-and earth-walled enclosures).

=== 14th to 15th Centuries ===
- population in Androy fell dramatically, as did imports, with most settlements located for defense of villagers (one of the largest at that time, Ampahijoloke, was defended on three sides by river cliffs).

=== 16th Century ===
- Royal center of the Andriamanare (Zafimanara), Tandroy's royal clan/dynasty (who dominated Androy till the 18th century), at Ampotake. There were also royal centers located in Montefeno and Anjampanorora (25 km south of Ambaro).
- beginning of expansion of the Antandroy kingdom
- 1529 - July 28, East of False Cape, Manambovo River mouth. Landing of Raoul and Jean Parmentier, captains of le Sacre and la Pensée ships.

=== 17th Century ===
- 1648 - Étienne de Flacourt reaches the Mandrare river and carves two words on a stone: "Cave Incolas".
- 1649 - Ancient royal settlement at Montefeno, ruled by King Andrianmififarivo, king of Ampatres, was visited by soldiers sent by Governor Étienne de Flacourt from Fort Dauphin).
- late 1600s - King Andrianjoma, who lived near Ambaro, became the founding ancestor of the Tekonda line of Andriamañare.

=== 18th Century ===
- early 1700s - Menarandra area of southwestern Androy annexed by Maroserana dynasty
- 1703 - Shipwreck of the Degrave, an English East Indiaman, at Belitsaky (25 km from Ambovombe?). Robert Drury (sailor) visited the royal capital of Fenoarivo (Ambaro) shortly thereafter. His crew is massacred by the Antandroy and he is kept as a slave till 1709. [For more information see]
- different clans from the east, north and northwest invaded Androy and put an end to the ruling dynasty of the Andriamañar
- beginning of the development of what Mike Pearson et al. described as the "megalithic and monumental" Antandroy tombs
- 1769 - Introduced in Fort Dauphin during a settlement French attempt, spiny prickly pear cactus Opuntia dillenii spreads throughout the Androy region.

=== 19th Century ===
- Androy remained independent of the expanded Imerina Kingdom
- further expansion of number of communities in Androy, especially near Faralambo where the Afomarolahy clan settled

=== 20th Century ===
- 1901-1903 - French conquered Androy, though area remained in a State of Emergency due to continued Antandroy resistance to French rule
- 1916 - famine in Androy.
- 1917 - State of Emergency in Androy ended.
- 1920 - Drought and famine in Androy.
- 1924 - Introduction of a Cochineal insect Coccus cacti by Botanist H.Perrier de la Bâthie, in an attempt to ensure biological control of the invasive Opuntia dillenii cactus, called raketa gasy. Though cacti were beneficial - staple feed for human beings and cattle - it was getting difficult to save farmlands in order to grow crops.
- 1928 - Henry de Heaulme arrives in Fort Dauphin, having driven down from Tananarive in a Harley Davidson motorcycle with his wife and son in the side car. His intent was to export mica from Anosy and sisal from Androy through Fort Dauphin. This family also gets involved in conservation efforts and later also gets into the tourism business.
- 1928-29 - Droughts and a pastoral farming crisis due to the destruction of Opuntia dillenii cactus by cochineal beetle (had been introduced near Toliary in 1925 and spread east, north and south at a rate of 100 km per year, leading to the death of somewhere between 10,000 and 100,000 cattle, turning the countryside gray and leading to extensive deforestation and emigration of Antandroy people.
- 1930-31 - Deadly famine, exacerbated by droughts and a pastoral farming crisis because of the destruction of prickly pear cactus Opuntia dillenii by cochineal beetle. This cactus, previously introduced in Fort Dauphin, spread over Anosy and Androy regions:it had provided protection to herders and their cattle as well as both fruit and water to people and cattle. Eminent damages on local species of Castor oil plant are also observed. This resulted in half the population of in the Tsihombe district decreasing by half, though the number of dead versus those who emigrated out of the area is unclear. Furthermore, a cricket invasion took place.
- 1932 - Hosting the Opuntia cacti, a mite Dactylopius tomentosus is noticed.
- 1936 - Drought. Also, the first sisal plantations near Berenty Reserve are close to Amboasary Sud (Anosy).

Amboasary-Sud (Anosy) is established by Établissements Gallois. Henri de Heaulme established his sisal plantation and the Berenty Reserve.

- 1937 - Hydrographic assignment of Aviso Bougainville in the South:to chart the exact positions of the two brothers capes-the "True" and the "False"-so called by the mariners.The true one -Southernmost point of Madagascar- is named Cape Saint Marie.Latitude 25°35'S.
- 1940 - Vichy France takes over control of Madagascar.
- 1941-1944 : great famine named marotaola (that means: many human bones).
- 1943-44 - Up to half of those in Androy emigrated due to the severe famine. Another 15,000 died.
- 1945 - massive sacrifices of zebus for rain falls, in partnership with the colonial administration.
- 1955 - Plantation on 4.000 ha of Opuntia stricta, a spineless cactus, is completed. Twenty thousand hectares planned in the so-called Raketa operation. The Opuntia with a red prickly pear fruit is called raketamena.
- 1955-56 - In the Androy district, the indigenous production of food crops was : cassava 18.000t, corn 4.000t, grain sorghum 1.000t, beans 800t, groundnuts 700t .
- 1956 - Drought.
- 1956 - Amboliandro Atsimo (commune: Tsihombe) was set up a water pumping windmill - wheel diameter 6m - on a 15m high tower: it pumps out 10 cubic meters/hr water from a 45m deep well.
- 1957 - Erection of a 414m long steel bridge, designed by Anciens Ets Eiffel - Pont du Mandrare - insures the first all-year-long road link between the Androy and Anosy regions (RIG 13). The Antandroy-so called Grand Pont is one of the last impressive steel bridges, built in the nineties, just before the technological move to the prestressed concrete works.
- 1950s-60s - Boetchi (Swiss), de Heaulme and Jenny families and the Lyonnaise and Marseillaise companies exported wild beans of Castor oil plant (1220 tons in 1957), cattle (10-30,000/year), mica and sisal, much of it from Androy.
- 1958 - Monja Jaona formed the Madagasikara Otronin'ny Malagasy (MO.NI.MA.)--Madagascar for the Malagasy—party which he led till his death. This became a significant regional party which represented both radical intellectuals and peasants from the south (especially Androy).
- 1960 - Madagascar declared its independence from France.
- 1971 - Monja Jaona claimed authorship of April armed insurrection by impoverished peasants in Androy who were upset by the corruption of government tax collectors at a time when their cattle herds were being ravaged by disease. There were also frustrations due to the failure of the government to provide disaster relief in response to a serious drought which was followed by floods. On April 1–2 more than 1,000 armed members of the MO.NI.MA. attacked 5 military posts in the Tulear province, resulting in 1 of the security forces killed and 11 wounded. This was quickly and harshly suppressed by the government, with 45 of the MONI.MA. killed, 9 wounded and 847 held for questioning. Monja Jaona and hundreds of MO.NI.MA. members were arrested and sent by cargo ship from Fort Dauphin to Nosy Lava where they were imprisoned.
- 1972 - Monja Jaona and the MO.NI.MA. party, which had become a left-wing opposition movement, gained the support of Tananarive's university students and urban radicals who, though MO.NI.MA. was banned by the government, led demonstrations against President Tsiranana until his fall May 1972.
- 1980 - Drought called santiravy (iron belt).
- 1982 - Drought and famine called malalak’akanjo (one is wide in his vestimentary) because of malnutrition.
- 1986 - Drought and famine bekalapake (dried manioc) because most people only ate dried manioc for survival.
- 1989-1992 - Drought and faminetsy mitolike (eating without return). Major famine in Androy with major responses by UNICEF and the World Food Program and also by Catholic and Malagasy Lutheran churches.
- 2003 - Drought and famine in Androy. This was the first drought that had been well documented and was picked up rapidly by charitable organizations and by the press that led to first massive reactions from the international community (European Union, USAID, GTZ, Care, Japan Aïd, etc.)
- 2006-07 - Famine in Androy
- 2011 - Major drought & famine in Androy
- 2016 - Drought and famine in Androy. The UN claimed it was due to El Niño, but forgetting that this only occurs in the Pacific Ocean.
- 2021-23 - Drought and famine in Androy. This is the first time that climatic change caused a famine in Madagascar that was announced by the UN (sic). A conclusion that was given erroneously after an AFP/France 24 journalist, Gaëlle Borgia.
- 2023 - a pipeline of 97 km was built between Efaho River (Anosy) and the south of Androy. This may end speculations of the origins of the droughts and that UN might even replace back El Niño to the Pacific Ocean.

== Additional information ==
- Antandroy
- information about history from Mike Parker Pearson et al. See References below.
- Archaeology

== Notable people ==
- Jules Androkae
