= QIT =

QIT may refer to:

- QIT-Fer et Titane, a Canadian mining company
- Quadrupole ion trap
- Quantum information theory
- Queensland University of Technology
- Q = It, the formula describing charge in terms of current and time
