= Roland-Benoît Jomphe =

Canadian poet

Roland-Benoit Jomphe CM CQ
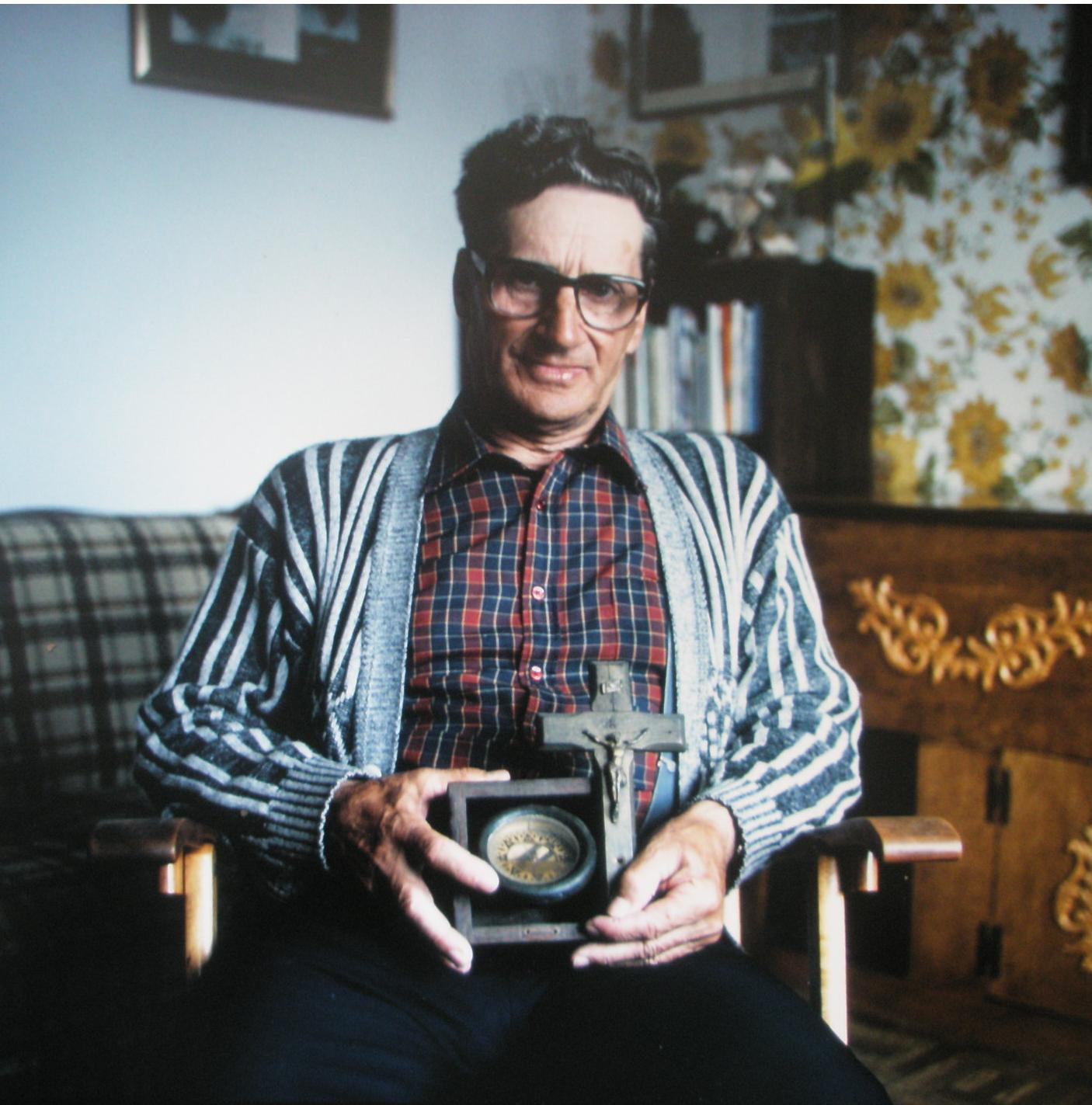
- Roland Jomphe (1990)
- Born: 1917; Pointe-aux-Esquimaux
- Died: 2003 (aged 85–86)
- Occupation: Poet

Roland-Benoît Jomphe CM CQ (1917–2003) was a Quebec poet from the Minganie region of Quebec.

== Early life ==
He was born at Pointe-aux-Esquimaux in what later became the town of Havre-Saint-Pierre. His father was a fisherman.

== Career ==
Jomphe became a fisherman like his father and many of the town's founders. From 1944 to 1948, he was the manager-secretary of a fishermen's cooperative.

With the arrival of QIT-Fer et Titane in 1948, many fishermen left their trade to become miners. In 1950, Jomphe became a sacristan (sexton) of the Parish of Saint-Pierre (St. Peter) which is operated by the Eudists. In 1967, he became Secretary-Treasurer of his municipality. In these roles, and with his boat and his local knowledge, he made it his task to promote the beauty and qualities of his region to citizens and visitors, giving over 400 presentations both at home and afield and writing poetry.

He often took travelling priests and bishops to visit the neighbouring islands of the Mingan Archipelago. During this time, he began to name the limestone monoliths which are a prominent feature of the limestone islands of the archipelago. He photographed and catalogued them in an album.

Jomphe's poetry was included in the National Film Board of Canada production, "Le Voyage au bout de la route", directed by Jean-Daniel Lafond.

Parks Canada has mounted a permanent exhibition "Tribute to Roland Jomphe" at the Havre-Saint-Pierre Reception and Interpretation Centre of the Mingan Archipelago National Park Reserve. This centre is located in the Portail Pélagie-Cormier Terminal building at the Port of Havre-Saint-Pierre.

He died in December 2003.

== Honours ==
- Member of the Order of Canada, 1981
- Member of the North Shore Order of Merit (L'Ordre du Mérite nord-côtier), 1982
- Knight of the National Order of Quebec, 1987

== Works ==
- De l'eau salée dans les veines (1978), Léméac, Montréal.
- Sous le vent de la mémoire (1982), Dominique Cormier, Havre Saint-Pierre.
- Aux îles de Mingan (1984), Environnement Parcs Canada.
- A l'écoute du temps (1983).
- Amour et souvenance (1985).
- Sur le rivage de la vie (1986).
- Iles de Mingan ou de chez nous (1986).
- Confidences des îles (1987).
- A l'ombre d'un village (1988).

== See also ==
- List of Quebec writers
