= List of ports in Madagascar =

This list of Ports and harbours in Madagascar details the ports, harbours around the coast of Madagascar.

== List of ports and harbours in Madagascar ==
Port/Harbour name	Regions	City/Town name	Coordinates	UN/Locode	Max. draught (m)	Max. deadweight (t)	Remarks
Port of Toamasina	Atsinanana	Toamasina	18°09′S 49°25′E	MGTOA	13.2	74,999	Medium-sized port on the east coast of Madagascar, facing the Indian Ocean.
Port of Diego Suarez	Antsiranana	Diana Region	12°16′S 49°17′E	MGDIE	8.7	79,403	Medium-sized port, also known as Port of Antsiranana.
Port of Tulear	Atsimo-Andrefana	Toliara	23°22′S 43°40′E	MGTLE	7.5	57,809	Medium-sized port, also known as Port of Toliara. on the south-west coast of Madagascar.
Port d'Ehoala	Anosy Region	Fort-Dauphin	25°03′S 46°58′E	MGEHL	10.7	66,402	Medium-sized port, also known as Port of Taolagnaro or Port of Fort Dauphin. It is situated 10 km from Fort Dauphin.
Port of Majunga	Boeny	Mahajanga	15°43′S 46°18′E	MGMJN	6.3	9,131	Medium-sized port, also known as Port of Mahajanga.
