= Chemin de fer de la Rivière Romaine =

Canadian rail company

Coordinates: 50°19′33″N 63°35′32″W

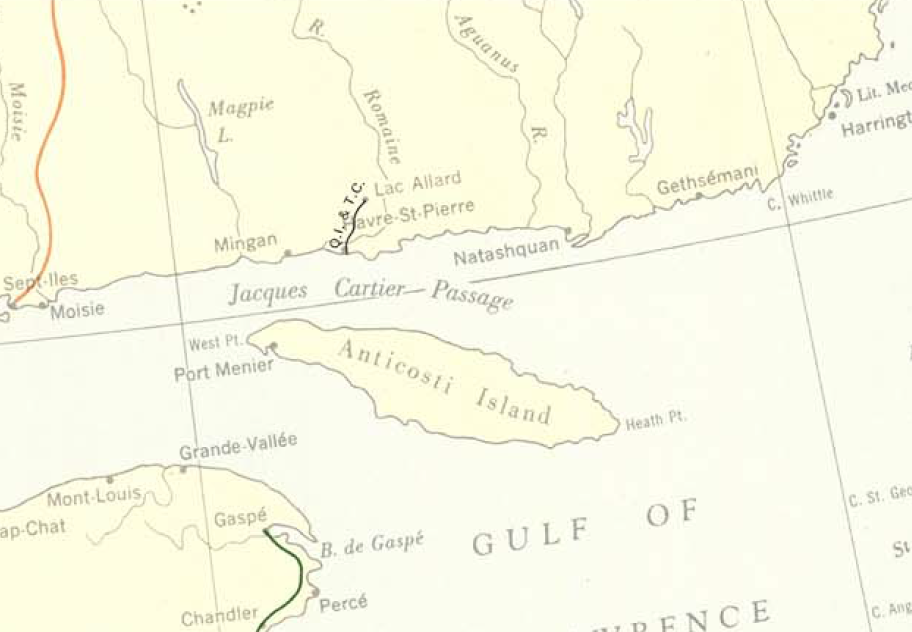
- Map of the line (identified as QIT) in 1957, center of the map

Overview
- Headquarters: Havre-Saint-Pierre
- Reporting mark: CFRR
- Locale: Havre-Saint-Pierre, Quebec
- Dates of operation: 1949–

Technical
- Track gauge: 1,435 mm (4 ft 8 1/2 in) standard gauge

The Chemin de fer de la Rivière Romaine (reporting mark CFRR) (French pronunciation: [ʃəmɛ̃ də fɛʁ də la ʁivjɛʁ ʁɔmɛn]; in English, the Romaine River Railway) is a Canadian short line iron ore mining railway operating in eastern Quebec.

== Description ==
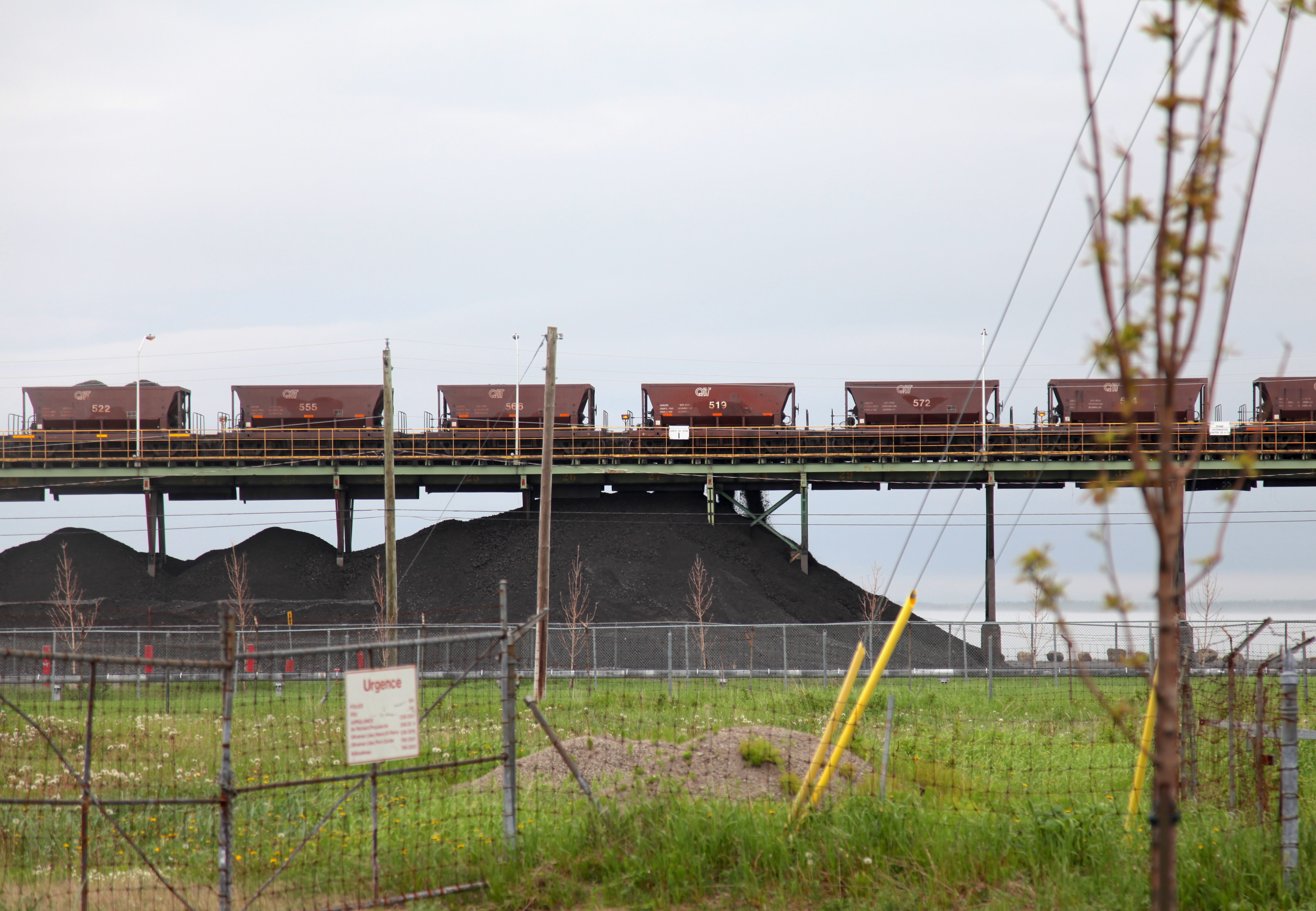
Wagons à Havre-Saint-Pierre - Rio Tinto Fer et Titane

The railway runs for 43 km (27 mi) from the port of Havre-Saint-Pierre on the north shore of the Saint Lawrence River inland to a massive ilmenite (titanium iron) deposit at Lac Allard. At Havre-Saint-Pierre, the mineral is loaded aboard bulk carriers and shipped upriver to the port of Sorel-Tracy. COGEMA operates a train ferry that connect with the line. QIT also operates passenger trains for workers, as the mine is not accessible by road.

The Romaine River Railway began operating in 1949 and is owned and operated by QIT-Fer et Titane, which is a subdivision of the Anglo-Australian company Rio Tinto Group.
