= Havre-Saint-Pierre =

- Municipality
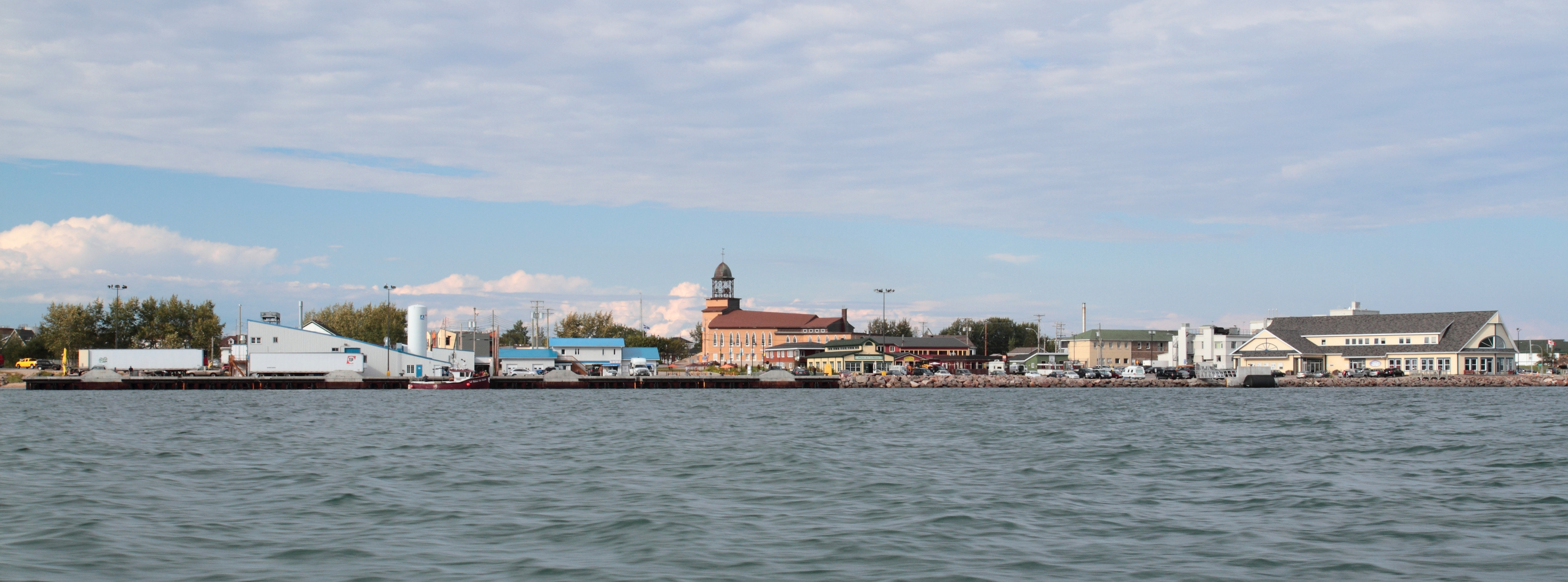
- View of Havre-Saint-Pierre
- Motto: Terre digne de richesses
- Location within Quebec Location within Canada
- Coordinates: 50°14′42″N 63°35′59″W
- Country: Canada
- Province: Quebec
- Region: Côte-Nord
- RCM: Minganie
- Settled: 1857
- Constituted: January 1, 1873

Government
  - Mayor: Paul Barriault
  - Federal riding: Côte-Nord—Kawawachikamach—Nitassinan
  - Prov. riding: Duplessis

Area
  - Total: 3,932.33 km^{2} (1,518.28 sq mi)
  - Land: 2,570.09 km^{2} (992.32 sq mi)

Population (2021)
  - Total: 3,337
  - Density: 1.3/km^{2} (3.4/sq mi)
  - Pop (2016-21): ▼3.6%
  - Dwellings: 1,655
- Time zone: UTC−05:00 (EST)
  - Summer (DST): UTC−04:00 (EDT)
- Postal code(s): G0G 1P0
- Area codes: 418 and 581
- Highways: R-138
- Website: www.havresaintpierre.com

Havre-Saint-Pierre (French pronunciation: [avʁ sɛ̃ pjɛʁ]) is a municipality located on the north shore of the Gulf of St. Lawrence, in Côte-Nord region, Minganie RCM, Quebec, Canada.

== History ==
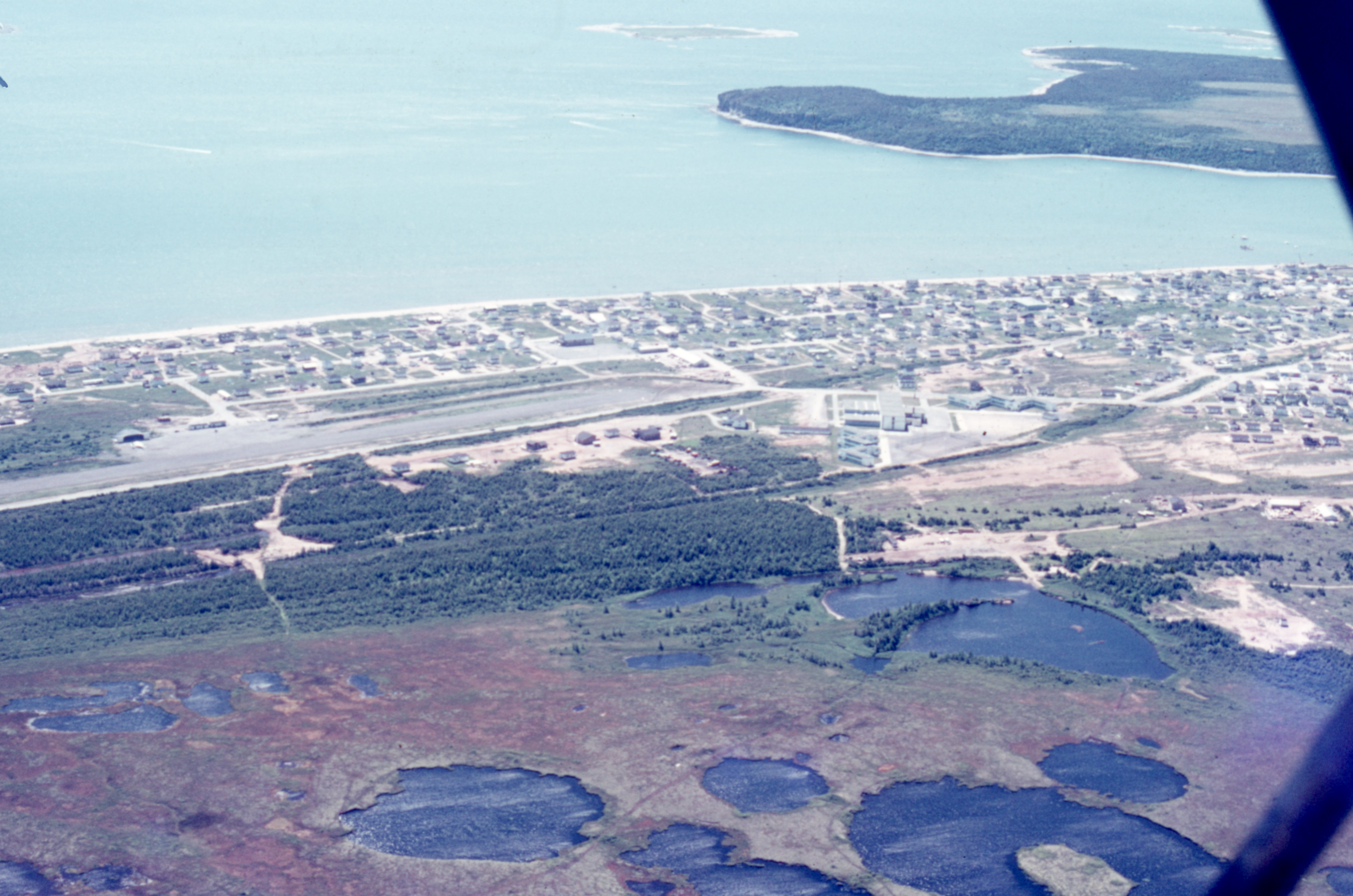
Lakes, peat bog, municipality, Gulf of St Lawrence

In 1857, a group of Acadian families arrived, in 1872, the Parish of Saint-Pierre-de-la-Pointe-aux-Esquimaux was officially established, the same year its post office opened under the name Esquimaux Point.

In 1873, the place was incorporated as a municipality. In 1924, the post office changed its name to Havre-Saint-Pierre, followed by the town in 1927, in order to focus on the harbour, which characterizes the area, while retaining the original parish name. It remained the largest town on the North Shore until 1936 when it was overtaken by Baie-Comeau.

Since 1948, the Quebec Iron and Titanium Company mines deposits of ilmenite, a mineral composed of iron and titanium, at a site some 40 km (25 mi) north. The Chemin de fer de la Rivière Romaine brings it by rail cars to Havre-Saint-Pierre.

== Geography ==
Havre-Saint-Pierre is located in a place formerly known as Rade aux Esquimaux or Pointe aux Esquimaux, north of the Mingan Archipelago and Anticosti Island, on the shores of the Gulf of St. Lawrence. The municipality is located 1000 km east of Montreal, 870 km northeast of Quebec City and 200 km from Sept-Îles. Access.

=== Geology ===
The Havre Saint-Pierre - Mingan region is located in the geological province of Grenville. It includes rocks of Precambrian and Ordovician age.

The Precambrian is represented by metamorphosed and intrusive igneous rocks. The Ordovician rocks, of sedimentary nature, belong to the Mingan Iceland group which is divided into two formations: the Romaine Formation and the Mingan Formation.

A study by Quebec Ministry of Transport and Sustainable Mobility (1986) covers several aspects of a territory 5 to 13 km wide and 70 km long along the coast from Havre-Saint-Pierre to Baie-Johan-Beetz. From an ecological and morpho-sedimentological point of view, this region and the sub-region, Havre-Saint-Pierre and Nickerson Bay, are extremely diverse.

Whether they were formed by erosion or sedimentation processes, or whether they were subjected to or resulted from extreme climatic events, or from the action of the sea and its estuary, morpho-sedimentological units bear witness to an extraordinary structural organization of the natural space.

Other important geological features in the vicinity of Havre-Saint-Pierre include the Romaine River to the north west, Manitou Falls on the Manitou River to the west, Île du Havre to the south, less than 1 km from the coast, and off the coast, Anticosti Island which can be seen on a clear day.

=== Biogeography ===
==== Flora ====
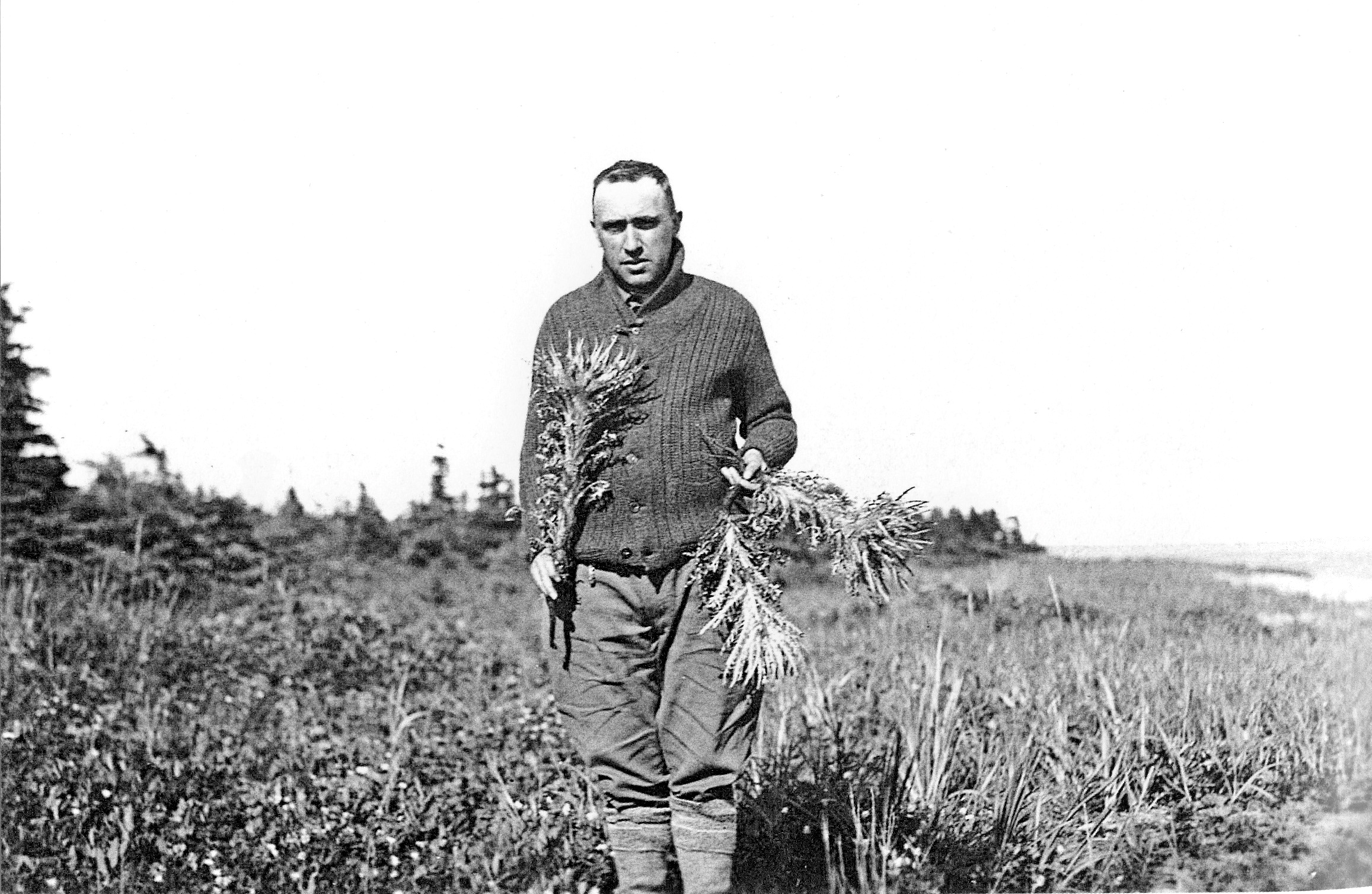
Frère Marie-Victorin (1885–1944), Mingan archipelago 1928, in hand, the C. minganense (large pale plant, with flower heads gathered in a mass surpassed by the leaves

With the exception of the enclosed area just behind the village, the area of Havre Saint-Pierre is mainly covered by large Spruce forests and a few laricinin fields (Larix laricina (Du Roi) K. Koch). There are also White spruce (Picea glauca (Moench) Voss.), Dwarf birch (Betula glandulosa Minchx), Rough alder (Alnus rugosa (DuRoi Spreng.) and Trembling aspen (Populus tremuloides Michaux).

Brothers Marie-Victorin and Rolland Germain F.E.C. explored the region from 1924 to 1928. Their work has raised awareness in the scientific community of the enormous value of the Mingan Archipelago. Since then, other scientists have added to the ecology and phytogeography knowledge of this sector.

The vegetation of the Mingan Islands belongs to the Chibougamau-Natashquan boreal forest region, which is dominated by Black spruce. The high latitude and low altitude, combined with the proximity of the cold currents of Labrador, explain the subarctic vegetation specific to the Minganie.

The entirely calcareous nature of the horizontal stratified rocks, which make up the Anticosti - Minganie, exerts a profound influence on the structure of the flora and on the choice of species.

Remarkable for its richness, the flora includes 350 vascular plants including the presence of two rare taxa: Cirsium foliosum var. Minganense and Cypripedium passerinum var. Minganense. Sixty species are new to the list of Minganie harvests compiled by Marie-Victorin and Rolland-Germain (1969). There were also 150 bryophytes and 152 lichens, 29 of which were additions to the Nouveau Catalogue des lichens, published by Lepage (1972).

Biological heritage of the environment

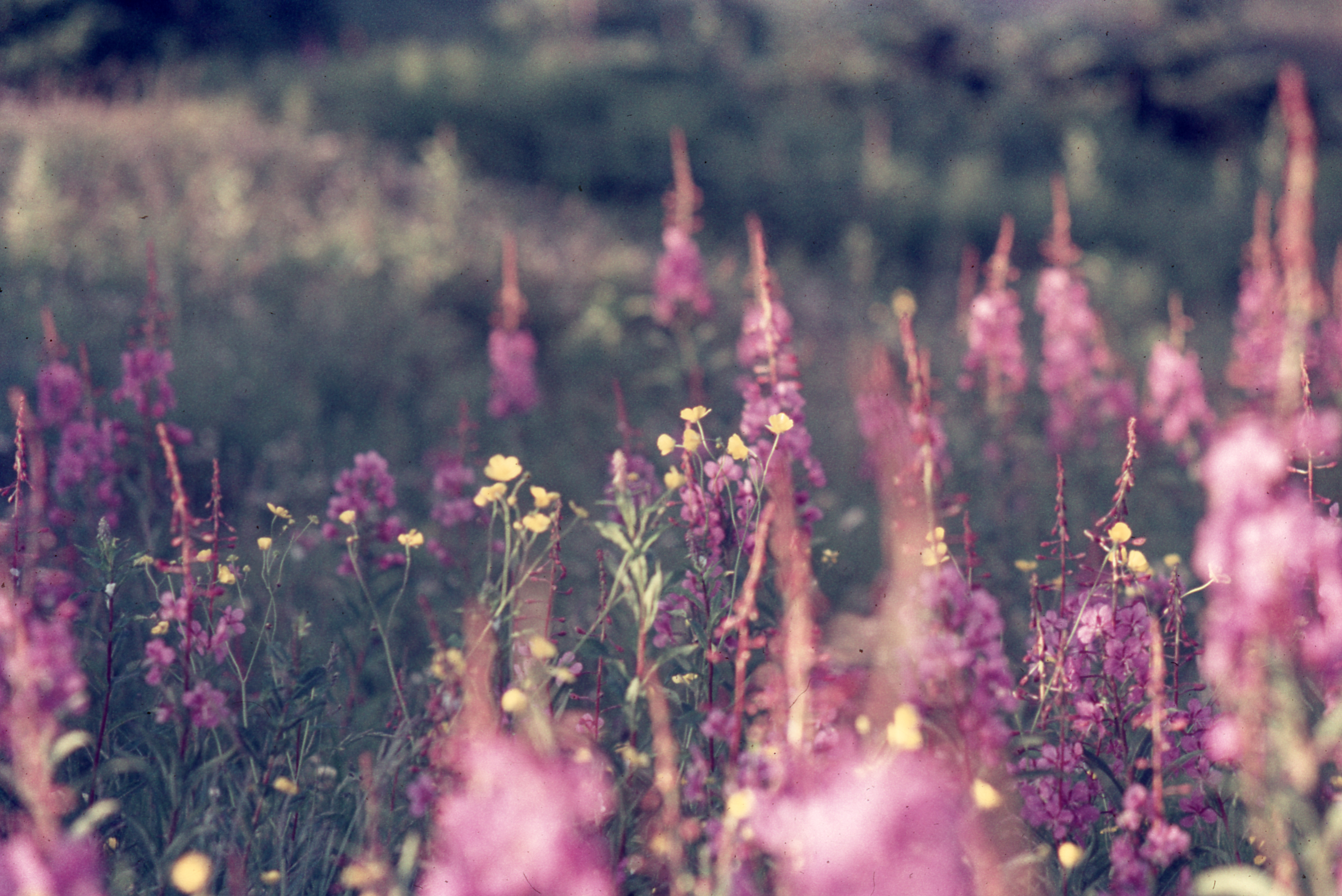
Epilobium angustifolium Linné. — Épilobe à feuilles étroites. — Bouquets rouges. — (Fireweed).

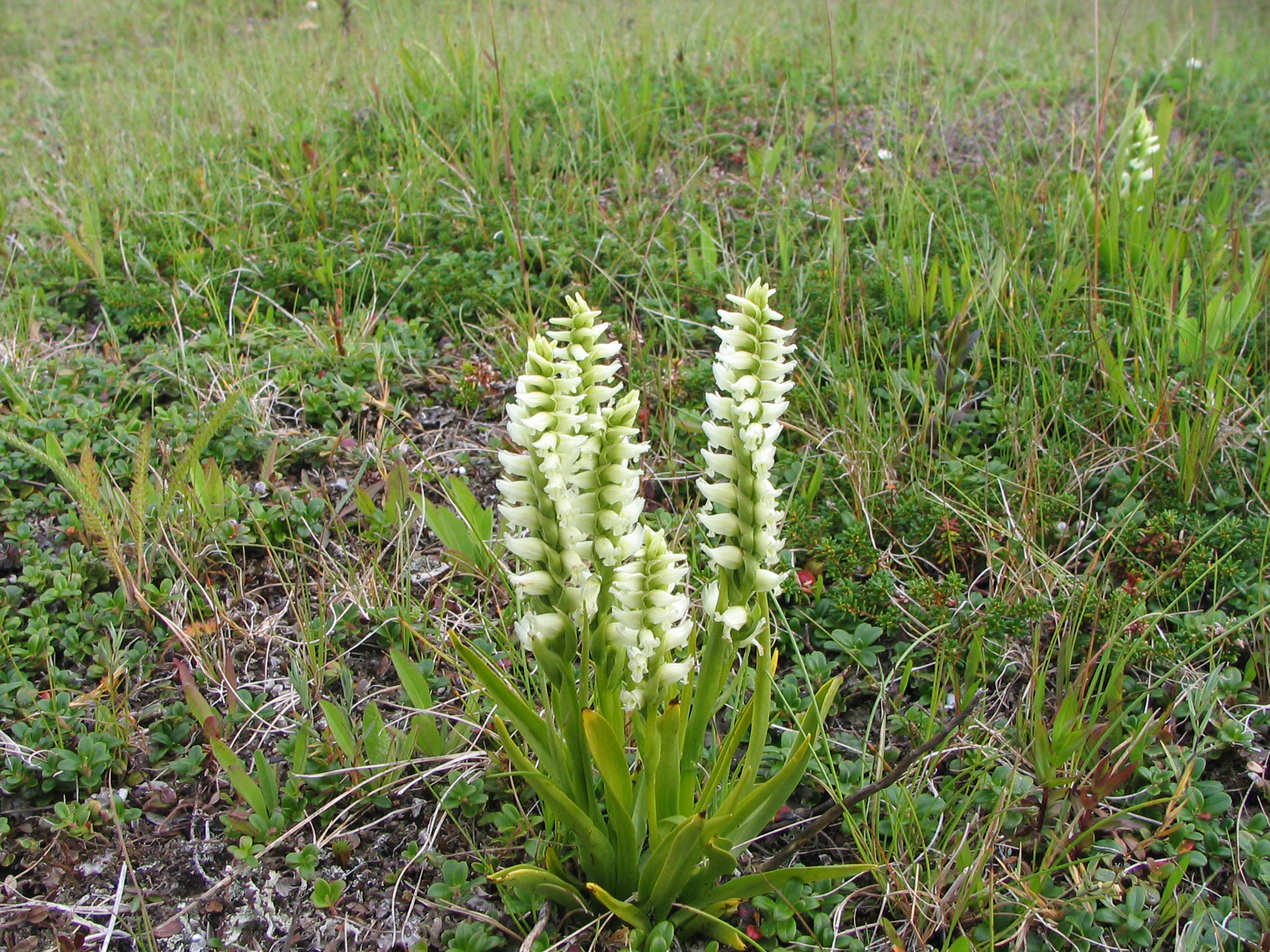
Spiranthes romanzoffiana Chamisso. – Spiranthe de Romanzoff. – (Romanzoff's ladies'-tresses).

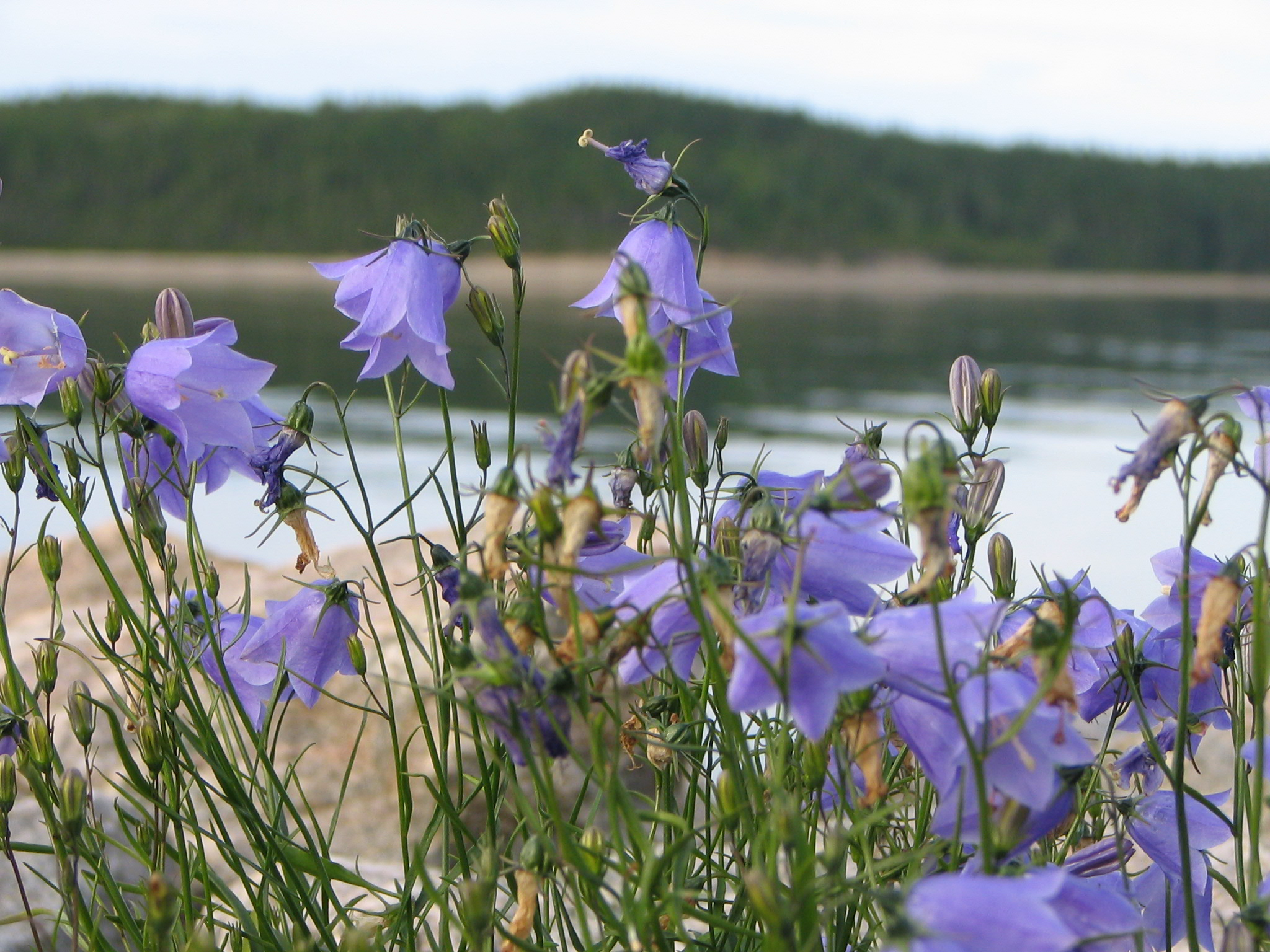
Campanula rotundifolia Linné. – Campanule à feuilles rondes. – (Bluebell).

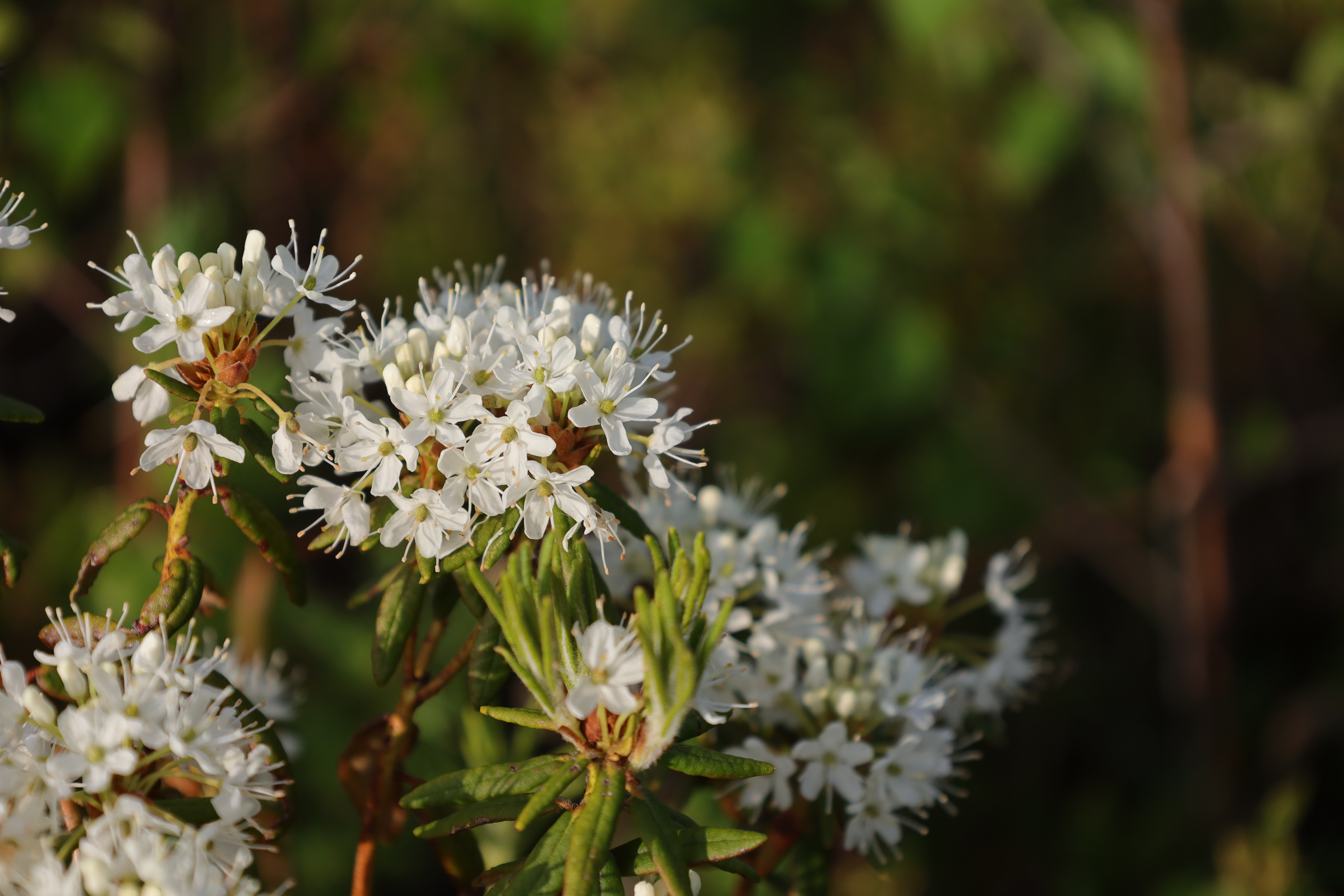
Ledum groenlandicum. — Lédon du Groenland. — Thé du Labrador, Thé velouté. — (Labrador Tea).

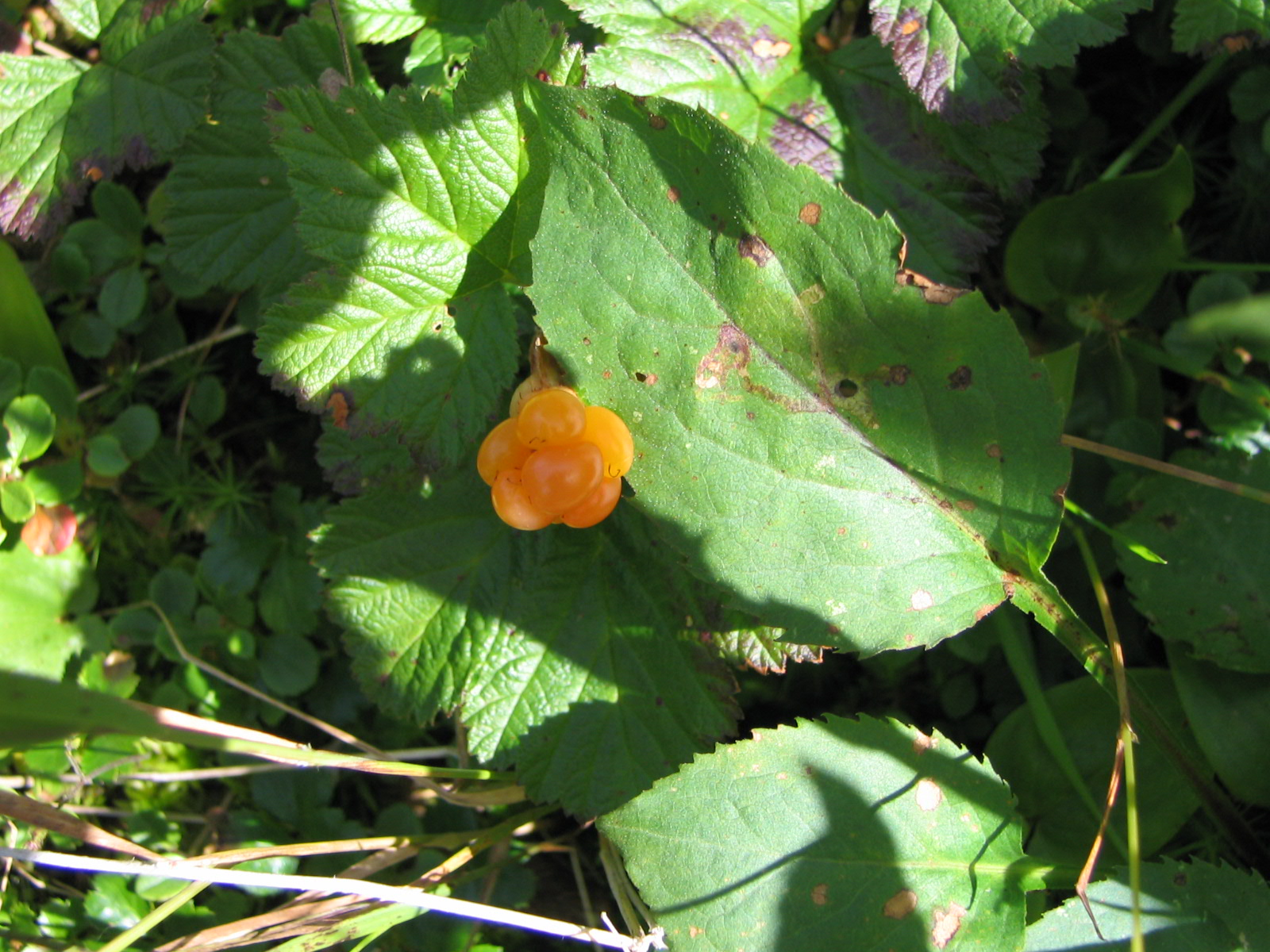
Rubus chamaemorus Linné. — Ronce petit-mûrier. — Mûres blanches, Blackbières, Plaquebières, Chicoutés. — (Cloudberry).

==== Fauna ====
===== Terrestrial mammals =====
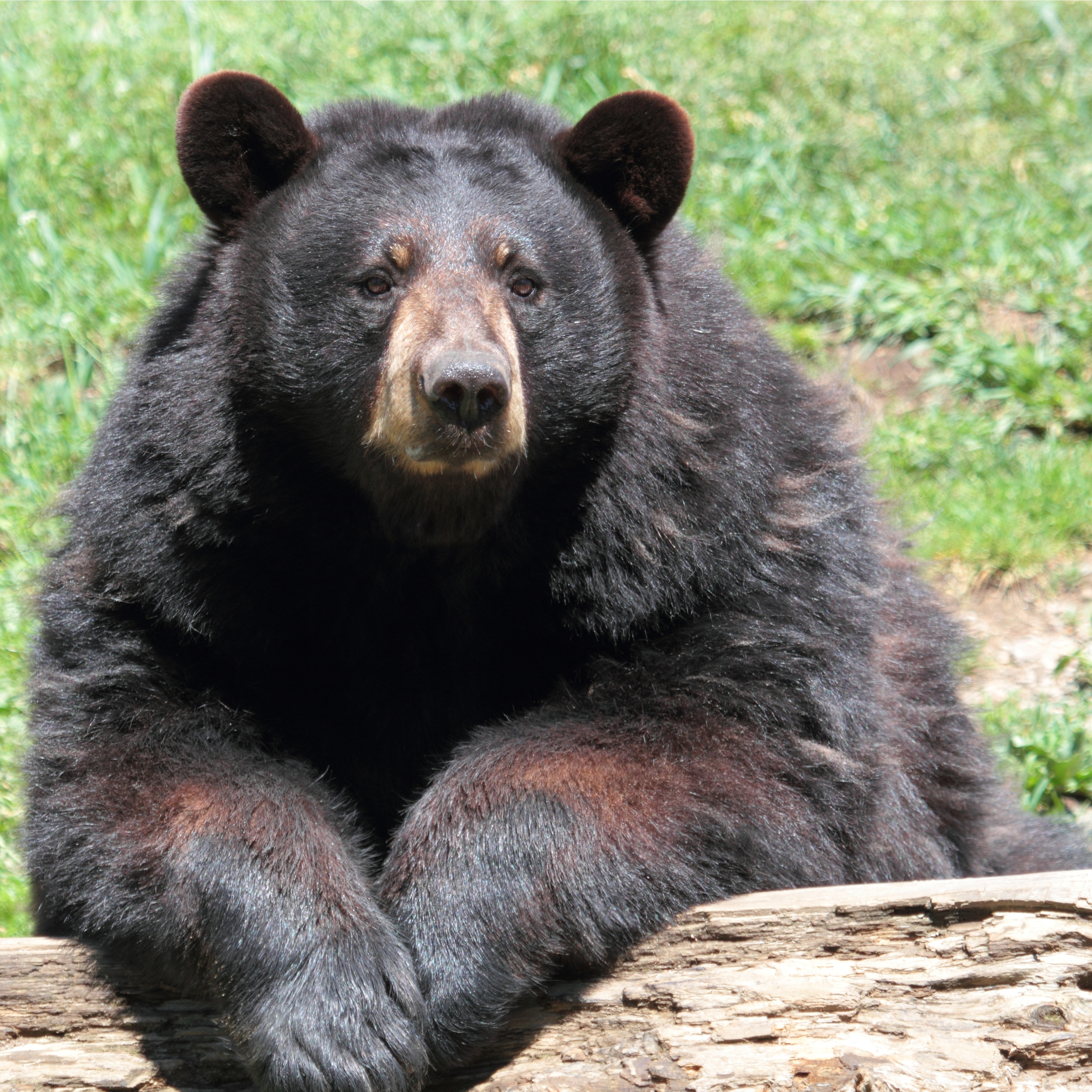
Ursus americanus. - Ours noir. - (Black Bear)

During the summers of 1964 and 1965, during geological research, Jean Depatie with a team of geologists and students, assisted by 3 canoemen and lumberjacks, plus a cook, explored 440 square miles of a territory stretching from Sept-Îles to Blanc Sablon, in the Lac à l'Ours region. In the field, scientists noted an abundance of Canadian beavers, a few otters and American mink, many hares, partridges and a multitude of ducks. Caribou and moose are scarce while black bears and red foxes abound.

- Castor canadensis. -Castor du Canada -North American Beaver.
- Lontra canadensis. – Loutre du Canada. -North American river otter
- Ondatra zibethicus L. – Rat musqué. -Muskrat
- Vulpes vulpes L. -Renard roux. -Red fox
- Tamiasciurus hudsonicus. -Écureil roux - American red squirrel
- Lepus americanus. – Snowhoe hare. Lièvre d’Amérique
- Mustela erminea L. – Stoat. -Hermine
- Ursus americanus. - Ours noir. - (Black Bear)
- Alces alces. Orignal, Élan. -(Moose)
- Certain species of bats and a number of small rodents

===== Marine mammals =====
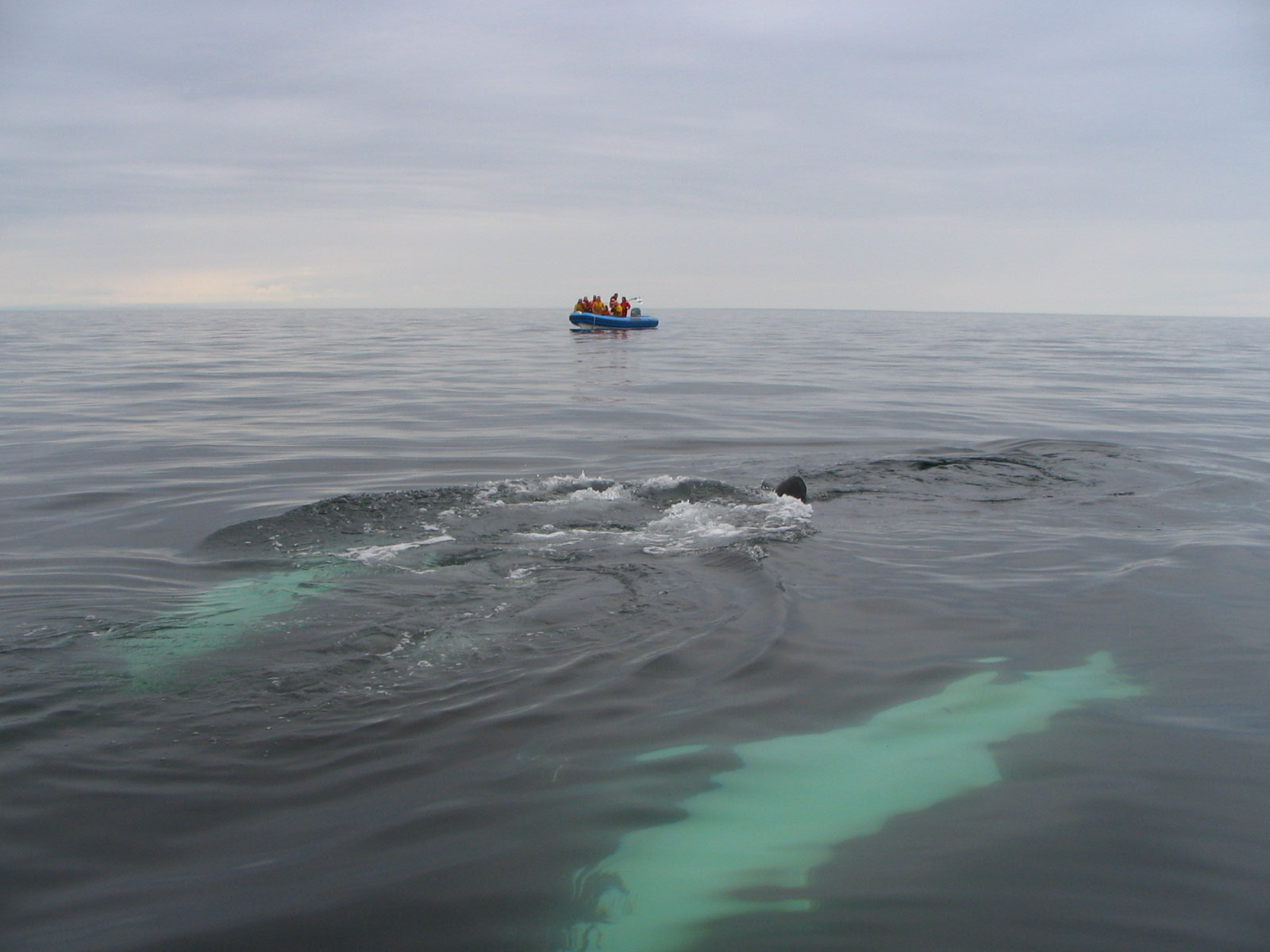
Whale watching, with members of the Mingan Island Cetacean Study (MICS) team 2004

The waters of the St. Lawrence Estuary are internationally recognized as a vital feeding ground for rare or common species of marine mammals.

- Blue whale, Right whale, St. Lawrence beluga, Harbour porpoise, Fin whale, Harbour seal, Humpback whale, Minke whale, Atlantic white-side dolphin, Sperm whale, Grey seal, Harp seal

===== Birds =====
Many species of birds can be observed in the area of Havre-Saint-Pierre and in Mingan Archipelago National Park Reserve

- Warblers, Terns, Ospreys, Passerines, Razorbills, many waders
- Haliaeetus leucocephalus. -Bald Eagle. -Pygargue à tête blanche
- Somateria mollissima. -Common Eider. -Eider à duvet
- Fratercula arctica. Macareux moine. -Atlantic Puffin
- Bucephala islandica. -Barrow's Goldeneye. -Garrot d'Islande' '

=== Climate ===
In spite of its maritime position just above the 50th parallel, Havre-Saint-Pierre has a relatively harsh subarctic climate, with cold winters and cool summers, although the fourth-warmest month of September is relatively close to the 10 °C (50 °F) isotherm to be cold humid continental. The high precipitation brings a lot of snowfall in winter.

Climate data for Havre-Saint-Pierre
Month	Jan	Feb	Mar	Apr	May	Jun	Jul	Aug	Sep	Oct	Nov	Dec	Year
Mean daily maximum °C (°F)	−9.9 (14.2)	−8.3 (17.1)	−2.4 (27.7)	3.9 (39.0)	10.8 (51.4)	16.0 (60.8)	19.6 (67.3)	19.2 (66.6)	14.0 (57.2)	7.5 (45.5)	0.7 (33.3)	−6.4 (20.5)	5.4 (41.7)
Daily mean °C (°F)	−15.5 (4.1)	−14.2 (6.4)	−8.0 (17.6)	−0.3 (31.5)	5.9 (42.6)	11.0 (51.8)	14.6 (58.3)	14.4 (57.9)	9.5 (49.1)	3.6 (38.5)	−3.3 (26.1)	−11.4 (11.5)	0.5 (32.9)
Mean daily minimum °C (°F)	−21.1 (−6.0)	−20.1 (−4.2)	−13.6 (7.5)	−4.5 (23.9)	0.9 (33.6)	5.9 (42.6)	9.5 (49.1)	9.5 (49.1)	4.9 (40.8)	−0.3 (31.5)	−7.2 (19.0)	−16.4 (2.5)	−4.4 (24.1)
Average precipitation mm (inches)	77.4 (3.05)	46 (1.8)	60.5 (2.38)	63.7 (2.51)	87 (3.4)	105.7 (4.16)	99.9 (3.93)	108.6 (4.28)	96.6 (3.80)	118.6 (4.67)	99.4 (3.91)	94.7 (3.73)	1,058 (41.7)
Source: Weatherbase

== Demography ==
=== Population ===
Canada census – Havre-Saint-Pierre community profile

	2021	2016	2011
Population	3,337 (-3.6% from 2016)	3,460 (+1.2% from 2011)	3,418 (+8.5% from 2006)
Land area	2,570.09 km^{2} (992.32 sq mi)	2,817.92 km^{2} (1,088.00 sq mi)	2,821.65 km^{2} (1,089.45 sq mi)
Population density	1.3/km^{2} (3.4/sq mi)	1.2/km^{2} (3.1/sq mi)	1.2/km^{2} (3.1/sq mi)
Median age	47.2 (M: 46.4, F: 48.4)	43.9 (M: 43.1, F: 45.3)	44.2 (M: 43.5, F: 44.5)
Private dwellings	1,655 (total) 1,448 (occupied)	1,641 (total)	1,484 (total)
Median household income	$97,000	$84,992	$.N/A

Notes: 2011 income data for this area has been suppressed for data quality or confidentiality reasons.
References: 2021 2016 2011

Historical Census Data - Havre-Saint-Pierre, Quebec

Year	Pop.	±%
1921	885	—
1931	1,167	+31.9%
1941	1,283	+9.9%
1951	1,856	+44.7%
1956	2,171	+17.0%
1961	2,407	+10.9%

Year	Pop.	±%
1966	2,687	+11.6%
1971	2,998	+11.6%
1976	3,221	+7.4%
1981	3,200	−0.7%
1986	3,344	+4.5%
1991	3,502	+4.7%

Year	Pop.	±%
1996	3,450	−1.5%
2001	3,291	−4.6%
2006	3,150	−4.3%
2011	3,418	+8.5%
2016	3,460	+1.2%
2021	3,337	−3.6%

Source: Statistics Canada

=== Language ===
Canada Census Mother Tongue - Havre-Saint-Pierre, Quebec
Census	Total	French			English			French & English			Other		
Year	Responses	Count	Trend	Pop %	Count	Trend	Pop %	Count	Trend	Pop %	Count	Trend	Pop %
2011	3,315	3,270	▲7.8%	98.64%	25	▲40.0%	0.75%	15	▲ n/a%	0.45%	5	▼85.7%	0.15%
2006	3,065	3,015	▼4.9%	98.37%	15	▼50.0%	0.49%	0	▼100.0%	0.00%	35	▲ n/a%	1.14%
2001	3,210	3,170	▼5.1%	98.75%	30	▲16.7%	0.93%	10	0.0%	0.31%	0	0.0%	0.00%
1996	3,375	3,340	n/a	98.96%	25	n/a	0.74%	10	n/a	0.30%	0	n/a	0.00%

== Economy ==
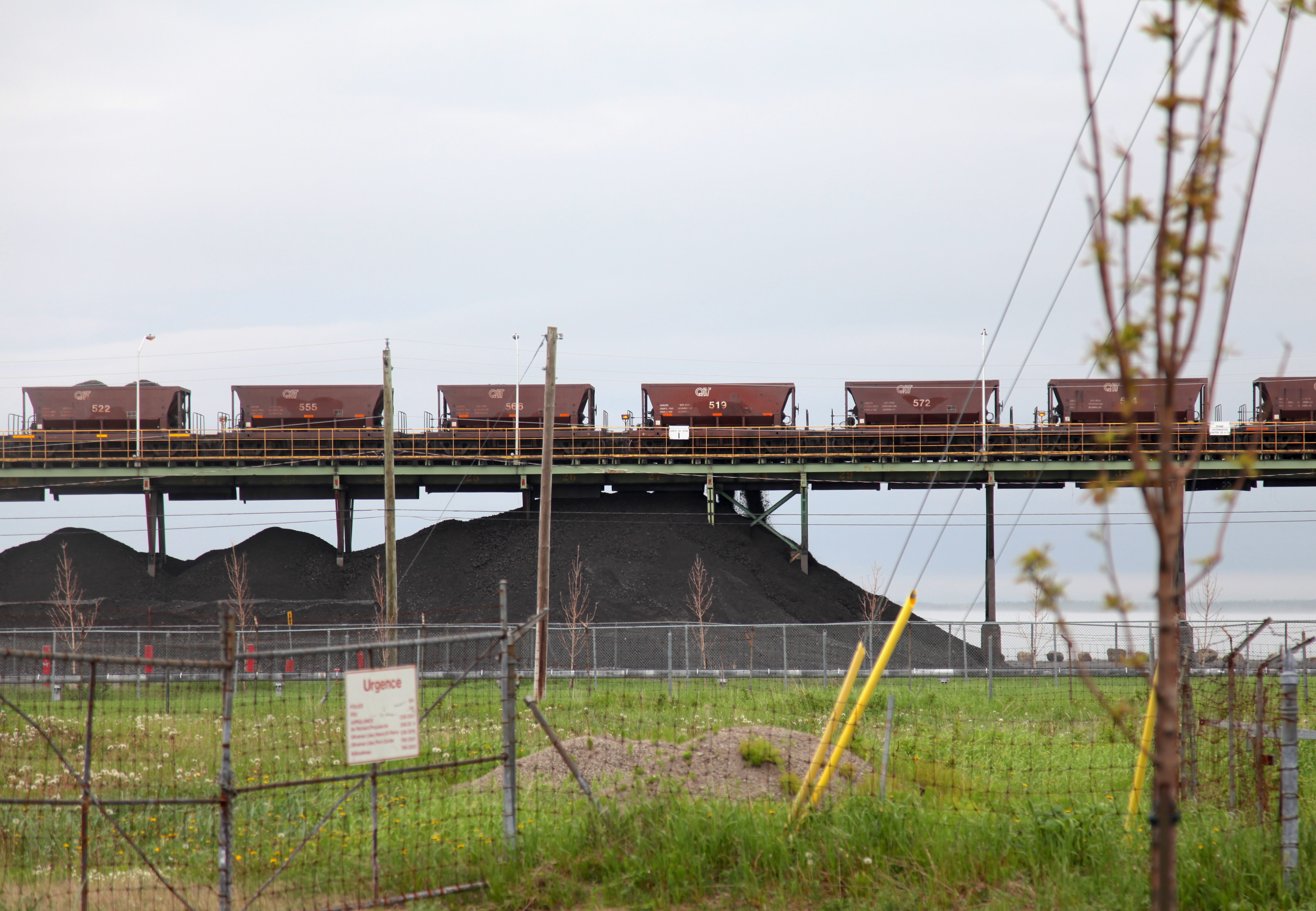
Wagons à Havre-Saint-Pierre - Rio Tinto Fer et Titane, Québec, 2017

The city hospital is the major employer in the region. Havre-Saint-Pierre is also located near Canada's only titanium mine, for which the town serves as a port. Since 1948, the Quebec Iron and Titanium Company mines deposits of ilmenite, a mineral composed of iron and titanium, at a site some 40 km (25 mi) north. Several other mineral exploration companies are operating within the area play surrounding the Lac Tio Titanium Mine, which has been in operation for over 65 years and is currently owned by Rio Tinto. Among the exploration companies is Titan Discovery Corp., which now controls the majority of the mineral exploration rights surrounding the historic Lac Tio mine. The area immediately inland from the town is known to host significant and world-class mineral deposits and is the subject of active mineral exploration and mining. The Chemin de fer de la Rivière Romaine brings it by rail cars to Havre-Saint-Pierre.

=== Tourism ===
Marine transportation from Havre-Saint-Pierre or Longue-Pointe-de-Mingan is required to visit the islands of the Mingan Archipelago National Park Reserve. It is possible to spend the night there. Private companies offer guided excursions, they also offer packages for sea kayaking expeditions, with transport by boat on the way back if the weather conditions are unfavourable. Paddle boards with equipment are available for rent. Parks Canada recommends some marine carriers.'

It is noted for the unique variety of flora and fauna to be found there, such as puffins and the rare Mingan Thistle, and for the unique geological features on many of the islands, which are referred to as "monoliths".

The waters of the St. Lawrence Estuary is the host to one of the largest whale and marine mammals watching industries in the world.'

=== Fishing ===
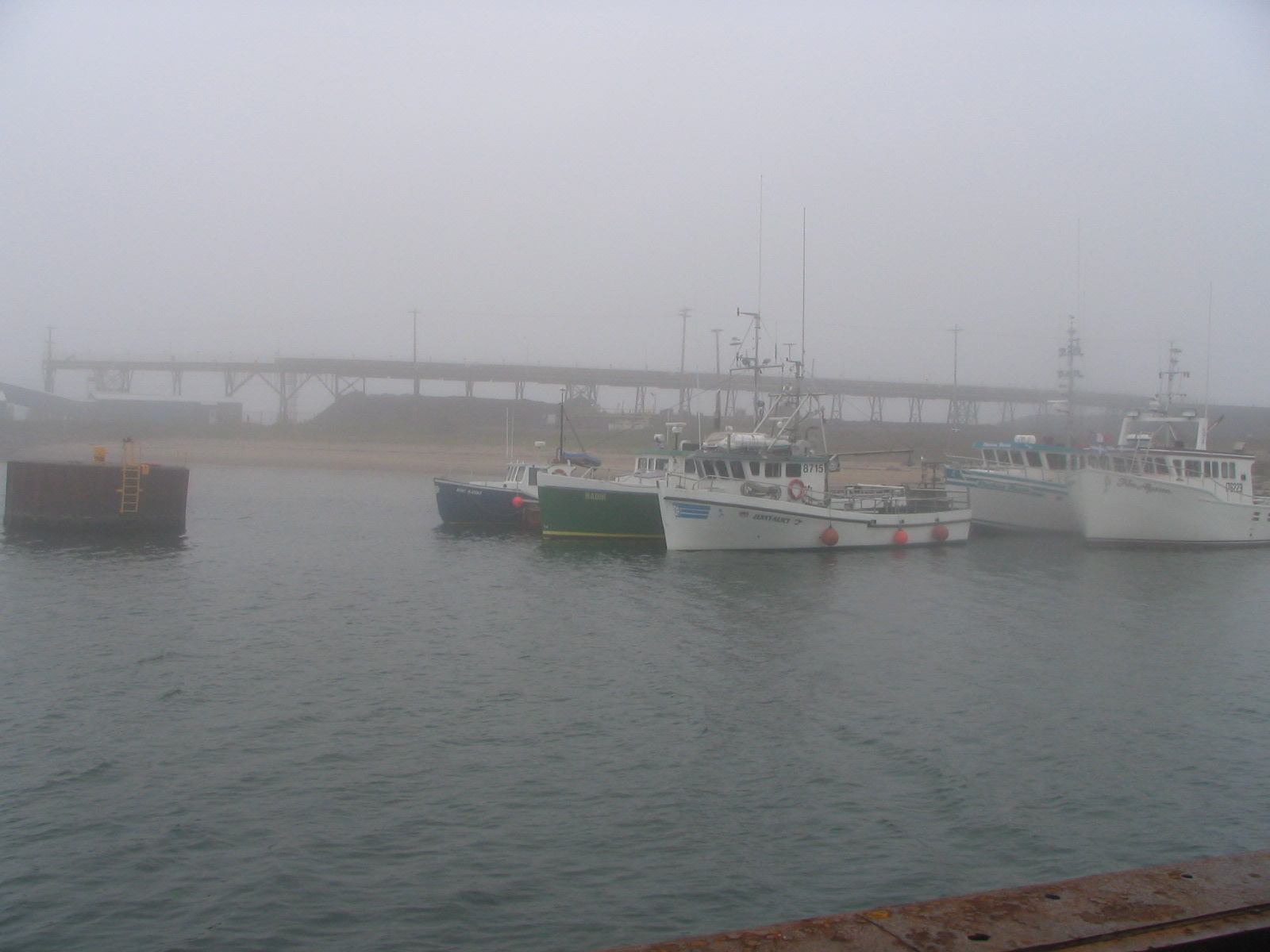
Fishing boats and mineral port facilities

Including all of the gulf coast of the St. Lawrence between Pointe-des-Monts (Baie-Trinité) and Blanc-Sablon, as well as the coasts of Anticosti Island area, the waters is renowned for fishing, catching northern lobster, whelk, Atlantic cod, Atlantic herring, Greenland halibut, capelin, rainbow smelt, snow crab, as well as Atlantic salmon and trout in the many lakes and rivers of the North Shore. Only a few of the approximately 100 species of marine algae, 1000 invertebrate species and 80 fish species in the gulf are exploited by humans.

== Transportation ==
=== Route 138 ===
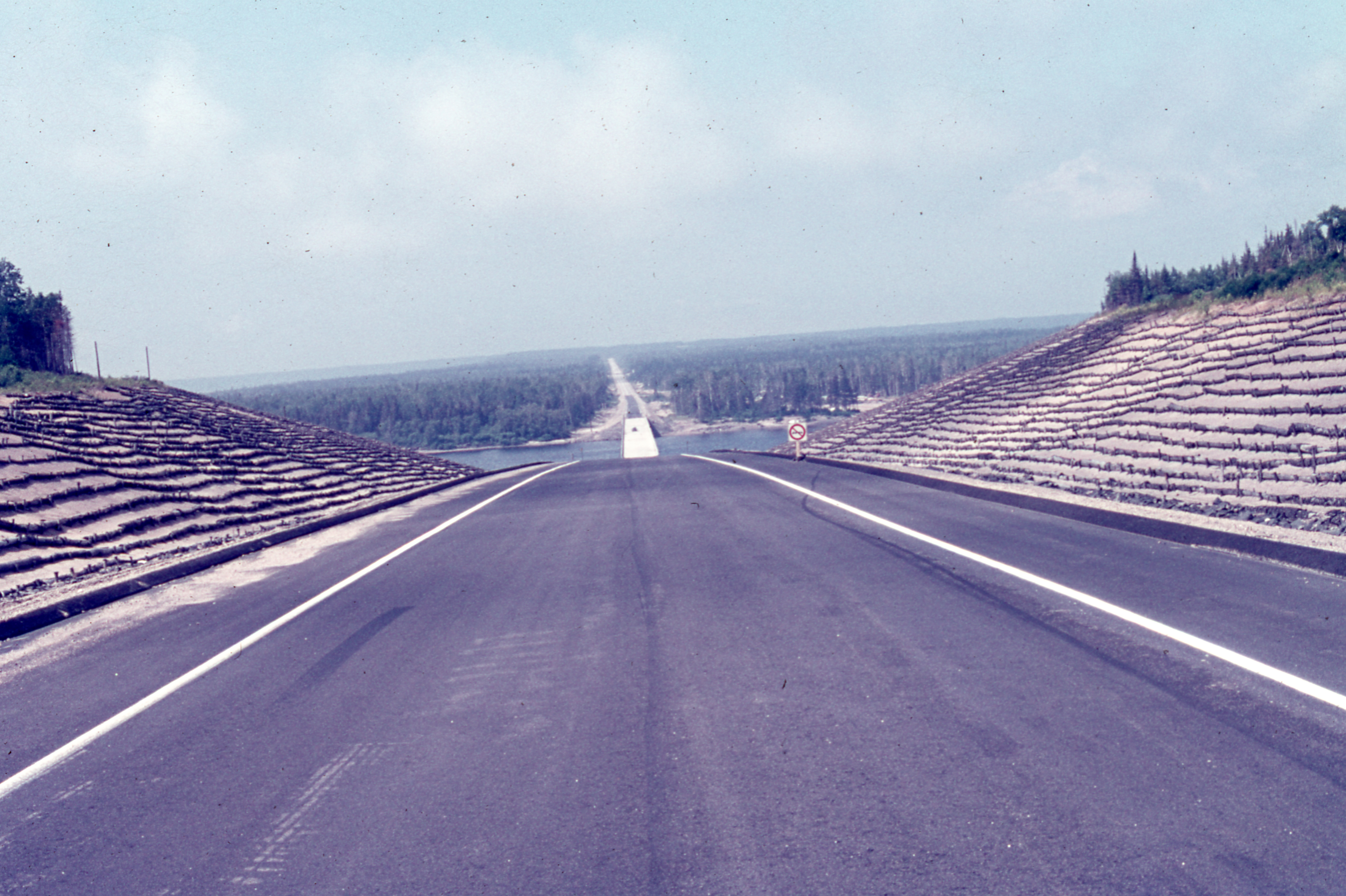
Route 138 East, Donald Gallienne Bridge over the Moisie River, from the hamlet of Matamec, towards Moisie

At the beginning of the 20th century, the first routes of what would become Route 138 (formerly Route 15) were laid in the vicinity of Sept-Îles. In 1961, a section was added from the Franquelin region to the tip of the Moisie River, some 20 kilometres east of Sept-Îles.

On the north shore of the Gulf of St. Lawrence, until 1976, there was no continuous route to go further east than the Moisie River. Only bits of paths connect a few coastal villages to each other, Natashquan connects to Aguanish by a dirt road (1959).

The section of Route 138, from the Moisie River to Havre-Saint-Pierre, opened in the spring of 1976, from there access to the islands of the Mingan Archipelago by sea.

In 1984, to commemorate the 450th anniversary of Jacques Cartier's arrival in New France, the Commission de toponymie named Route Jacques-Cartier to the part of Route 138 located east of the Saguenay River, from Tadoussac to Havre-Saint-Pierre.

=== Land - Air - Sea ===
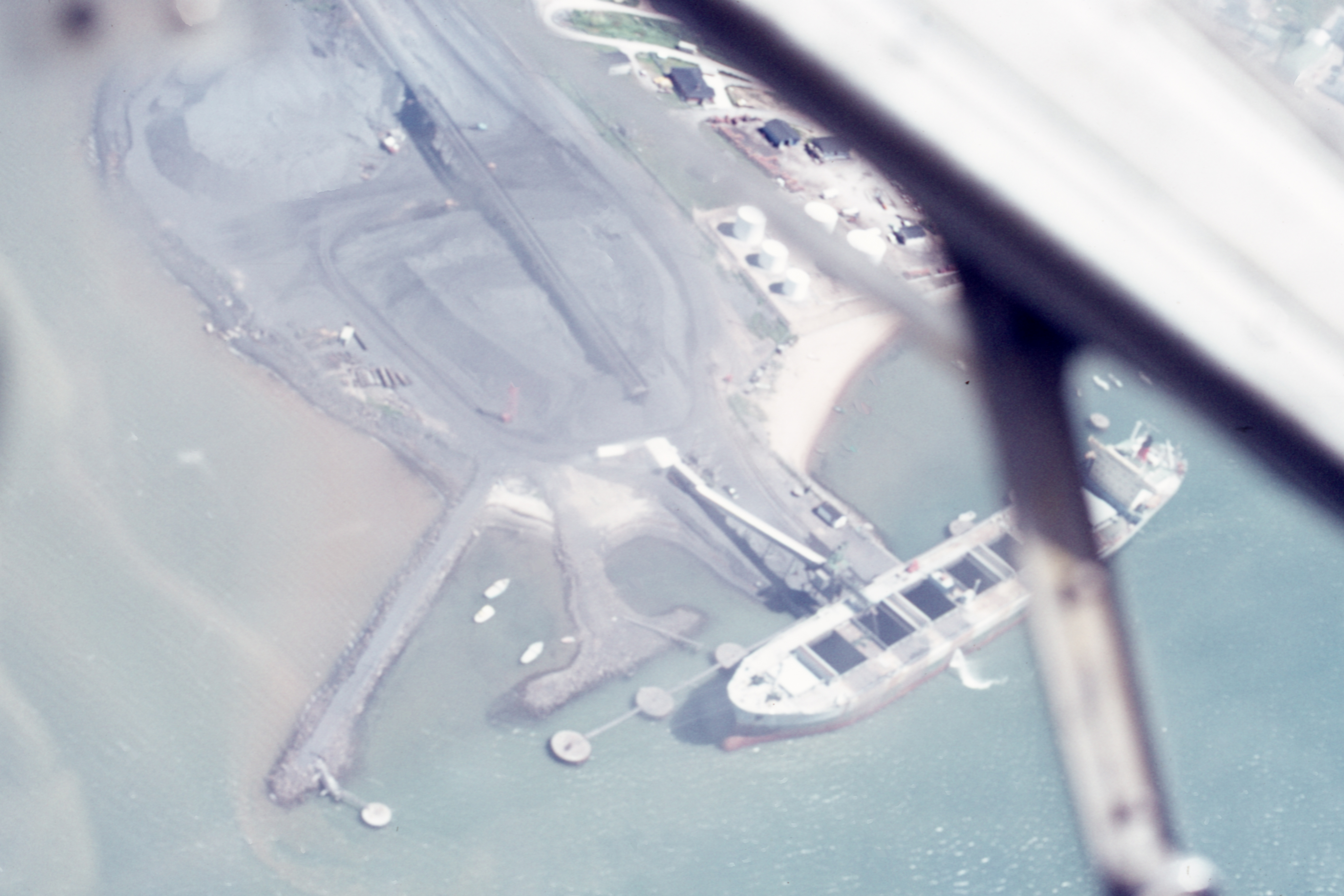
Ore carrier at the wharf of the Rio Tinto Iron and Titanium Quebec

The Rio Tinto Iron and Titanium Company (RTFF) owns the easternmost of the ore ports on the North Shore in Havre-Saint-Pierre. Its installation, between 1948 and 1950, included a mining shaft at Tio and Allard lakes, the construction of a 43 km railway line between this sector and Havre-Saint-Pierre, and the installation of a marine terminal

- Crossing Anticosti Island – Lower North Shore, the Bella-Desgagnés makes several stopovers, including Havre-Saint-Pierre and Port-Menier
- Air Saguenay, the Havre-Saint-Pierre seaplane base, cease operations on November 27, 2019.
- Air Tunilik, air transport, Havre-Saint-Pierre seaplane base, founded in 2002
- Havre-Saint-Pierre Airport connects Gaspé, Montreal, Ivujivik, Îles-de-la-Madeleine, Waskaganish, Schefferville, Salluit, Rouyn Noranda as well as destinations in Labrador (2024)
- The port of Havre-Saint-Pierre can accommodate ships, large-scale barges, national and international cruise ships, fishing and pleasure boats
- Fédération des clubs de motoneigistes du Québec, 14 clubs, 2,320 km of trails in coniferous forests, taiga and tundra

=== Navigation ===
As is often the case on the middle and lower North Shore islands, in the Mingan Archipelago, the combination of irregular seabeds and strong tidal currents sometimes makes navigation perilous. On the Mingan Banks, in the Jacques Cartier Strait, Anticosti Island and the North Shore form a large funnel where the easterly wind creates, among other things, an impressive swell.

Along the Lower North Shore, it is only from Johan Beetz Bay to Kegaska that the coastline is continuous and the water is quite deep. At ebb tide, the high flow of the rivers of the North Shore often creates very difficult, if not clearly dangerous, seas.

Ports of the Gulf of St. Lawrence, on the Côte-Nord Shore: Blanc-Sablon, Harrington Harbor, Natashquan, Havre-Saint-Pierre, Mingan, Port-Menier (Anticosti Island), Cap-aux-Meules (Îles-de-la-Madeleine).

== Notable residents ==
- Roland-Benoît Jomphe, CM CQ, poet
- Jean-François Jomphe, NHL ice hockey player, was born in Havre-Saint-Pierre

== See also ==
- List of municipalities in Quebec
