= Port d'Ehoala =

Coordinates: 25°04′12″S 46°57′00″E

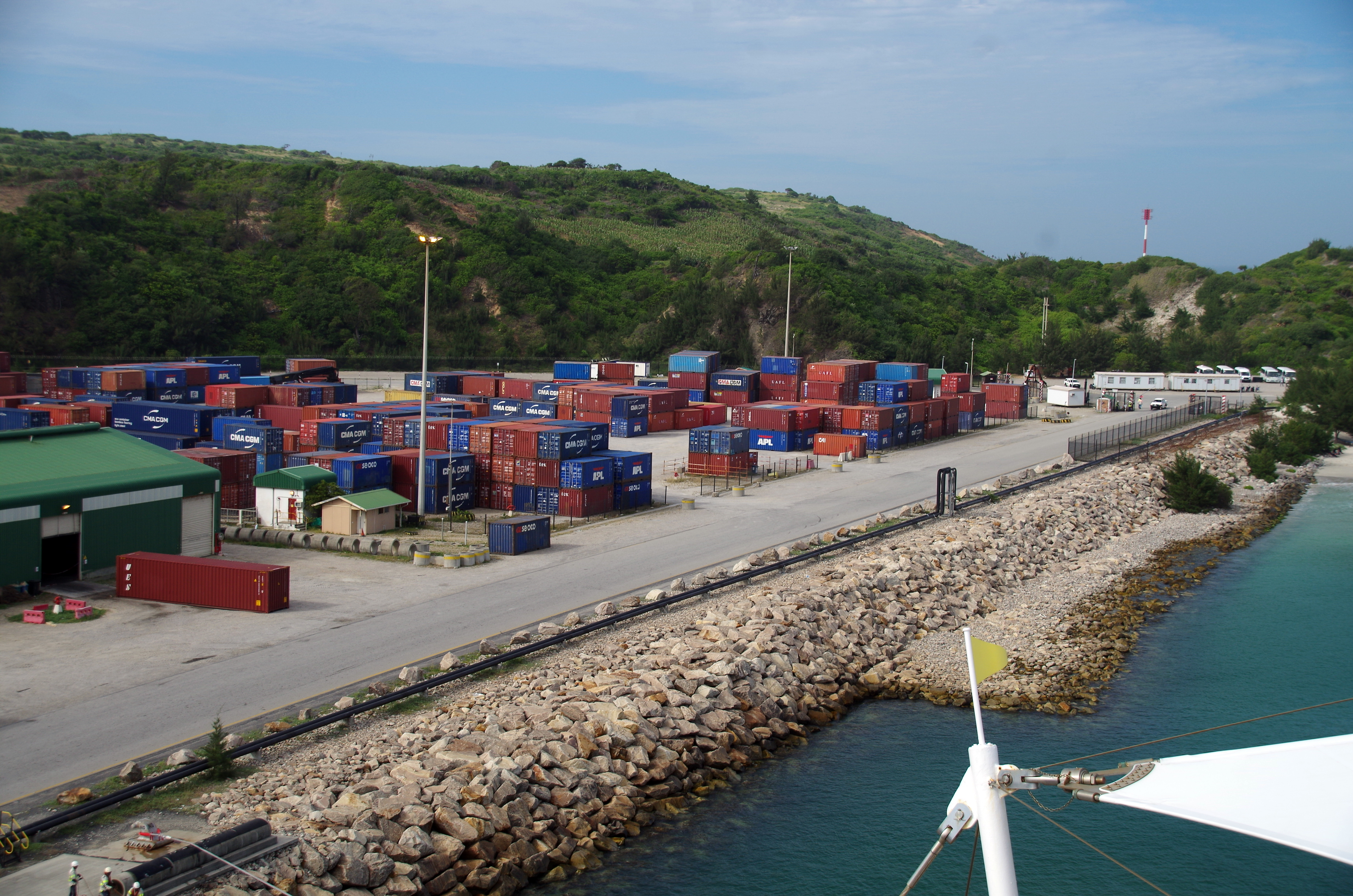
- Port d'Ehoala
- Click on the map for a fullscreen view

Location
- Country: Madagascar
- Location: Fort-Dauphin (Madagascar), Anosy

Details
- Opened: 2009
- Operated by: Port d'Ehoala SA
- Owned by: Rio Tinto / QMM
- Type of harbour: Artificial
- No. of wharfs: 3

Statistics
- Main trades: Ilmenite
- Website www.ehoalaport.com

The Port d'Ehoala is a port in southern Madagascar at approx. 10 km from the city of Tôlanaro (Fort-Dauphin).

It was built for the exportations of Ilmenite from the nearby mine of QIT Madagascar Minerals and opened on July 8, 2009.
