= Lake Besaroy =

- Location: near Fort Dauphin, in Madagascar
- Coordinates: 24.9712°S 47.0305°E
- Type: Lake
- Max. length: 4 km (2.5 mi)
- Max. width: 2.5 km (1.6 mi)

Lake Besaroy is a waterbody near Fort Dauphin in Madagascar.

== Description ==
The lake is close to the Indian Ocean and connected to Lake Ambavarno.

== History ==
Between December 2014 and January 2015, 117 metres of the lake was contaminated by mining activities undertaken by QIT Madagascar Minerals.

== See also ==
- List of lakes of Madagascar
