= List of lakes of Madagascar =

This is a List of lakes of Madagascar.

== A ==
- Lake Andraikiba
- Lake Alaotra
- Lake Anosy
- Lake Alanampotsy
- Lake Amparihibe
- Lake Alarobia
- Lake Andranobe
- Lake Andranomavoina

== B ==
Lake Besaroy

== E ==
Lake Eria

== F ==
Lake Fanolana

== H ==
Hima lake

== I ==
- Lake Itasy
- Lake Ihotry

== K ==
Lake Karana - Lake Kinkony

== M ==
Manjakatompo Lake - Manampana Lake - Lake Mantasoa - Lake Mandrozo - Lake Masay - Lake Masihanaka - Lake Mavo - Lake Morongara

== R ==
Lake Ravelobe - Rangazavaka lake

== S ==
Lake Sahambavy - Lake Sariaka

== T ==
Lake Tampolo - Lake Tatamarina - Lake Tsimbazaza - Lake Tsimanampetsotsa - Lake Tritriva
