= Mandena mine =

Madagascar Mining company

- The mine's wet plant in the mining pond

- Mine's location in Madagascar
- Location: Taolagnaro, Fort Dauphin, Taolagnaro, Fort Dauphin, Anosy; 24°57′32″S 47°00′51″E
- Products: Ilmenite
- Type: open-pit
- Discovered: 1986
- Active: 1986-present
- Company: (Rio Tinto Group subsidiary) QIT-Fer et Titane 80% Government of Madagascar 20%
- Website: www.riotinto.com/en/operations/madagascar/qit-madagascar-minerals

Local impacts
- Pollution: uranium, lead
- Impacted: Lake Besaroy

Mandena mine (also Mandena operation, Mandena concession, or the QMM mine) is an ilmenite mine operated by Rio Tinto subsidiary QIT Madagascar Minerals (QMM). It is located near Taolagnaro, Fort Dauphin, Anosy region, Madagascar.

The mine was first discovered in 1986 in an environmentally fragile and important region. Mining activity has been met with mixed reactions from the local community, with some protesting in 2013 and 2022.

Pollution from the mine reached nearby Lake Besaroy in 2014 and 2015, before the mine's owners admitted there was no tailing dam on site. Rio Tino promised to improve the environmental protection at the mine in 2004, but walked that promise back in 2016.

== Description ==
Mandena is a titanium dioxide ore, and ilmenite mine on the Mandena concession, 5km northeast of Taolagnaro, Fort Dauphin. It is located in littoral forests, near Andohahela National Park and the Mandena Conservation Zone.

The mine's initial capacity was projected at 750,000 tonnes per year, with future phases of development potentially expanding capacity to 2,000,000 tonnes per year. The mine is 80% owned by Canadian mining company QIT-Fer et Titane, a wholly owned subsidiary of the mining company Rio Tinto Group; the remaining 20% is owned by the Government of Madagascar.

== History ==
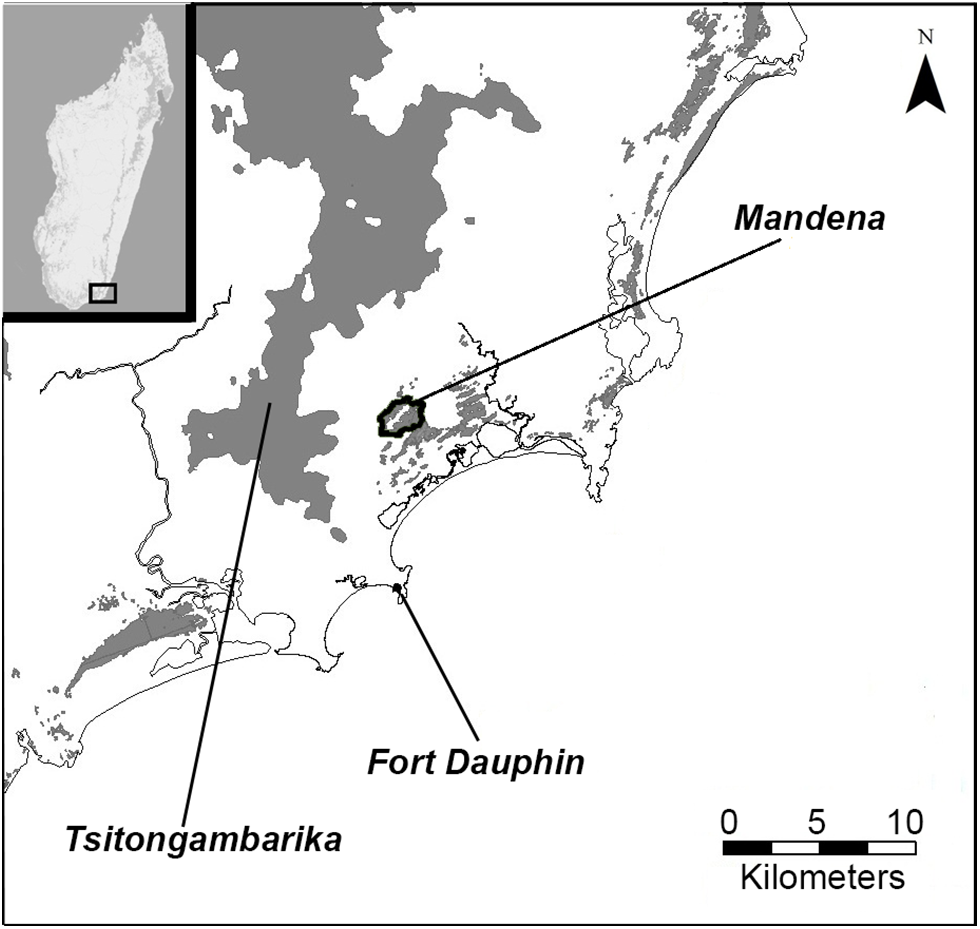
Map of Mandena Conservation Zone

Rio Tinto discovered an estimated 70 million tons of ilmenite in what Scientific American magazine called "one of the most threatened ecosystems on the planet" in 1986. The mine's development created employment, roads and exacerbated ongoing deforestation.

At the International Union for Conservation of Nature’s World Conservation Congress conference in Bangkok in 2004, Rio Tino promised to improve its efforts to protect the ecology, launching what it called a net positive impact strategy, with Mandena mine as the company's first priority. In 2016, after members of the company's Biodiversity Committee pointed out gaps between promises and action, Rio Tinto abandoned that promise, switching strategies towards what Scientific American described as "avoiding making things too much worse" and projected that the company was "poised to extinguish this biodiversity hotspot". The committee resigned in October 2016, issuing an open letter critical of Rio Tinto, that stated "mention of the environment is totally absent from the five stated corporate priorities of Rio Tinto." and expressing a "lack of confidence that adequate long-term resourcing and capacity will be provided for the biodiversity program at QMM."

In January 2013, community protests about the mine were quelled by the Madagascar People's Armed Forces who used teargas to disperse the crowd. Rio Tinto attributed the protests to earlier cash compensation from the mine's owners, claiming that the community sought additional compensation. Local activists complained that mine employees were 90% not local, a claim rejected by Rio Tinto. The mine's Independent Advisory Panel resigned the same year.

Between December 2014 and January 2015, mining activity breached a buffer zones between their operations and Lake Besaroy. The National Office for the Environment described the impact as "negligible". Local organisations complained about not being able to see the assessment that led to the office's conclusion. News website Mongabay questioned the office's ability to regulate Rio Tinto.

In 2019, analysis by the Andrew Lees Trust discovered uranium concentrations in the river downstream of the mine were 0.049 mg/L, 63% higher than the World Health Organisation (WHO) guidelines for drinking water, while Lead concentrations were 0.0256 mg/L, 256% higher than the WHO recommended maximum for drinking water. The same year, Rio Tinto admitted there was no tailings dam on site.

In 2021, Rio Tinto signed an agreement to buy electricity from an independent power producer. The facility will combine 8MW of solar, 12MW of onshore wind and a battery energy storage system to provide renewable power to the mine.

In 2021, analysis by activists found that some sites downstream of the mine had uranium at 52 times the World Health Organization drinking water standard, and lead contamination at 42 times the standard.

In 2022, the mine stopped operating for five days due to protests. Protestors linked a release of water from the mine to the death of fish, a claim denied by Rio Tinto. Two tailings dams at the mine released one million cubic metres of mine water into the local waterways.

In 2026, QIT decided to stop production again due to blockades of the road that accesses the site

== See also ==
- Environmental effects of mining
- Mining industry of Madagascar
