= QIT-Fer et Titane =

Canadian mining company

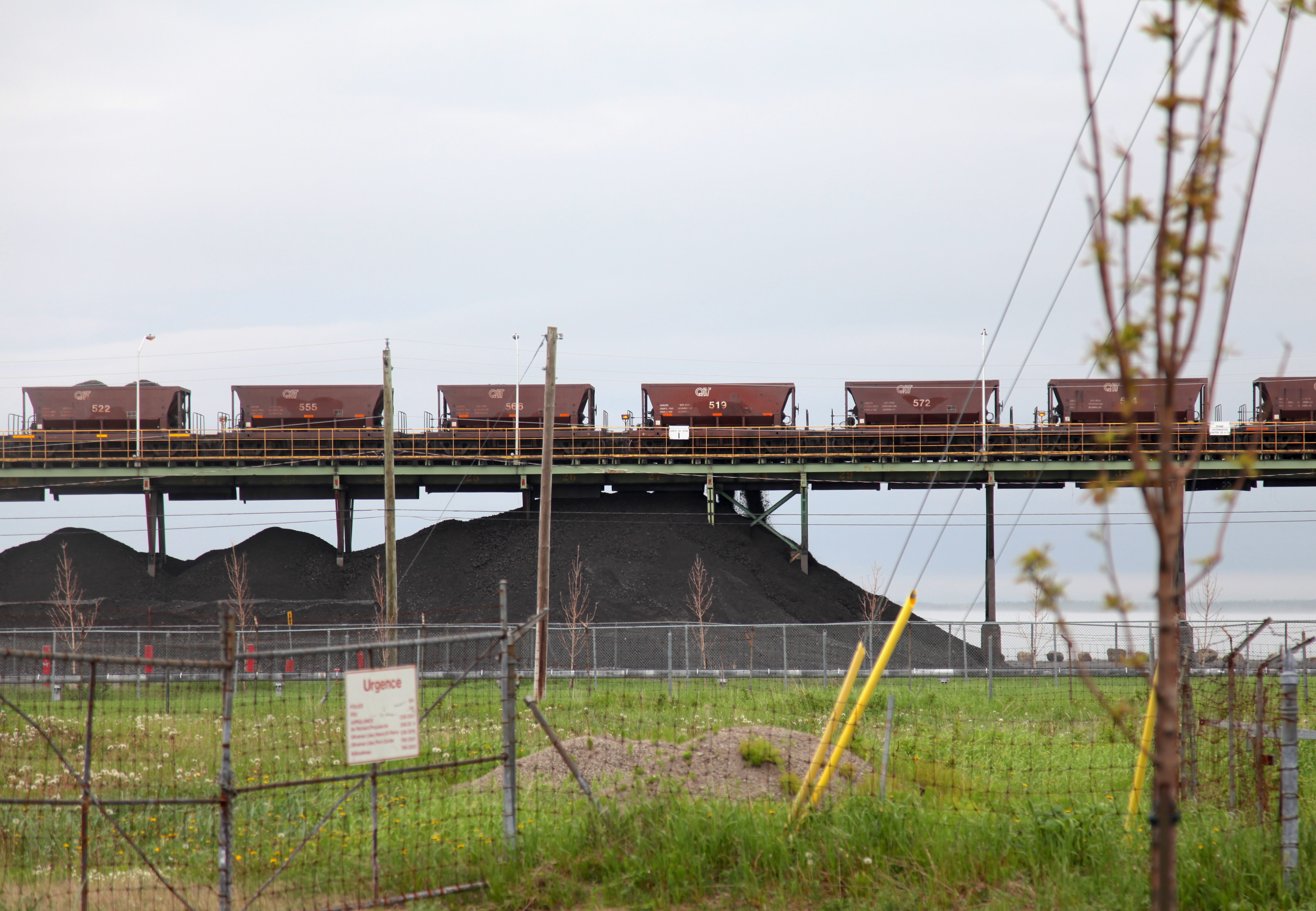

QIT-Fer et Titane (QIT from its old name "Quebec Iron and Titanium") is a Canadian mining company located in Quebec. The company operates an ilmenite (titanium oxide ore) mine at Lac Allard (aka Lake Tio) in northern Quebec, and in the southern Quebec municipality of Sorel-Tracy operates refining facilities that produce titanium dioxide, pig iron, steel, and other metal products.

== History ==
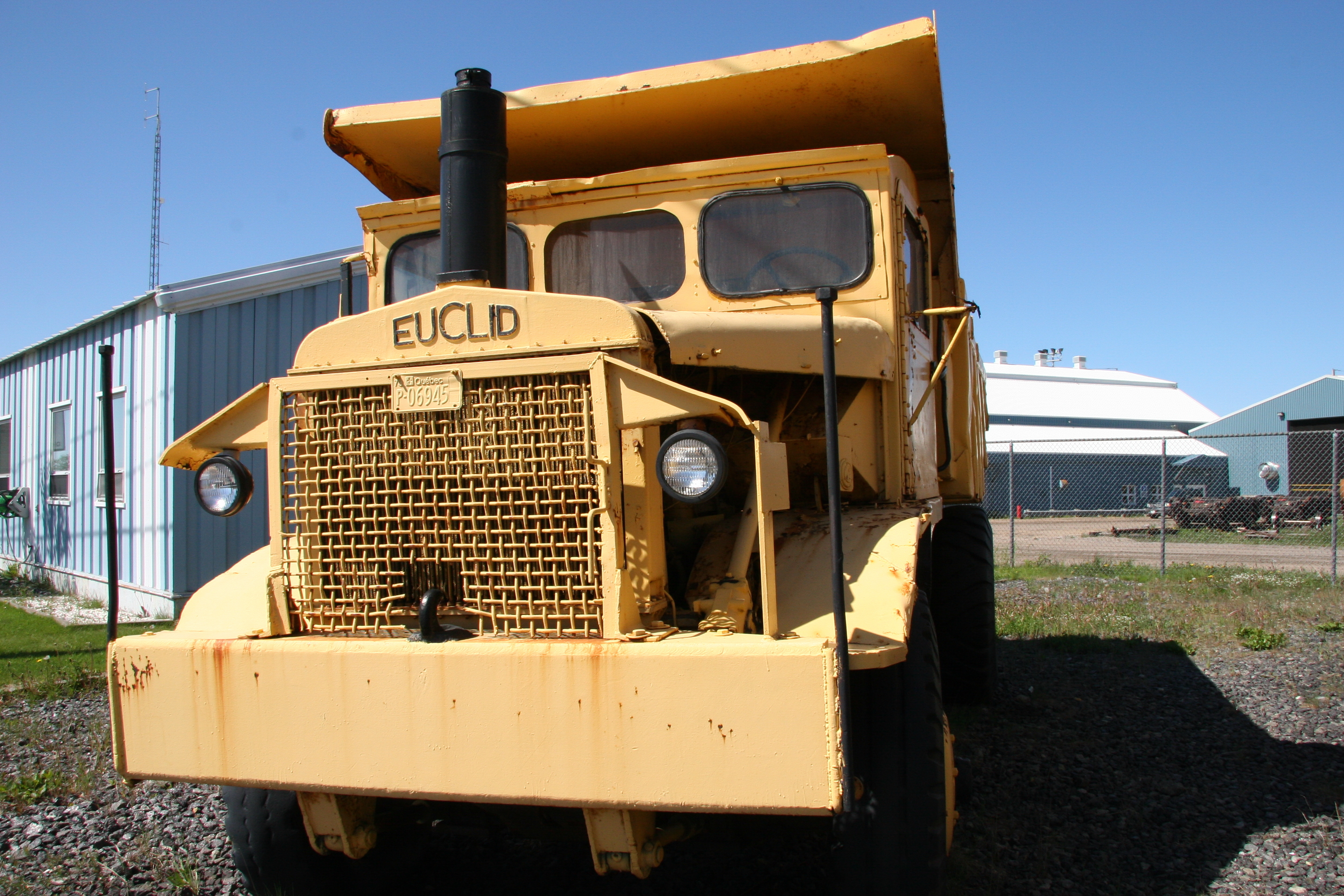
Euclid haul truck, property of the mine that uses Havre St Pierre

In 1856 prospectors found some potential in the region of Lac Allard. In 1941, the government of Quebec discovered additional resources in the area, and in 1946 after two years of exploration Kennco Explorations, the Canadian subsidiary of Kennecott, found an ore body. In 1950 the mine at Lac Allard was opened. Difficulties in the smelting process delayed the plant at Sorel until 1957.

The smelter uses a development of the 1940 sulfate process to produce titanium dioxide; the iron is a by-product.

As of 1976, QIT was responsible for the development of an ilmenite mine in northeast South Africa, called Zulti South and Zulti North Richards Bay Minerals in KwaZulu-Natal.

As of 1977 the firm was 2/3 owned by Kennecott Copper and 1/3 owned by New Jersey Zinc, a unit of Gulf and Western Industries.

In 1981 after a worldwide fall in copper prices, Standard Oil of Ohio (SOHIO) acquired Kennecott. In 1987, BP acquired SOHIO, and Kennecott became part of BP Minerals America. In 1989, Rio Tinto Zinc purchased mining assets from BP.

In the late 20th century QIT was part of a group of 50 polluters that reduced their effluent by 90%, as part of a government effort to clean up the St Lawrence River.

In 1996 QIT developed a product it called UGS, which has a 94.5% TiO_{2} composition. Calcium and manganese are leached out of the titanium metal in the final step by this process. SiO_{2} (1.95%) and Fe_{2}O_{3} (1.17%) are the two most prevalent impurities after this process. UGS stands for Up Graded Slag, and is a form of synthetic rutile.

In March 2004 the president of QIT was Pat Fiore, and he was concerned that at the time his operation was supplying 15% of the market, and running at 70% capacity because of the closure of three clients over the previous 15 years. That year, the industry had an overcapacity of 600,000 tonnes. Fiore complained that at least one of his competitors has a plant with no heating expense, because the plant is located in Africa.

In 2008 Hatch partnered with QIT to expand the UGS plant to a capacity of 375,000 tonnes per year.

As of 2009, the company is a wholly owned subsidiary of mining firm Rio Tinto. In this year QIT obtained the first ore from Madagascar.

== Operations ==
=== Quebec ===
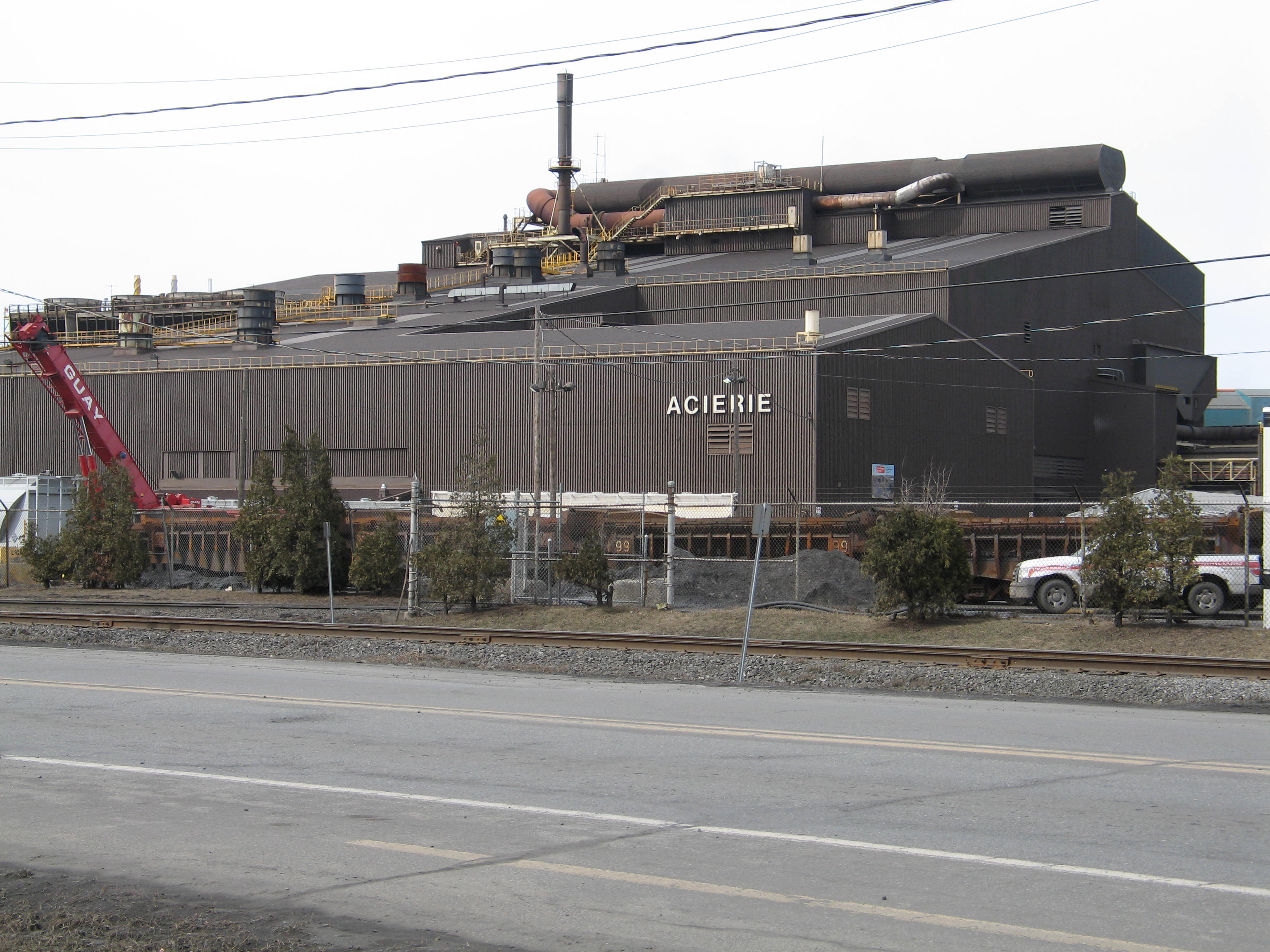
Rio Tinto plant in Sorel Quebec

QIT operates a 26-mile (42 km) railway line, the Chemin de fer de la Rivière Romaine, from its mine to the port of Havre-Saint-Pierre on the St. Lawrence River. The line carries mined ore as well as passenger trains for workers and serves as the only access route to the mine.

As of 2008, the company employed more than 1,400 people at its plant in Sorel-Tracy, which also houses a research centre and the company’s head office. The company was the first in the world to remove iron from ilmenite on a commercial scale.

As of 2008, the annual production capacity of the plant was 1,100,000 metric tons (1,200,000 short tons) SORELSLAG titanium slag, 250,000 metric tons (280,000 short tons) UGS™ titanium slag, 600,000 metric tons (660,000 short tons) liquid iron, 360,000 metric tons (400,000 short tons) pig iron, 500,000 metric tons (550,000 short tons) SORELSTEEL and 200,000 metric tons (220,000 short tons) metal powders.

=== Madagascar ===
The company has a majority ownership of QIT Madagascar Minerals, the operator of the Mandena mine (for ilmenite) in Fort Dauphin, Anosy, Madagascar, with which it augments its Lac Allard feed. The concession for Mandena was granted in 1986.
