= Boriziny-Vaovao District =

Boriziny-Vaovao Port-Bergé
- District
- Location within Madagascar
- Coordinates: 15.567°S 47.621°E
- Country: Madagascar
- Region: Sofia

Area
  - Total: 2,737 sq mi (7,088 km^{2})

Population (2020)
  - Total: 248,906
  - Density: 90.95/sq mi (35.12/km^{2})
- Post code: 419

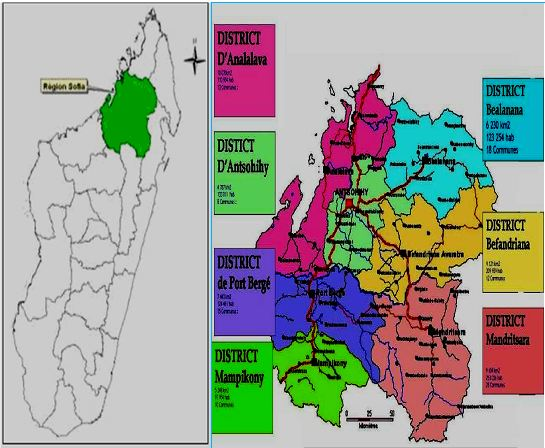
The districts of Sofia

Boriziny-Vaovao is a district of Sofia in Madagascar. The capital of Boriziny-Vaovao is the city of Boriziny, formerly called Port-Bergé. The Sofia River flows into the sea in this district. The district has an area of 7,088 km^{2} (2,737 sq mi), and the estimated population in 2020 was 248,906.

== Communes ==
The district is further divided into 15 communes:

- Ambanjabe
- Ambodimahabibo
- Ambodisakoana
- Ambodivongo
- Amparihy
- Andranomeva
- Boriziny (Port-Bergé)
- Boriziny II
- Leanja
- Maevaranohely
- Marovato
- Tsarahasina
- Tsaratanana
- Tsiningia
- Tsinjomitondraka

== Roads ==
The RN 6 is the mayor paved road in the district.

== Protected areas ==
- Part of the Bongolava Forest Corridor, a protected harmonious landscape
- Part of Tampoketsa Analamaitso special reserve
