= Soganaclia tsaratananae =

Scientific classification
- Kingdom: Animalia
- Phylum: Arthropoda
- Class: Insecta
- Order: Lepidoptera
- Superfamily: Noctuoidea
- Family: Erebidae
- Subfamily: Arctiinae
- Genus: Soganaclia
- Species: S. tsaratananae

Binomial name
- Soganaclia tsaratananae Griveaud, 1970

Species of moth

Soganaclia tsaratananae is a moth of the subfamily Arctiinae first described by Paul Griveaud in 1970. It is found in northern Madagascar where it seems to be confined to the high altitudes of the Tsaratanana Massif.

The wingspan of the male adults is about 20 mm. This species looks similar to Soganaclia roedereri but is a little bigger in size.
