= Tsiningia =

- Location in Madagascar
- Coordinates: 15°29′S 47°27′E
- Country: Madagascar
- Region: Sofia
- District: Boriziny
- Elevation: 29 m (95 ft)

Population (2001)
  - Total: 16,000
- Time zone: UTC3 (aeT)

Tsiningia is a town and commune (Malagasy: kaominina) in Madagascar. It belongs to the district of Boriziny, which is a part of Sofia Region. The population of the commune was estimated to be approximately 16,000 in 2001 commune census.

Primary and junior level secondary education are available in town. The majority 66% of the population of the commune are farmers, while an additional 27% receives their livelihood from raising livestock. The most important crop is rice, while other important products are maize and cassava. Additionally fishing employs 7% of the population.

The town lies at the Sofia River.
