= Ecoregions of Madagascar =

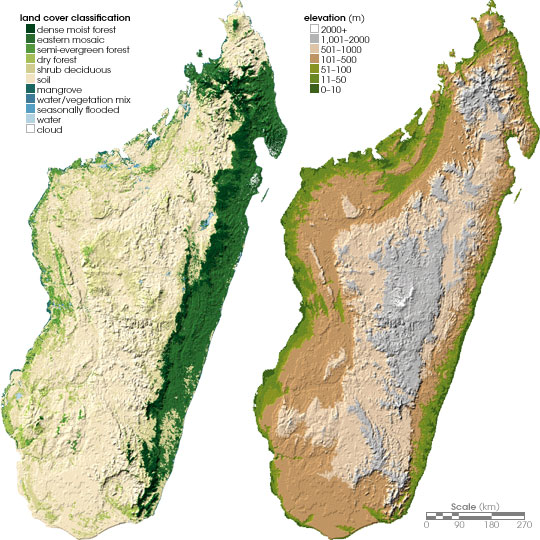
Land cover (left) and topography (right) of Madagascar.

The ecoregions of Madagascar, as defined by the World Wildlife Fund, include seven terrestrial, five freshwater, and two marine ecoregions. Madagascar's diverse natural habitats harbour a rich fauna and flora with high levels of endemism, but most ecoregions suffer from habitat loss.

== Overview ==
Madagascar belongs to the Afrotropical realm. With its neighboring Indian Ocean islands, it has been classified by botanist Armen Takhtajan as Madagascan Region, and in phytogeography it is the floristic phytochorion Madagascan Subkingdom in the Paleotropical Kingdom. Madagascar features very contrasting topography, climate, and geology. A mountain range on the east, rising to 2,876 m (9,436 ft) at its highest point, captures most rainfall brought in by trade winds from the Indian Ocean. Consequently, the eastern belt harbours most of the humid forests, while precipitation decreases to the west. The rain shadow region in the southwest has a sub-arid climate. Temperatures are highest on the west coast, with annual means of up to 30 °C (86 °F), while the high massifs have a cool climate, with a 5 °C (41 °F) annual mean locally. Geology features mainly igneous and metamorphic basement rocks, with some lava and quartzite in the central and eastern plateaus, while the western part has belts of sandstone, limestone (including the tsingy formations), and unconsolidated sand.

== Terrestrial ecoregions ==
Seven terrestrial ecoregions are defined by the World Wildlife Fund for Madagascar. They range from the very humid eastern lowland forests to the sub-arid spiny thickets in the southwest.

Ecoregion	Biome	WWF code	Map	Image
Madagascar lowland forests or Madagascar humid forests	Tropical moist broadleaf forest: specifically seasonal (monsoon) tropical forest	AT0117		
Madagascar subhumid forests	Tropical moist broadleaf forest	AT0118		
Madagascar dry deciduous forests	Tropical dry forest	AT0202		
Madagascar ericoid thickets	Montane shrubland	AT1011		
Madagascar spiny thickets or Madagascar spiny forests	Xeric shrubland	AT1311		
Madagascar succulent woodlands	Xeric shrubland	AT1312		
Madagascar mangroves	Mangroves	AT1404		

== Freshwater ecoregions ==
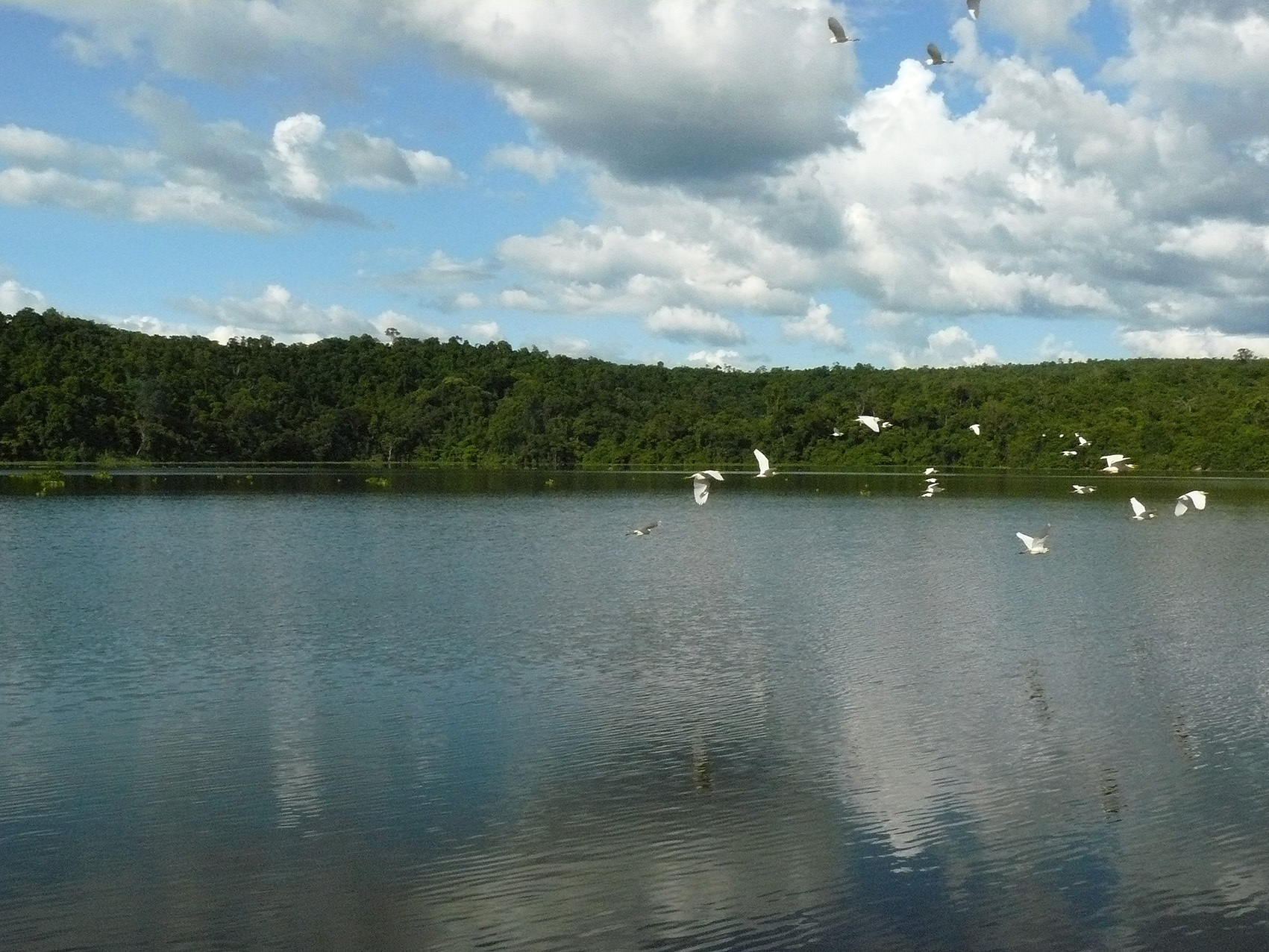
Lake Ravelobe in Ankarafantsika National Park.

Freshwater ecoregions correspond to major catchment areas with a distinctive assemblage of species. In Madagascar, five ecoregions are distinguished:

- Madagascar Eastern Lowlands includes the lower humid-climate coastal plain of eastern Madagascar.
- Madagascar Eastern Highlands includes the middle and upper catchments of Madagascar's eastern coastal rivers.
- Northwestern Madagascar encompasses the westward-flowing drainage basins from the northern tip of Madagascar to the Mahavavy du Sud River, including the Mananjeba, North Mahavavy (Mahavavy du Nord), Sambirano, Ankofia, Sofia, Anjobony, Mahajamba, Betsiboka, and South Mahavavy (Mahavavy du Sud).
- Western Madagascar encompasses the drier western river basins, including the Manambolo, Tsiribihina, Mangoky, and Onilahy rivers.
- Southern Madagascar encompasses the southern drainages of Madagascar, including the Mandrare, Manambovo, Menarandra, and Linta rivers, along with Lake Tsimanampetsotsa.

== Marine ecoregions ==
The seas around Madagascar are part of the Western Indian Ocean province in the Western Indo-Pacific realm. They are divided into two marine ecoregions:

- Southeast Madagascar
- Western and Northern Madagascar
