= Soganaclia =

Scientific classification
- Domain: Eukaryota
- Kingdom: Animalia
- Phylum: Arthropoda
- Class: Insecta
- Order: Lepidoptera
- Superfamily: Noctuoidea
- Family: Erebidae
- Subfamily: Arctiinae
- Genus: Soganaclia; Griveaud, 1964

Genus of moths

Soganaclia is a genus of moths in the subfamily Arctiinae. The genus was erected by Paul Griveaud in 1964.

The species of this genus are found in northern Madagascar where they seem to be confined to the high altitudes of the Tsaratanana Massif.

== Species ==
- Soganaclia roedereri Griveaud, 1970
- Soganaclia tsaratananae Griveaud, 1970
- Soganaclia viridisparsa Griveaud, 1964
