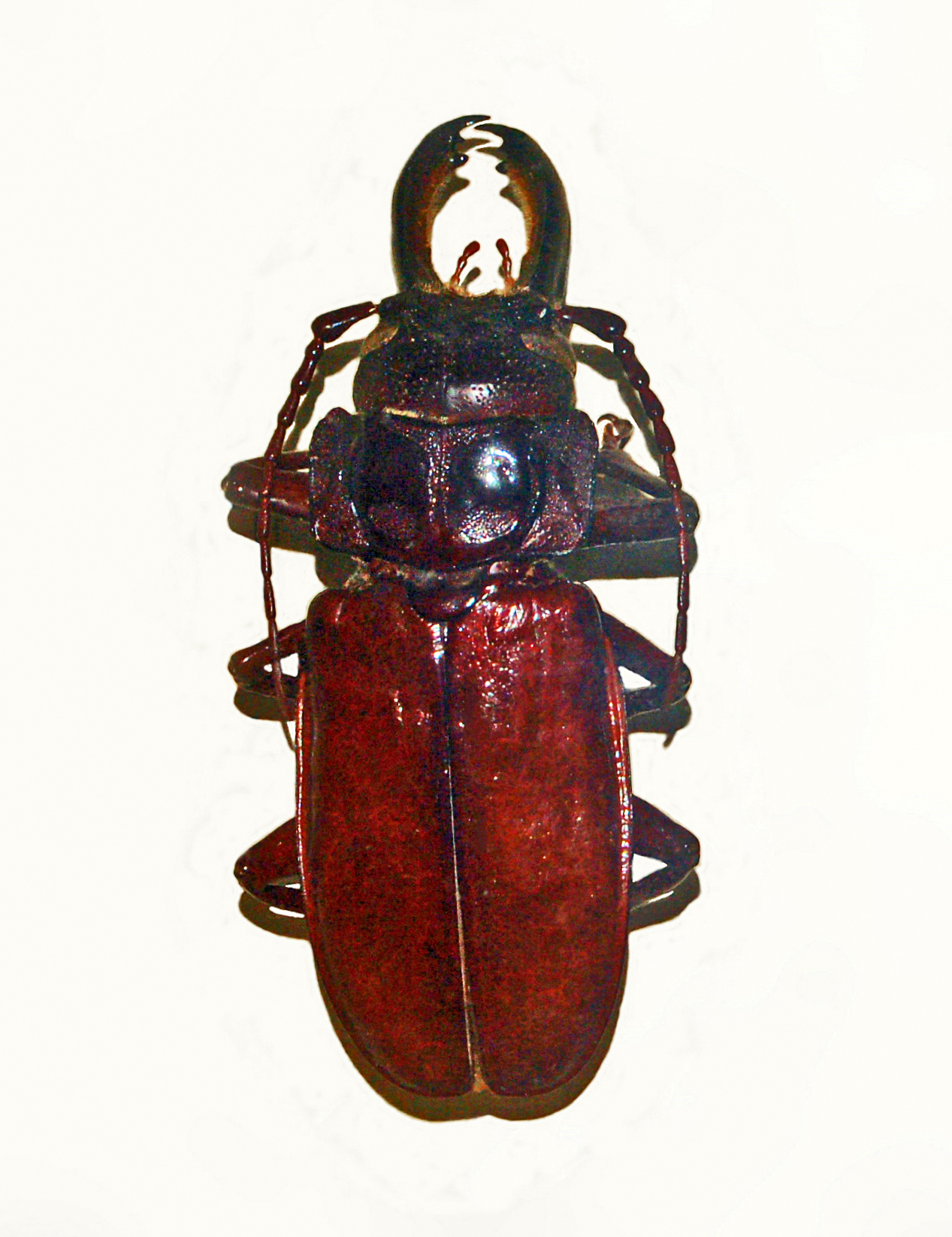
- From São Tomé and Príncipe

Scientific classification
- Kingdom: Animalia
- Phylum: Arthropoda
- Clade: Pancrustacea
- Class: Insecta
- Order: Coleoptera
- Suborder: Polyphaga
- Infraorder: Cucujiformia
- Family: Cerambycidae
- Genus: Mallodon
- Species: M. downesi

Binomial name
- Mallodon downesi Hope, 1843

Synonyms
- Mallodon costipenne White, 1853; Mallodon laevipenne White, 1853; Mallodon plagiatum Thomson, 1867; Mallodon proximum Thomson, 1867; Stenodontes (Mallodon) dasystomus plagiatus (Thomson) Lameere, 1902; Stenodontes (Mallodon) downesi (Hope) Lameere, 1902; Stenodontes (Orthomallodon) downesi (Hope) Santos Ferreira, 1980; Mallodon spinibarbis (Linnaeus) Bertoloni, 1849

= Mallodon downesi =

Species of beetle

Mallodon downesi is a species of beetle belonging to the family Cerambycidae.

== Description ==
Mallondon downesi can reach a length of about 33–65 millimetres (1.3–2.6 in). The colours range from dark brown to black. Females are larger than males, but males have longer curved mandibles. Antennae are quite short in comparison with other species in the family. These beetles lay their eggs in rotten wood. Larvae are about 85 millimetres (3.3 in) long.

Main host plants are Acacia polyacantha, Cananga odorata, Canarium schweinfurthii, Cocos nucifera, Daniellia oliveri, Delonix regia, Hevea brasiliensis, Khaya anthotheca, Persea americana, Spondias mombin, Spondias purpurea, Sterculia tragacantha, Tamarindus indica and Theobroma cacao.

== Distribution ==
This species is widespread throughout the Afrotropical and Madagascan regions (Angola, Benin, Botswana, Burundi, Cameroon, Central African Republic, Comoros, Democratic Republic of the Congo, Ethiopia, Gabon, Gambia, Ghana, Guinea, Guinea-Bissau, Ivory Coast, Kenya, Liberia, Madagascar, Mali, Mozambique, Namibia, Nigeria, Republic of the Congo, Rwanda, São Tomé and Príncipe, Senegal, Sierra Leone, South Africa, Tanzania, Togo, Uganda, Zambia and Zimbabwe).
