= Tsarahasina =

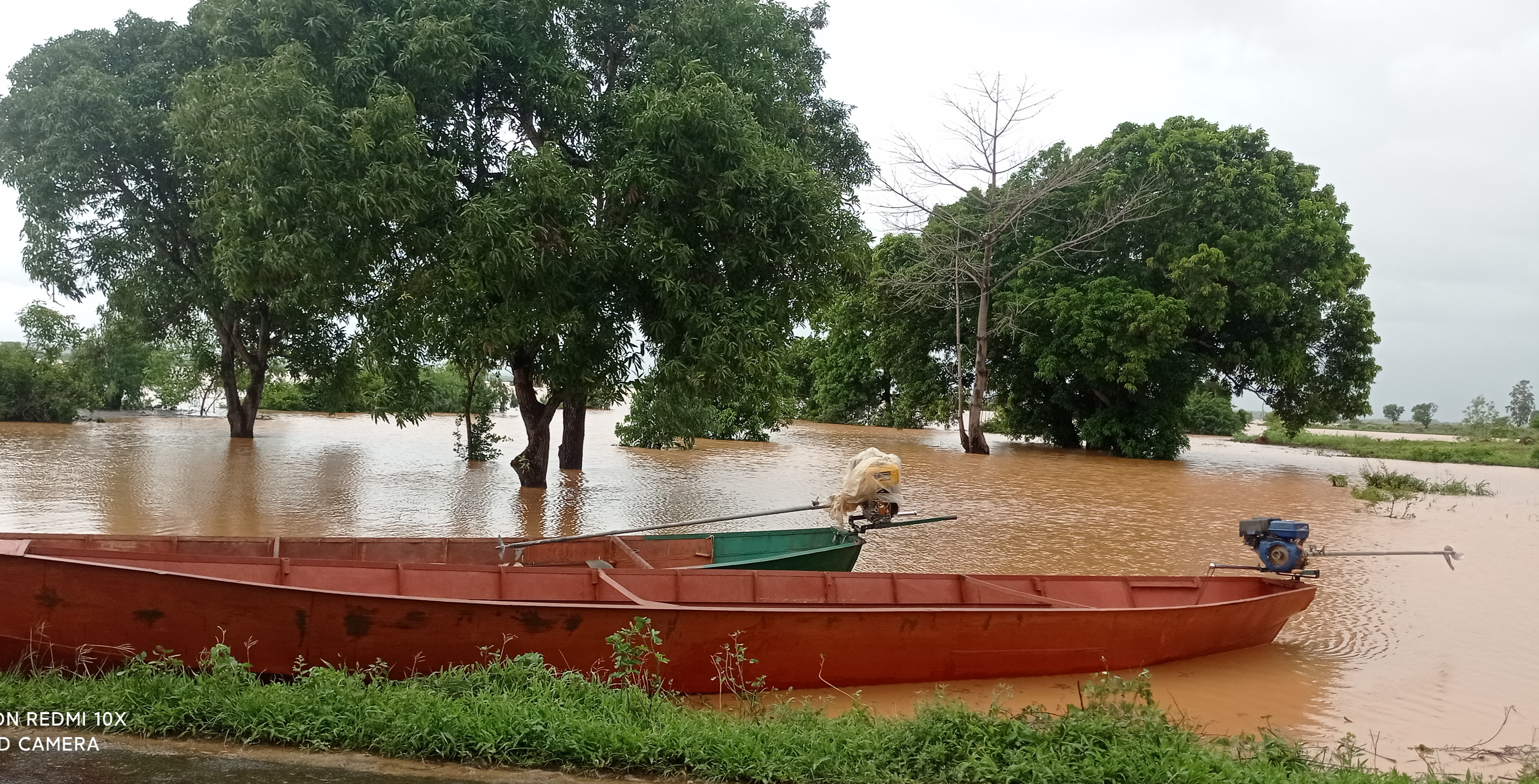

- Location in Madagascar
- Coordinates: 15°46′S 47°35′E
- Country: Madagascar
- Region: Sofia
- District: Boriziny
- Elevation: 31 m (102 ft)

Population (2001)
  - Total: 14,000
- Time zone: UTC3 (EAT)
- Postal code: 419

Tsarahasina is a municipality in Madagascar. It belongs to the district of Boriziny-Vaovao, which is a part of Sofia Region. The population of the commune was estimated to be approximately 14,000 in 2001 commune census.

== Geography ==
Tsarahasina is situated on at National Road 6, shortly before Port-Bergé. It is situated along the Bemarivo River.

Only primary schooling is available. The majority 60% of the population of the commune are farmers, while an additional 39% receives their livelihood from raising livestock. The most important crops are rice and cotton, while other important agricultural products are tobacco and cowpea. Services provide employment for 1% of the population.
