= Bemarivo (Sofia) =

River in Madagascar

Bemarivo river (Sofia)
- Bemarivo river

- Map of Malagasy rivers (Bemarivo flows from the central-northern part to the eastern coast).

Location
- Country: Madagascar
- Region: Sofia

Physical characteristics
- Source
  - location: Antolana
  - elevation: 1199
- Mouth
  - location: Anjobony
  - coordinates: 15°30′00″S 47°40′08″E
- Length: 265 km (165 mi)
- Basin size: 15270 km2

Basin features
- Progression: Ambinanyndrano, Antanetilava, Mahatsinjo Ambatohararana, Mampikony, Boriziny

the bassin of Bemarivo & Sofia rivers

The Bemarivo river in Sofia Region (/be.mari.v/), is located in northern Madagascar. It drains to the northern coast, into the Anjobony shortly before the Sofia River, near Boriziny (Port Bergé).

It is flows along the RN 6 and RN 4.
