= Quansah =

Quansah is a surname. Notable people with the surname include:

- Abeiku Quansah (born 1990), Ghanaian footballer
- Charles Quansah (born 1964), Ghanaian serial killer
- Jarell Quansah (born 2003), English footballer
- Kwame Quansah (born 1982), Ghanaian footballer
- Nat Quansah (born 1953), Ghanaian botanist and academic
- Celia Quansah (born 1995), English rugby union player
