= Soganaclia viridisparsa =

Scientific classification
- Kingdom: Animalia
- Phylum: Arthropoda
- Class: Insecta
- Order: Lepidoptera
- Superfamily: Noctuoidea
- Family: Erebidae
- Subfamily: Arctiinae
- Genus: Soganaclia
- Species: S. viridisparsa

Binomial name
- Soganaclia viridisparsa Griveaud, 1964

Species of moth

Soganaclia viridisparsa is a moth of the subfamily Arctiinae first described by Paul Griveaud in 1964. It is found in northern Madagascar where it seems to be confined to the high altitudes of the Tsaratanana Massif.
