= Amparihy =

- Location in Madagascar
- Coordinates: 15°40′S 47°7′E
- Country: Madagascar
- Region: Sofia
- District: Boriziny
- Elevation: 16 m (52 ft)

Population (2001)
  - Total: 10,000
- Time zone: UTC3 (EAT)

Amparihy is a town and commune (Malagasy: kaominina) in Madagascar. It belongs to the district of Boriziny, which is a part of Sofia Region. The population of the commune was estimated to be approximately 10,000 in 2001 commune census.

Only primary schooling is available. The majority 60% of the population of the commune are farmers, while an additional 38% receives their livelihood from raising livestock. The most important crops are rice and cotton, while other important agricultural products are beans and tobacco. Services provide employment for 2% of the population.
