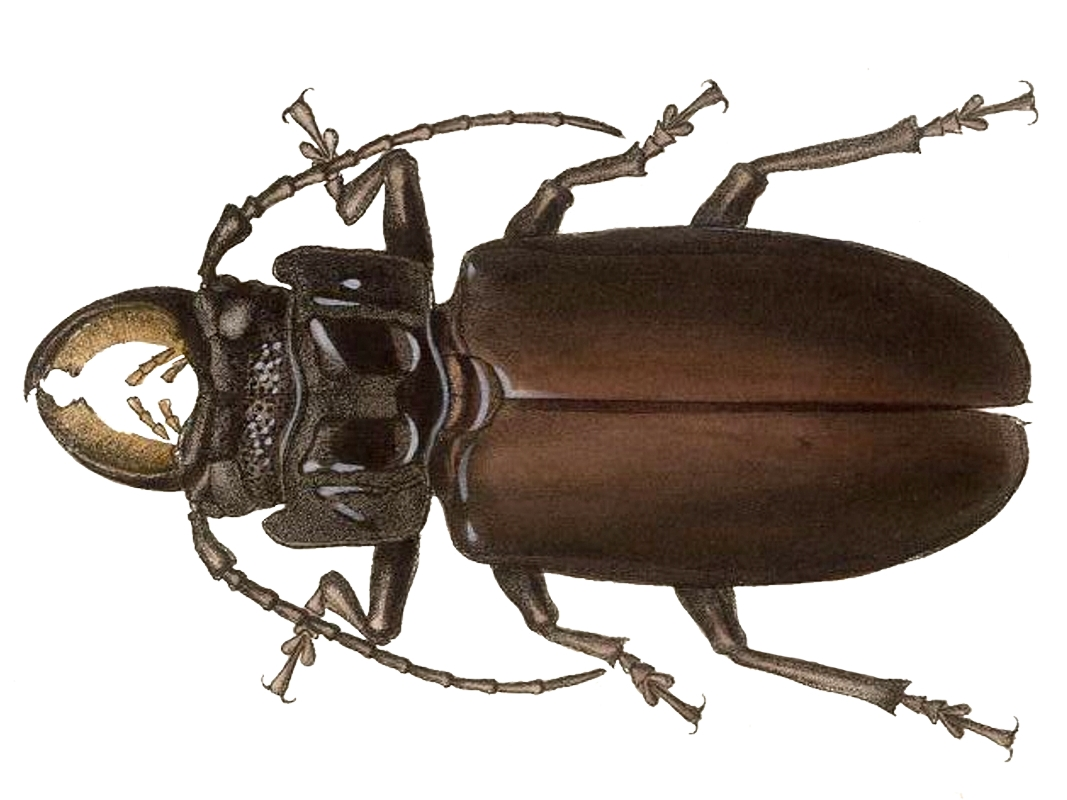

Scientific classification
- Kingdom: Animalia
- Phylum: Arthropoda
- Clade: Pancrustacea
- Class: Insecta
- Order: Coleoptera
- Suborder: Polyphaga
- Infraorder: Cucujiformia
- Family: Cerambycidae
- Genus: Mallodon
- Species: M. chevrolatii

Binomial name
- Mallodon chevrolatii (Thomson, 1867)

= Mallodon chevrolatii =

Species of beetle

Mallodon chevrolatii is a species of long-horned beetle in the family Cerambycidae. It is found in Colombia.
