= Port Bergé Airport =

Airport in Madagascar

- IATA: WPB; ICAO: FMNG

Summary
- Airport type: Public
- Serves: Port Bergé, Sofia Region, Madagascar
- Elevation AMSL: 213 ft / 65 m
- Coordinates: 15°35′03.4″S 047°37′24.9″E

Map
- Location of Airport in Madagascar

Runways
Direction	Length		Surface
Direction	m	ft	Surface
(09/27)	1,300	4,265	dirt

Port Bergé Airport (IATA: WPB, ICAO: FMNG) is an airport serving Port Bergé, a city in the Sofia Region of Madagascar.
