= Andranomeva =

- Location in Madagascar
- Coordinates: 15°48′S 47°46′E
- Country: Madagascar
- Region: Sofia
- District: Boriziny
- Elevation: 51 m (167 ft)

Population (2001)
  - Total: 11,000
- Time zone: UTC3 (EAT)

Andranomeva is a town and commune (Malagasy: kaominina) in Madagascar. It belongs to the district of Boriziny, which is a part of Sofia Region. The population of the commune was estimated at 11,000 in the 2001 commune census.

Primary and junior level secondary education are available in town. About 90% of the population of the commune are farmers. The most important crop is rice, while other important products are maize and cassava. Fishing employs 10% of the population.
