= Madagascar mangroves =

Coastal ecoregion in the mangrove forest biome found on the west coast of Madagascar

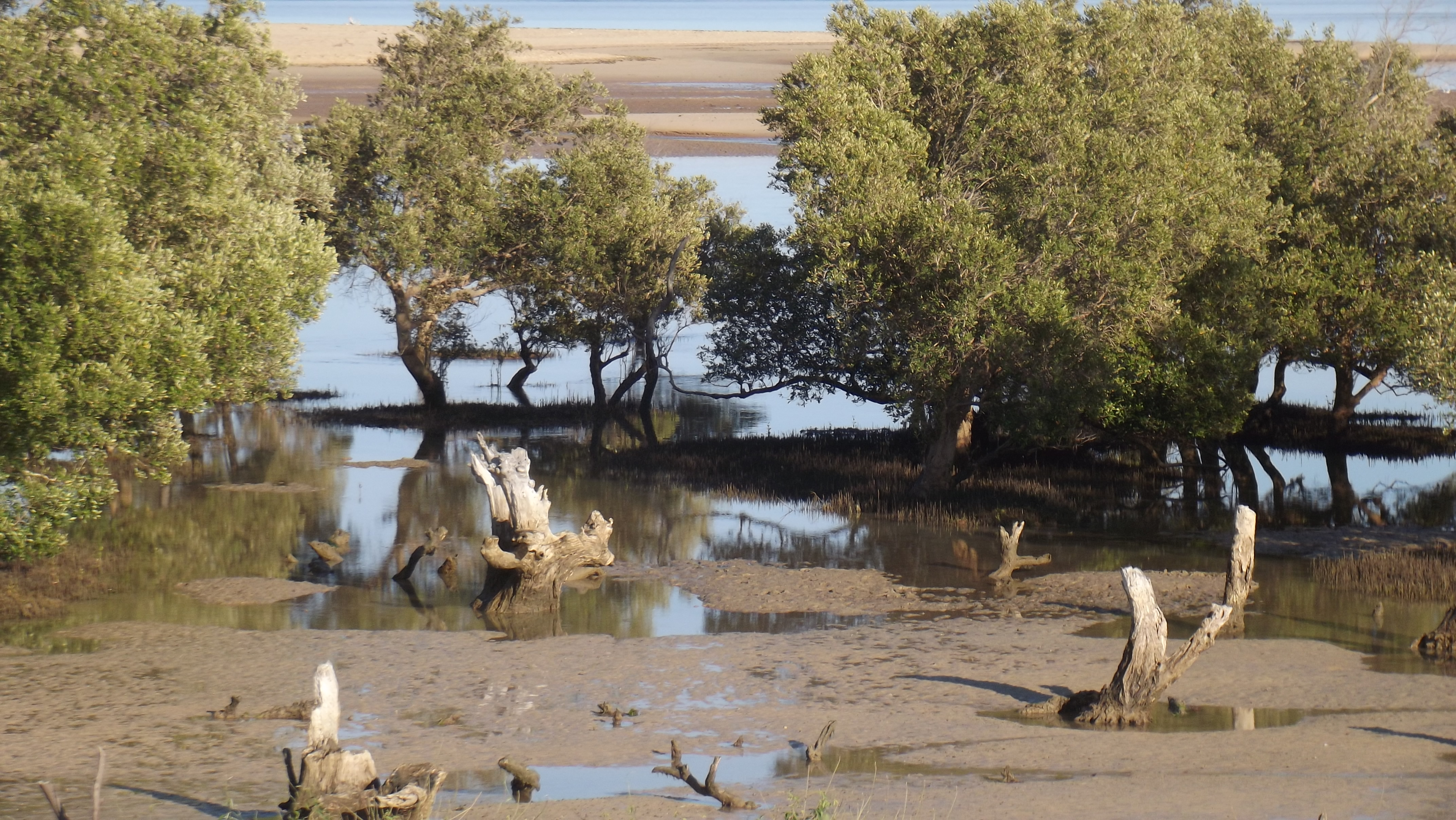
- Mangroves, between Ifaty and Belalanda

Ecology
- Realm: Afrotropical
- Biome: Mangroves
- Borders: Madagascar dry deciduous forests, Madagascar subhumid forests, Madagascar succulent woodlands, Madagascar spiny forests
- Animals: green turtle, hawksbill turtle, dugong
- Bird species: Madagascar heron, Madagascar fish eagle

Geography
- Area: 5,200 km^{2} (2,000 mi^{2})
- Country: Madagascar
- Elevation: sea level
- Coordinates: 17°1′S 44°12′E
- Geology: river sediments
- Climate type: Tropical monsoon climate (Am), hot semi-arid climate (BSh), and hot desert climate (BWh)

Conservation
- Conservation status: vulnerable
- Global 200: included

Madagascar mangroves are a coastal ecoregion in the mangrove forest biome found on the west coast of Madagascar. They are included in the WWF's Global 200 list of most outstanding ecoregions.

== Geography ==
Mangrove swamps are located in flat coastal areas where the ocean tides wash saltwater high into the mouths of rivers which are bringing nutrient-rich soil down to the coast. For mangroves to thrive, there needs to be some natural feature such as coral reefs to shelter the coast from ocean storms and monsoons. In Madagascar, they are mostly found on the more sheltered west coast along the Mozambique Channel, where they stretch along roughly 1,000 kilometres (620 mi) of coastline. The largest areas are in the estuaries of the Betsiboka River (in Bombetoka Bay near the city of Mahajanga), Besalampy, the Mahajamba and South Mahavavy river, and near Maintirano. The climate is warm all along the coast but more humid in the north.

== Flora ==
The mangrove trees found in Madagascar are mainly Rhizophora mucronata, black mangrove (Bruguiera gymnorhiza), Ceriops tagal, white mangrove (Avicennia marina), Sonneratia alba and Lumnitzera racemosa. Other species are Xylocarpus granatum and Heritiera littoralis.

== Fauna ==
Mangrove swamps, in Madagascar and around the world, are an important habitat for wildlife. They are a vital breeding ground for many species of fish and a feeding place for migratory birds. The waters of the Madagascar mangroves are rich in fish and other animals such as waterbirds, crocodiles, green turtle (Chelonia mydas), hawksbill turtle (Eretmochelys imbricata), and dugongs. Birds include the African spoonbill, great egret, sakalava rail and grey heron. Much of this wildlife is endemic to Madagascar. The many fish found in the waters include the families Mugilidae, Serranidae, Carangidae, Gerridae, Hemiramphidae, Plectorhinchinae, and Elopidae. Neighbouring coral reefs are also extremely diverse.

== Threats and conservation ==
Mangroves are vulnerable to clearance for timber, urban expansion, over-fishing, and erosion in the highlands. Activities such as rice growing, salt-panning and shrimp cultivation are also threats. Urban areas near the mangroves include the cities Toliara and Mahajanga. Mananara Nord National Park protects some mangrove swamps.

Honey is produced in mangroves as a source of (non-destructive) income generation which can help in preventing people from destroying the mangroves (i.e. for charcoal production). In addition, silk pods from endemic silkworm species are also collected in the Madagascar mangroves for wild silk production.

== See also ==
- Ecoregions of Madagascar
