= Nat Quansah =

Ghanaian botanist

- Born: 21 September 1953 (age 72); Ghana
- Education: University of London, Goldsmiths College University of Cape Coast, Ghana
- Occupation: Botanist
- Notable work: Founded a healthcare clinic in Ambodisakoana, Madagascar.
- Awards: Goldman Environmental Prize (2000)

Nat Quansah (Born on 21, September 1953) is a botanist from Ghana.

He founded a healthcare clinic in Ambodisakoana, Madagascar. He was awarded the Goldman Environmental Prize in 2000, for his works on health care, cultural tradition, and forest conservation.

== Biography ==
Quansah earned a doctorate in philosophy in pteridology from the University of London, Goldsmiths College. He received a master's degree in botany at the University of Cape Coast, Ghana. He has taught courses on ethnobotany at the University of Antananarivo. Since 2008 he has served as the academic director for the Madagascar: Traditional Medicine and Healthcare Systems summer program. From 2013 to 2014, he served as academic director for the School for International Training (SIT) program Tanzania: Zanzibar — Coastal Ecology and Natural Resource Management.

He was awarded the Goldman Environmental Prize in 2000, for his works on health care, cultural tradition, and forest conservation, based in Ambodisakoana, Madagascar. He founded a healthcare clinic in Ambodisakoana, Madagascar in 1994 that developed and implemented the Integrated Health Care and Conservation Program. The program integrates the diverse health, economic, biological, and cultural backgrounds of local people to simultaneously address healthcare and conservation needs. The work of the clinic has been done in partnership with the World Wide Fund for Nature and treated thousands of patients-many with native and threatened medicinal plants. Nat Quansah reintroduced the use of native plants as medicine to thousands of Malagasy people in an Ambodisakoana clinic he opened, educating the community about the need for forest conservation in Madagascar.

== Awards ==
2000 Goldman Prize winner
