= Mallodon spinibarbis =

Scientific classification
- Kingdom: Animalia
- Phylum: Arthropoda
- Clade: Pancrustacea
- Class: Insecta
- Order: Coleoptera
- Suborder: Polyphaga
- Infraorder: Cucujiformia
- Family: Cerambycidae
- Genus: Mallodon
- Species: M. spinibarbis

Binomial name
- Mallodon spinibarbis (Linnaeus, 1758)

Synonyms
- Cerambyx (Prionus) spinibarbis Linné, 1758; Prionus dentatus Fabricius, 1802; Mallodon bonariensis Thomson, 1867; Prionus gagatinus Germar, 1823; Mallodon germarii Thomson, 1867; Prionus maxillosus Olivier, 1795; Mallodon orbignyi Thomson, 1867

Species of beetle

Mallodon spinibarbis is a species of beetle of the family Cerambycidae. It is found in Mexico, Honduras, Nicaragua (Chontales, León), El Salvador, Costa Rica (San José), Venezuela, (Aragua, Carabobo, Bolivar, Distrito Federal, Miranda, Yaracuy, Guarico, Cojedes, Monagas, Apure, Zulia), Colombia (Atlántico), Guyana, French Guiana, Ecuador, Brazil (Roraima, Amazonas, Pará, Tocantins, Distrito Federal, Mato Grosso, Mato Grosso do Sul, Goiás, Maranhão, Alagoas, Piauí, Rio Grande do Norte, Paraíba, Ceará, Fernando de Noronha, Bahia, Minas Gerais, Espírito Santo, Rio de Janeiro, São Paulo, Paraná, Santa Catarina, Rio Grande do Sul), Peru, Bolivia (Tarija), Paraguay, Argentina (Misiones, Santiago del Estero, Santa Fé, Córdoba, San Juan, Mendoza, San Luís, Buenos Aires), Uruguay, Aruba, Curaçao, Dominica and St. Vincent.
