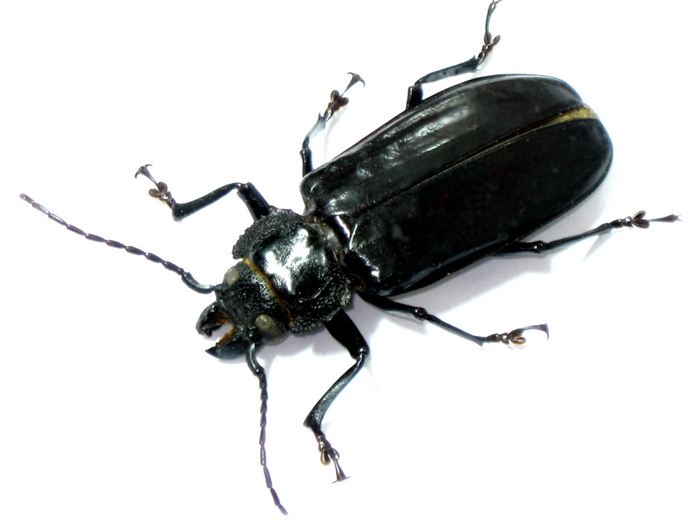

Scientific classification
- Kingdom: Animalia
- Phylum: Arthropoda
- Clade: Pancrustacea
- Class: Insecta
- Order: Coleoptera
- Suborder: Polyphaga
- Infraorder: Cucujiformia
- Family: Cerambycidae
- Genus: Mallodon
- Species: M. dasystomus

Binomial name
- Mallodon dasystomus (Say, 1824)

= Mallodon dasystomus =

Species of beetle

Mallodon dasystomus, the hardwood stump borer, is a species of long-horned beetle in the family Cerambycidae. Specimens range in length from 35 to 50 millimetres (1.38 to 1.97 in).

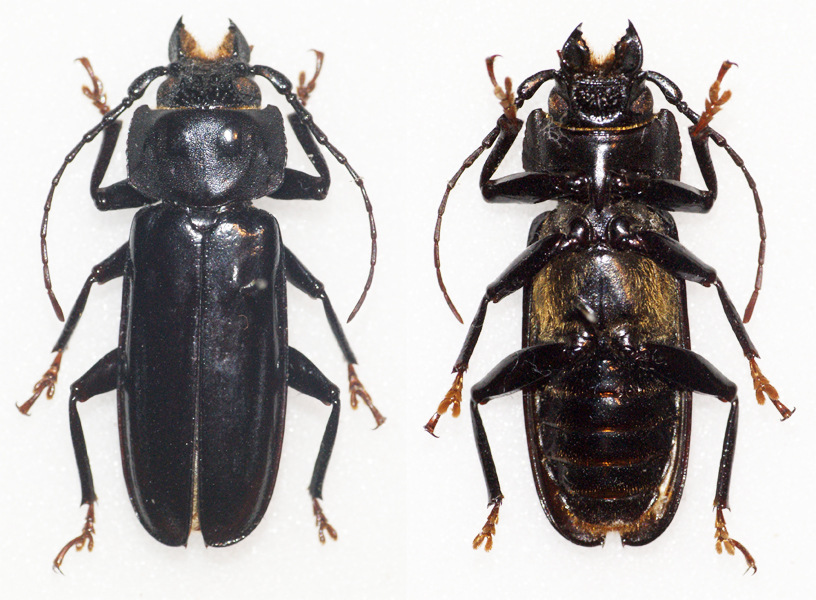
Hardwood stump borer, Mallodon dasystomus
