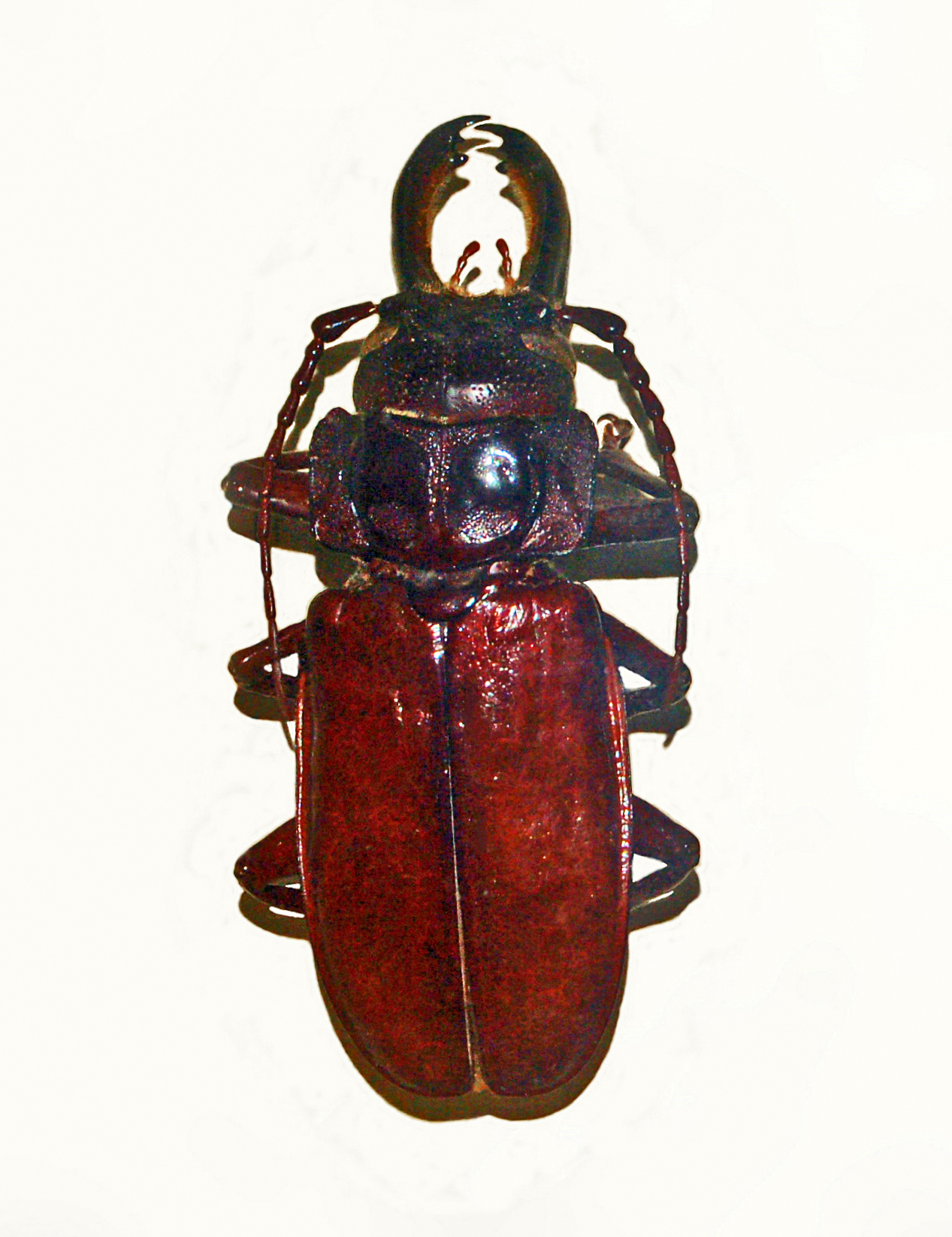
- Mallodon downesi

Scientific classification
- Kingdom: Animalia
- Phylum: Arthropoda
- Clade: Pancrustacea
- Class: Insecta
- Order: Coleoptera
- Suborder: Polyphaga
- Infraorder: Cucujiformia
- Family: Cerambycidae
- Subfamily: Prioninae
- Tribe: Mallodontini
- Genus: Mallodon; Audinet-Serville et Lacordaire, 1830

Synonyms
- Stenodontes (Orthomallodon) Linsley, 1957; Orthomallodon Linsley 1957; Opheltes Thomson 1864

= Mallodon =

Genus of beetles

Mallodon is a genus of beetles belonging to the family Cerambycidae.

== List of species ==
- Mallodon arabicus Buquet, 1843
- Mallodon baiulus Erichson, 1847
- Mallodon chevrolatii Thomson, 1867
- Mallodon dasystomus (Say, 1824)
- Mallodon downesi Hope, 1843
- Mallodon linsleyi Fragoso et Monné, 1995
- Mallodon spinibarbis (Linnaeus, 1758)
- Mallodon vermiculatus Hovore et Santos-Silva, 2004
