= Marovato, Boriziny =

Marovato
- Location in Madagascar
- Coordinates: 15°54′S 48°3′E
- Country: Madagascar
- Region: Sofia
- District: Boriziny
- Elevation: 268 m (879 ft)

Population (2001)
  - Total: 23,000
- Time zone: UTC3 (EAT)

Marovato is a town and commune (Malagasy: kaominina) in Madagascar. It belongs to the district of Boriziny, which is a part of Sofia Region. The population of the commune was estimated to be approximately 23,000 in 2001 commune census.

Primary and junior level secondary education are available in town. The majority 70% of the population of the commune are farmers, while an additional 25% receives their livelihood from raising livestock. The most important crop is rice, while other important products are peanuts, maize and cassava. Services provide employment for 5% of the population.

== Rivers ==
Marovato lies at the Anjobony river.
