= Soganaclia roedereri =

Scientific classification
- Kingdom: Animalia
- Phylum: Arthropoda
- Class: Insecta
- Order: Lepidoptera
- Superfamily: Noctuoidea
- Family: Erebidae
- Subfamily: Arctiinae
- Genus: Soganaclia
- Species: S. roedereri

Binomial name
- Soganaclia roedereri Griveaud, 1970

Species of moth

Soganaclia roedereri is a moth of the subfamily Arctiinae first described by Paul Griveaud in 1970. It is found in northern Madagascar where it seems to be confined to the high altitudes of the Tsaratanana Massif.

The wingspan is about 15–16 mm, with a length of the forewings of 7–8 mm.
