= Ambodivongo =

- Location in Madagascar
- Coordinates: 15°39′S 48°13′E
- Country: Madagascar
- Region: Sofia
- District: Boriziny
- Elevation: 250 m (820 ft)

Population (2001)
  - Total: 8,000
- Time zone: UTC3 (EAT)

Ambodivongo is a town and commune (Malagasy: kaominina) in Madagascar. It belongs to the district of Boriziny, which is a part of Sofia Region. The population of the commune was estimated to be approximately 8,000 in 2001 commune census.

Only primary schooling is available. The majority 50% of the population of the commune are farmers. The most important crop is rice, while other important products are maize and cassava. Additionally fishing employs 50% of the population.
