= Boriziny =

Boriziny Port Bergé
- Location in Madagascar
- Coordinates: 15.567°S 47.621°E
- Country: Madagascar
- Region: Sofia
- District: Boriziny-Vaovao (district)

Area
  - Total: 22.9 km^{2} (8.8 sq mi)
- Elevation: 41 m (135 ft)

Population (2018)
  - Total: 22,573
  - Density: 986/km^{2} (2,550/sq mi)
- Time zone: UTC3 (EAT)
- Postal code: 419

Boriziny (French: Port-Bergé) is a city (commune urbaine) in western Madagascar in Sofia Region. The population of the commune urbaine was 22,573 in 2018.

== Geography ==
It is situated at the Route nationale 6 near the bay of Mahajamba. The Bemarivo flows near Port Bergé, just before flowing into the Anjobony and the Sofia River.

An airport serves the town.

== Religion ==
It is the seat of the Roman Catholic Diocese of Boriziny (Cathedral of Our Lady of Assumption).

== Agriculture ==
Port Bergé (Boriziny) is one of the few districts where tobacco is grown in Madagascar.

== Sports ==
- TAM Port Bergé (football) - Sofia football champions in 2021, 2019, 2018, 2016 and 2015.

== Protected areas ==
- The Bongolava Forest Corridor that covers 60.701 ha in the area between Port Bergé and Mampikony.
