= Anjobony =

River in Madagascar

Anjobony river
- Anjobony river

- Map of Malagasy rivers (Anjobony flows from the central-northern part).

- Location of mouth

Location
- Country: Madagascar
- Region: Sofia

Physical characteristics
- Source
  - location: Amparirimbaratra
  - elevation: 1201
- Mouth
  - location: Sofia River
  - coordinates: 15°27′25″S 47°39′08″E
- Length: 200 km (120 mi)
- Basin size: 4230 km2

Basin features
- Progression: Boriziny, Marovato,
- Tributaries
  - left: Bemarivo (Sofia)

bassin of the Sofia river

The Anjobony river in Sofia Region is located in northern Madagascar. It drains to the northern coast. Its main affluent is the Bemarivo (Sofia). near Boriziny (Port Bergé).

It flows into the Sofia River.
