= Ambanjabe =

- Location in Madagascar
- Coordinates: 15°38′S 47°42′E
- Country: Madagascar
- Region: Sofia
- District: Boriziny
- Elevation: 43 m (141 ft)

Population (2001)
  - Total: 8,000
- Time zone: UTC3 (EAT)

Ambanjabe is a town and commune (Malagasy: kaominina) in Madagascar. It belongs to the district of Boriziny, which is a part of Sofia Region. The population of the commune was estimated to be approximately 8,000 in 2001 commune census.

Only primary schooling is available. The majority 60% of the population of the commune are farmers, while an additional 30% receives their livelihood from raising livestock. The most important crop is other peas, while other important products are cotton and rice. Services provide employment for 10% of the population.
