= Leanja =

- Location in Madagascar
- Coordinates: 15°33′S 47°56′E
- Country: Madagascar
- Region: Sofia
- District: Boriziny
- Elevation: 74 m (243 ft)

Population (2001)
  - Total: 16,000
- Time zone: UTC3 (EAT)

Leanja is a town and commune (Malagasy: kaominina) in Madagascar. It belongs to the district of Boriziny, which is a part of Sofia Region. The population of the commune was estimated to be approximately 16,000 in 2001 commune census.

Primary and junior level secondary education are available in town. The majority 99% of the population of the commune are farmers. The most important crop is rice, while other important products are cotton, maize, cassava and tobacco. Additionally fishing employs 1% of the population.
