= Maevaranohely =

- Location in Madagascar
- Coordinates: 15°51′S 47°18′E
- Country: Madagascar
- Region: Sofia
- District: Boriziny
- Elevation: 85 m (279 ft)

Population (2001)
  - Total: 4,000
- Time zone: UTC3 (EAT)

Maevaranohely is a town and commune (Malagasy: kaominina) in Madagascar. It belongs to the district of Boriziny, which is a part of Sofia Region. The population of the commune was estimated to be approximately 4,000 in 2001 commune census.

Only primary schooling is available. The majority 90% of the population of the commune are farmers, while an additional 9.5% receives their livelihood from raising livestock. The most important crop is rice, while other important products are other produced of revenue, maize and cassava. Additionally fishing employs 0.5% of the population.
