= Tsinjomitondraka =

- Location in Madagascar
- Coordinates: 15°40′S 47°8′E
- Country: Madagascar
- Region: Sofia
- District: Boriziny
- Elevation: 29 m (95 ft)

Population (2001)
  - Total: 11,000
- Time zone: UTC3 (EAT)

Tsinjomitondraka is a town and commune (Malagasy: kaominina) in Madagascar. It belongs to the district of Boriziny, which is a part of Sofia Region. The population of the commune was estimated to be approximately 11,000 in 2001 commune census.

Tsinjomitondraka has a riverine harbour. Only primary schooling is available. The majority 60% of the population of the commune are farmers, while an additional 10% receives their livelihood from raising livestock. The most important crop is oranges, while other important products are coconuts, cassava and rice. Additionally fishing employs 30% of the population.
