= Ambodisakoana =

- Location in Madagascar
- Coordinates: 15°25′S 47°56′E
- Country: Madagascar
- Region: Sofia
- District: Boriziny
- Elevation: 38 m (125 ft)

Population (2001)
  - Total: 13,000
- Time zone: UTC3 (EAT)

Ambodisakoana is a town and commune (Malagasy: kaominina) in Madagascar. It belongs to the district of Boriziny, which is a part of Sofia Region. The population of the commune was estimated to be approximately 13,000 in 2001 commune census.

Ambodisakoana has a riverine harbour. Only primary schooling is available. The majority 95% of the population of the commune are farmers, while an additional 4.5% receives their livelihood from raising livestock. The most important crop is tobacco, while other important products are cotton, cassava and rice. Additionally fishing employs 0.5% of the population.
