= Geography of Madagascar =

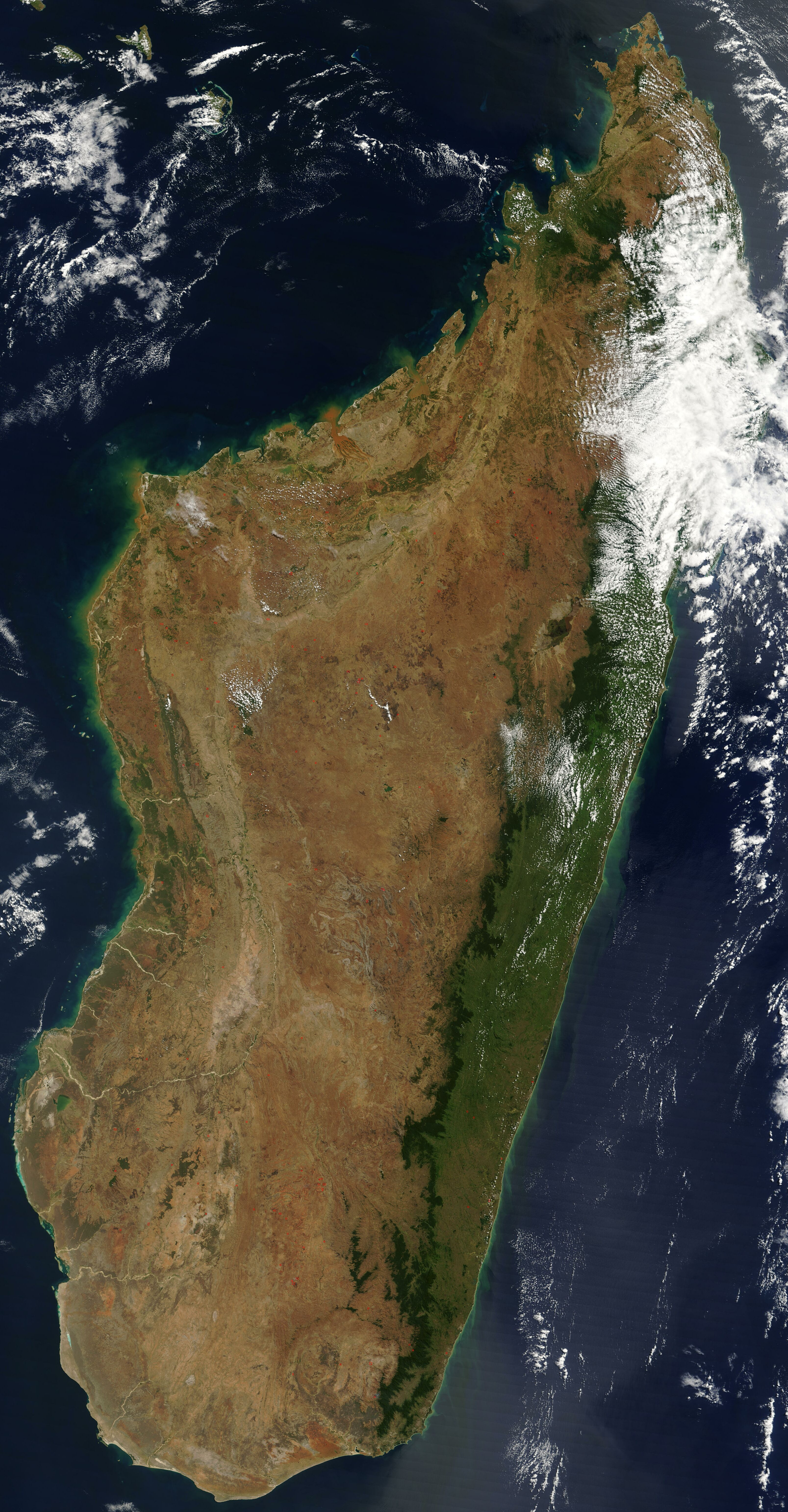
- Continent: Africa
- Region: Indian Ocean
- Coordinates: 20°00′S 47°00′E
- Area: Ranked 46th
  - Total: 587,041 km^{2} (226,658 sq mi)
  - Land: 99.7%
  - Water: 0.3%
- Coastline: 4,828 km (3,000 mi)
- Borders: None
- Highest point: Maromokotro; 2,876 metres (9,436 ft)
- Lowest point: Indian Ocean; 0 m
- Longest river: Mangoky
- Largest lake: Alaotra
- Exclusive economic zone: 1,225,259 km^{2} (473,075 mi^{2})

Madagascar is a island in the Indian Ocean located 400 kilometres (250 mi) off the eastern coast of Southern Africa, east of Mozambique. It has a total area of 587,040 square kilometres (226,660 sq mi) with 581,540 square kilometres (224,530 sq mi) of land and 6,900 square kilometres (2,700 sq mi) of water. Madagascar is the fourth-largest island in the world. The highest point is Maromokotro, in the Tsaratanana Massif region in the north of the island, at 2,876 metres (9,436 ft).

The Republic of Madagascar is the second-largest island country in the world at 587,040 square kilometres (226,660 sq mi). Its capital Antananarivo is in the Central Highlands near the centre of the island. It has the 25th largest exclusive economic zone of 1,225,259 km^{2} (473,075 mi^{2}).

== Geographical regions ==
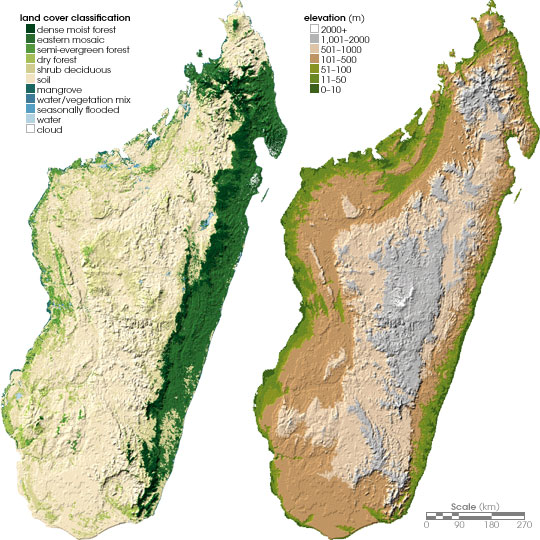
Land coverage (left) and topographical (right) maps of Madagascar

Madagascar can be divided into five general geographical regions: the east coast, the Tsaratanana Massif, the Central Highlands, the west coast, and the southwest. The highest elevations parallel the east coast.

=== East coast ===
The east coast consists of a narrow band of lowlands about fifty kilometres (31 mi) wide, formed from the sedimentation of alluvial soils, and an intermediate zone composed of steep bluffs alternating with ravines bordering an escarpment of about 500 metres (1,640 ft) in elevation, which gives access to the Central Highlands. The coastal region runs roughly from north of Baie d'Antongil, the most prominent feature on the Masoala Peninsula, to the far north of the island. The coastline is straight, with the exception of a bay, offering less in the way of natural harbors than the west coast.

The Canal des Pangalanes, an 800-kilometre-long (497 mi) lagoon formed naturally by the washing of sand up on the island by the Indian Ocean currents and by the silting of rivers, is a feature of the coast; it has been used both as a means of transportation up and down the coast and as a fishing area. The beach slopes steeply into deep water. The east coast is considered dangerous for swimmers and sailors because of the large number of sharks that frequent the shoreline.

=== Tsaratanana Massif ===
The Tsaratanana Massif region at the north end of the island contains Maromokotro, the highest point on the island at 2,880 metres (9,449 ft). Further north is the Montagne d'Ambre (Ambohitra), which is of volcanic origin. The coastline is deeply indented; two prominent features are the natural harbor at Antsiranana (Diego Suárez), just south of the Cap d'Ambre (Tanjon' i Bobaomby), and the large island of Nosy Be to the west. The mountainous topography of the Tsaratanana Massif limits the potential of the port at Antsiranana by impeding the flow of traffic from other parts of the island. They are a focus for big wall climbing.

=== Central Highlands ===
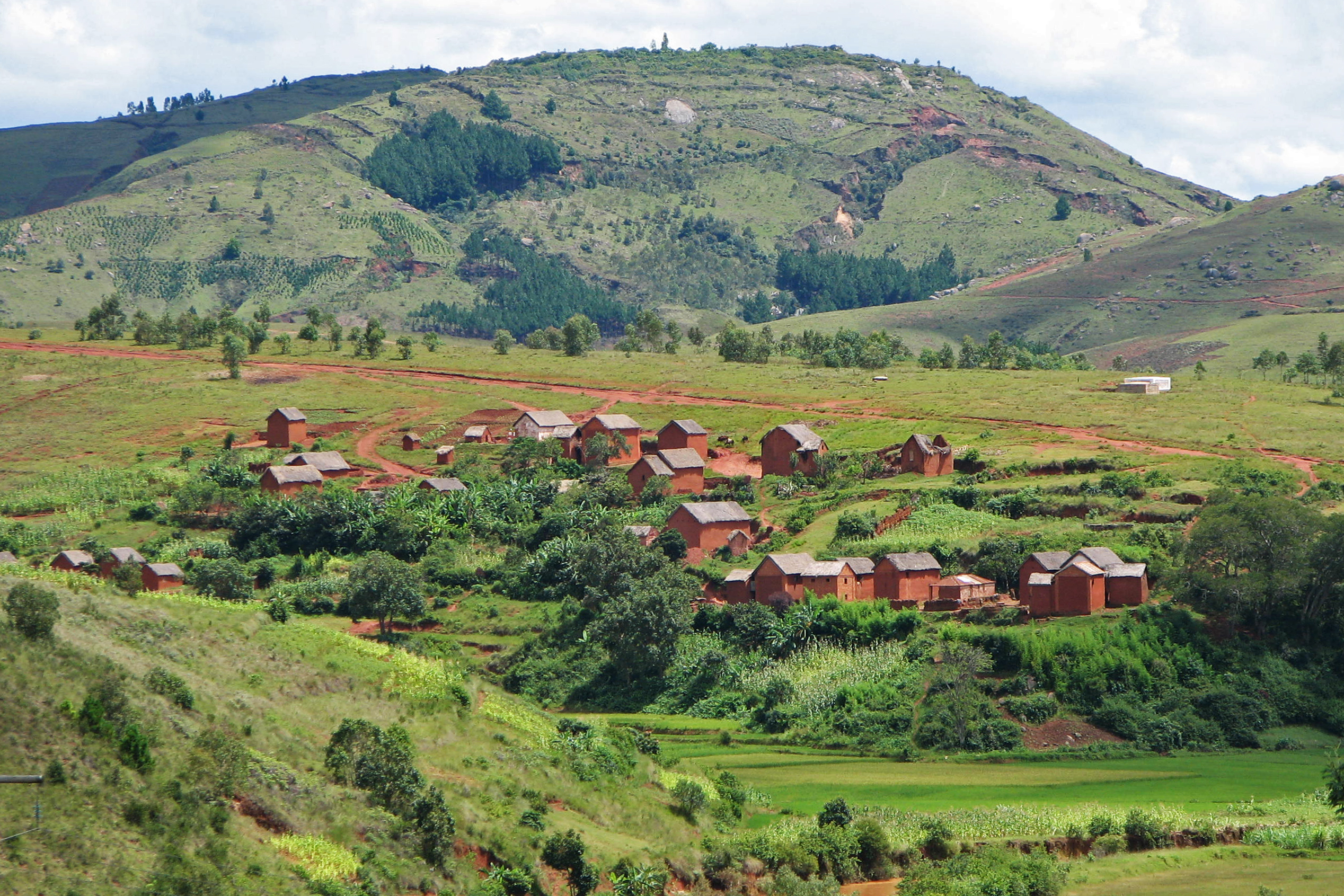
Village in the central highlands

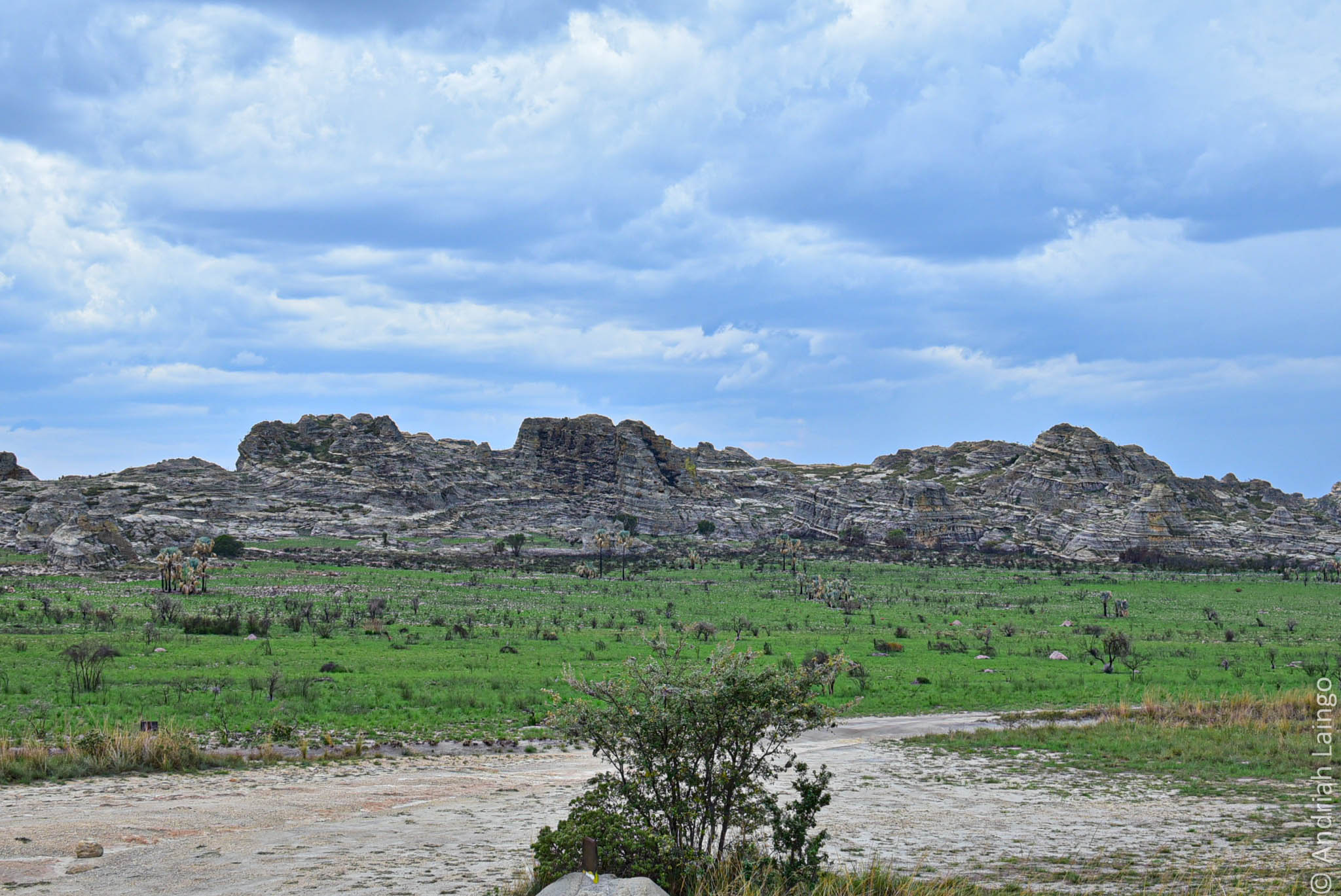
Landscape of the Isalo Rock Formations, Madagascar

The Central Highlands, which range from 800 to 1,800 m (2,625 to 5,906 ft) in elevation, contain a wide variety of topographies: rounded and eroded hills, massive granite outcrops, extinct volcanoes, eroded peneplains, and alluvial plains and marshes, which have been converted into irrigated rice fields. The Central Highlands extend from the Tsaratanana Massif in the north to the Ivakoany Massif in the south. They are defined rather clearly by the escarpments along the east coast, and they slope gently to the west coast. The Central Highlands include the Anjafy High Plateaus; the volcanic formations of Itasy (Lake Itasy is in a volcanic crater) and the Ankaratra Massif, reaching a height of 2,643 m (8,671 ft). The Isalo Ruiniform Massif lies between the central highlands and the west coast.

Antananarivo, the national capital, is located in the northern portion of the Central Highlands at 1,276 m (4,186 ft) above sea level. A prominent feature of the Central Highlands is a rift valley running north to south, located east of Antananarivo and including Lake Alaotra, the largest body of water on the island. The lake is located 761 m (2,497 ft) above sea level and is bordered by two cliffs, rising 701 m (2,300 ft) to the west and 488 m (1,601 ft) to the east, which form the walls of a valley. This region has experienced geological subsidence, and earth tremors are frequent.

=== West coast ===
The west coast, composed of sedimentary formations, is more indented than the east coast, thus offering a number of harbors sheltered from cyclones, such as the harbor at Mahajanga. Deep bays and well-protected harbors have attracted explorers, traders, and pirates from Europe, Africa, and the Middle East since ancient times; thus, the area has served as an important bridge between Madagascar and the outside world. Silting up of harbors on this coast, caused by sediment from the high levels of erosion suffered inland in Madagascar, is a major problem. The broad alluvial plains found on the coast between Mahajanga and Toliara, which are believed to have great agricultural potential, are thinly inhabited, in many places covered with swamps of Madagascar mangroves, and remain largely unexplored, although they are the subject of mineral and hydrocarbon exploration activity. The giant oil fields of Tsimiroro (heavy oil) and Bemolanga (ultra heavy oil) lie towards the west of the island.

=== Southwest ===
The southwest is bordered on the east by the Ivakoany Massif and on the north by the Isalo Ruiniform Massif. It includes two regions along the south coast, the Mahafaly Plateau and the desert region occupied by the Antandroy people.

=== Key minor islands ===
The minor islands of Madagascar, mostly located in the northwest, include major tourist destinations like the Nosy Be archipelago—comprising Nosy Be (the largest at 312 km²), Nosy Komba (Lemur Island), Nosy Sakatia (Orchid Island), and the marine reserve Nosy Tanikely—along with the volcanic Nosy Mitsio group, which contains the luxurious Tsarabanjina, and the Radama Islands (Nosy Kalakajoro and Nosy Berafia). Other significant islands are the aye-aye reserve Nosy Mangabe in Antongil Bay, the east coast's Île Sainte-Marie (Nosy Boraha) for whale watching, the two-island Nosy Iranja connected by a sandbar, the uninhabited, tsingy-featured Nosy Hara archipelago, the southern marine national park Nosy Ve-Androka near Toliara, and the remote French-administered Scattered Islands (like Europa and Juan de Nova) in the Mozambique Channel. These islands are collectively renowned for their beaches, diving, and unique biodiversity.

== Rivers and lakes ==
The Mananara and Mangoro rivers flow from the Central Highlands to the east coast, as does the Maningory, which flows from Lake Alaotra. Other rivers flowing east into the Indian Ocean include the Bemarivo, the Ivondro, and the Mananjary. These rivers tend to be short because the watershed is located close to the east coast. Owing to the steep elevations, they flow rapidly, often over spectacular waterfalls.

The rivers flowing to the west coast discharge into the Mozambique Channel and tend to be lengthier and have a lesser gradient. The major rivers on the west coast are the Sambirano, the Mahajamba, the Betsiboka (part of Mahajanga is located at the mouth), the Mania, the North and South Mahavavy, the Mangoky, and the Onilahy. The Ikopa, which flows past Antananarivo, is a tributary of the Betsiboka. The Onilahy, located in the driest part of the island, occasionally dries up during droughts.

Important lakes, aside from Alaotra, include Lake Kinkony in the northwest, Lake Itasy in the center and Lake Ihotry in the southwest.

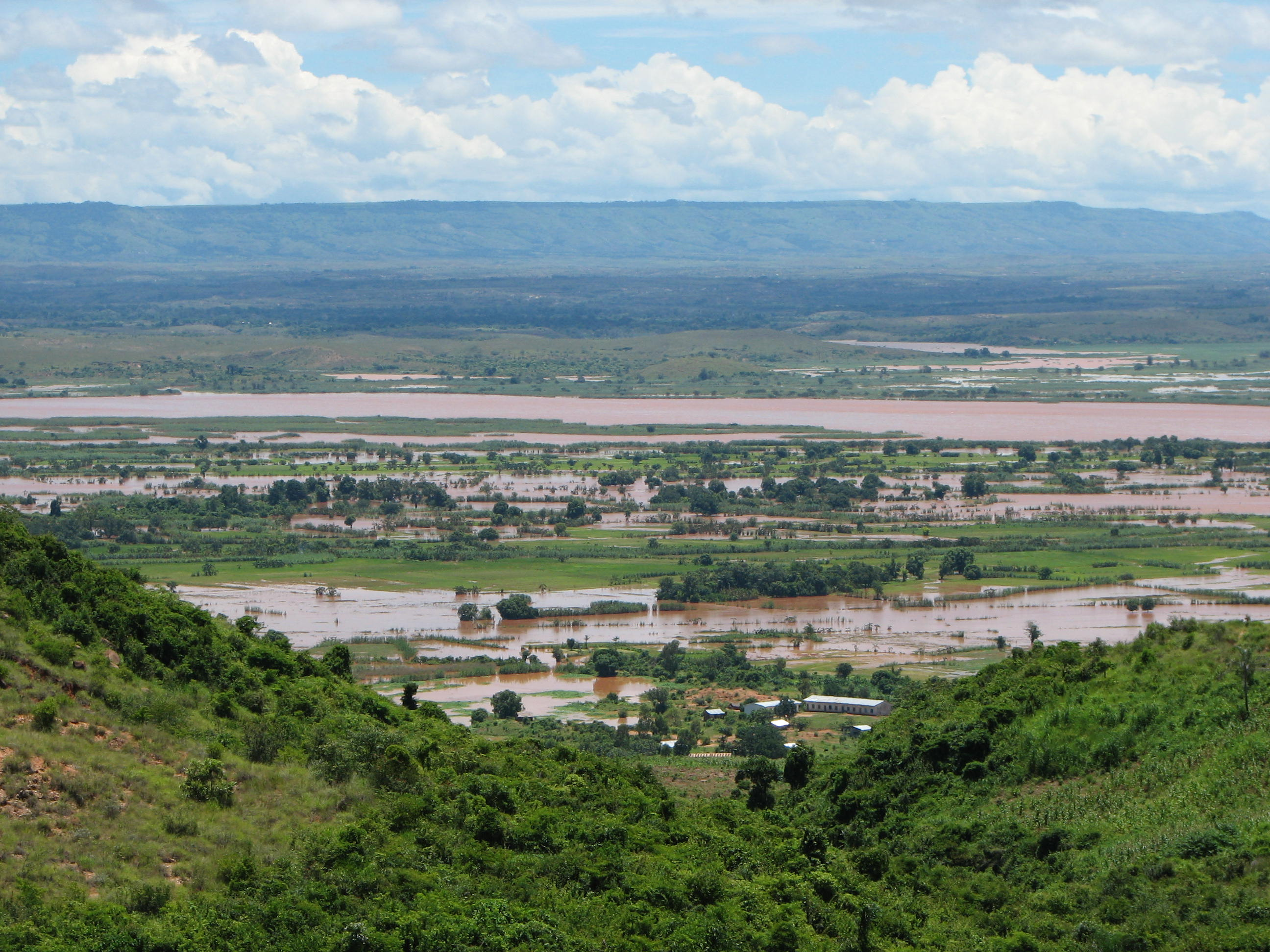
Majahilo river at Miandrivazo

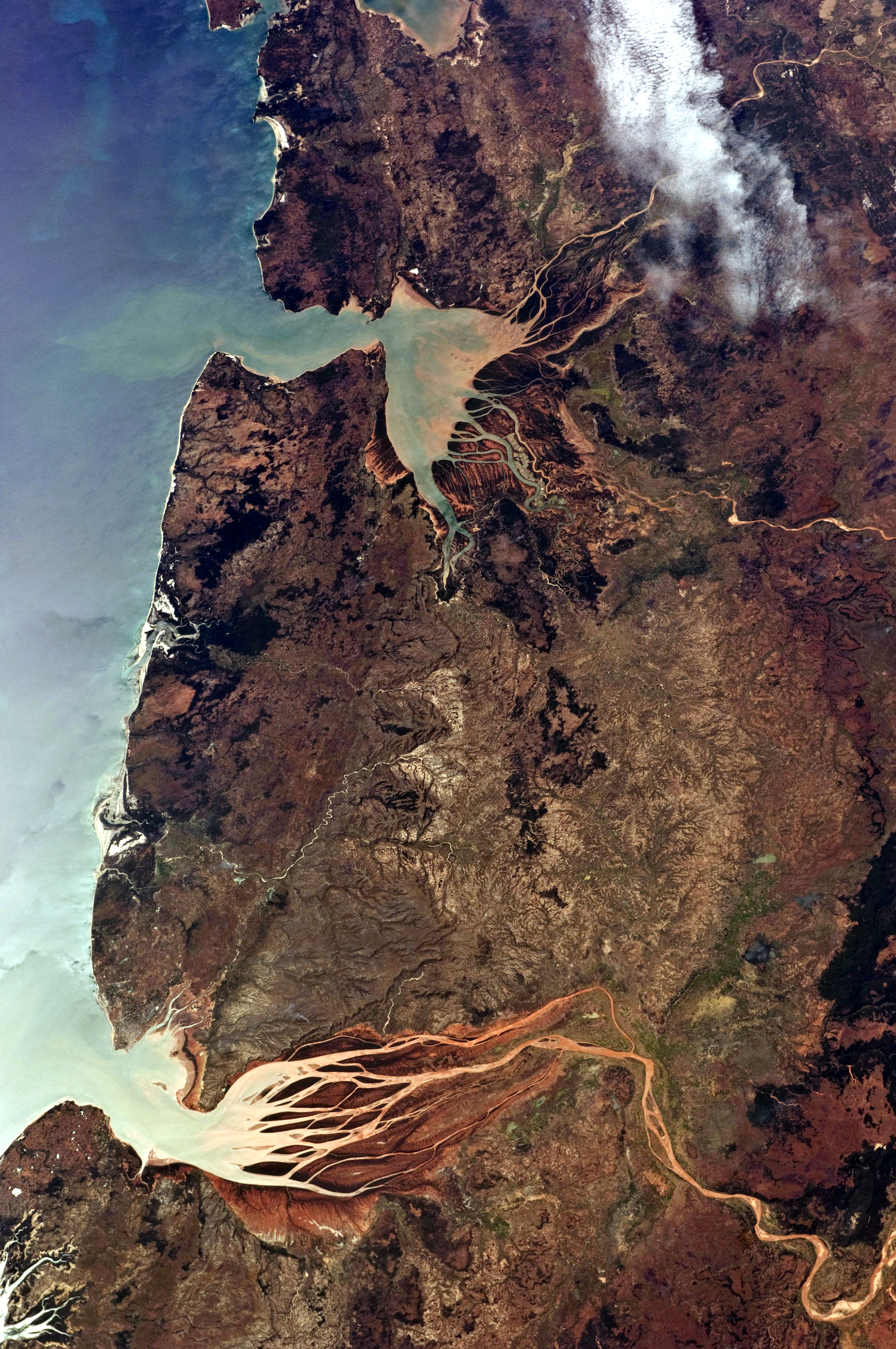
Bombetoka Bay and Mahajamba Bay

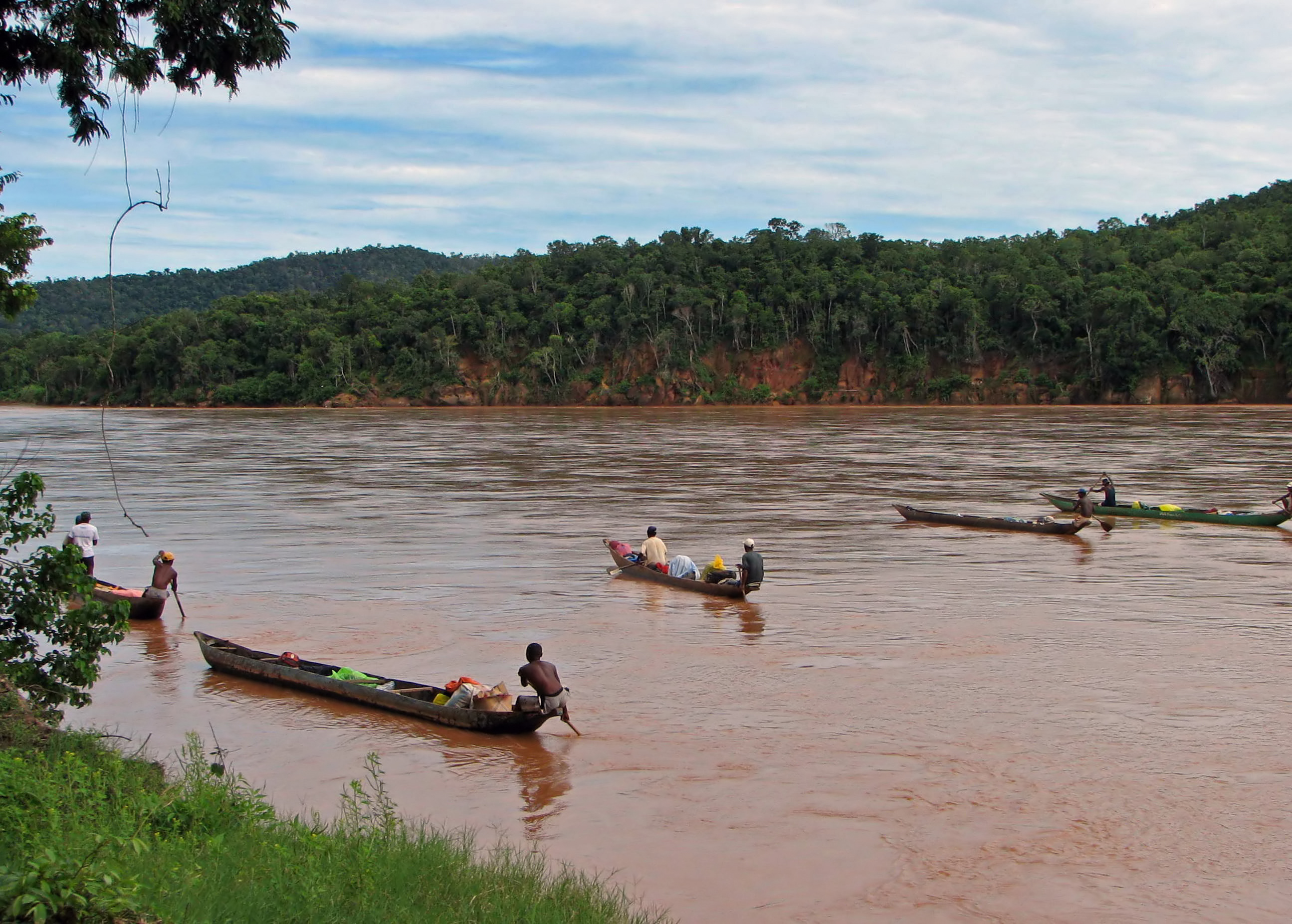
Tsiribihina River

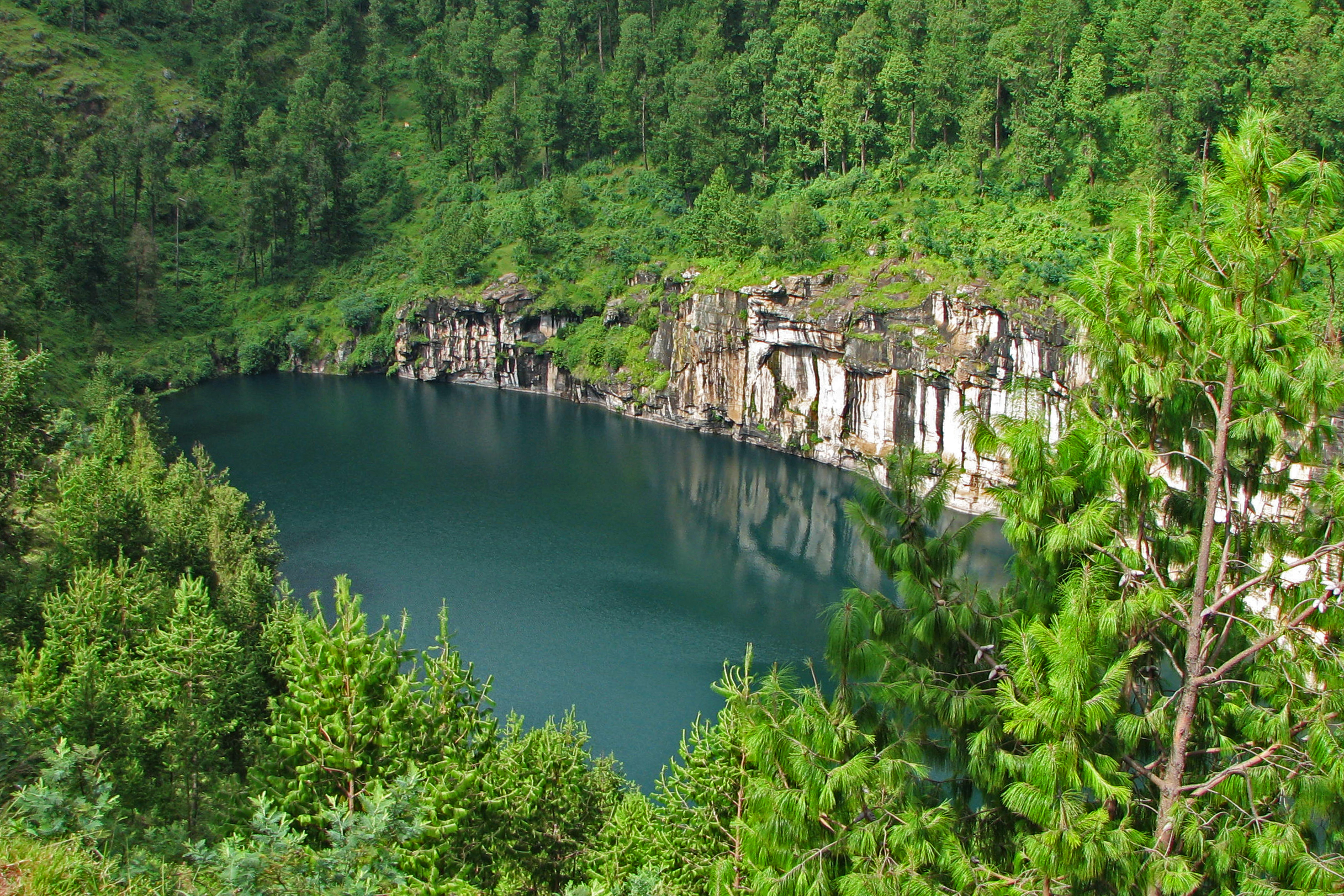
Lake Tritiva

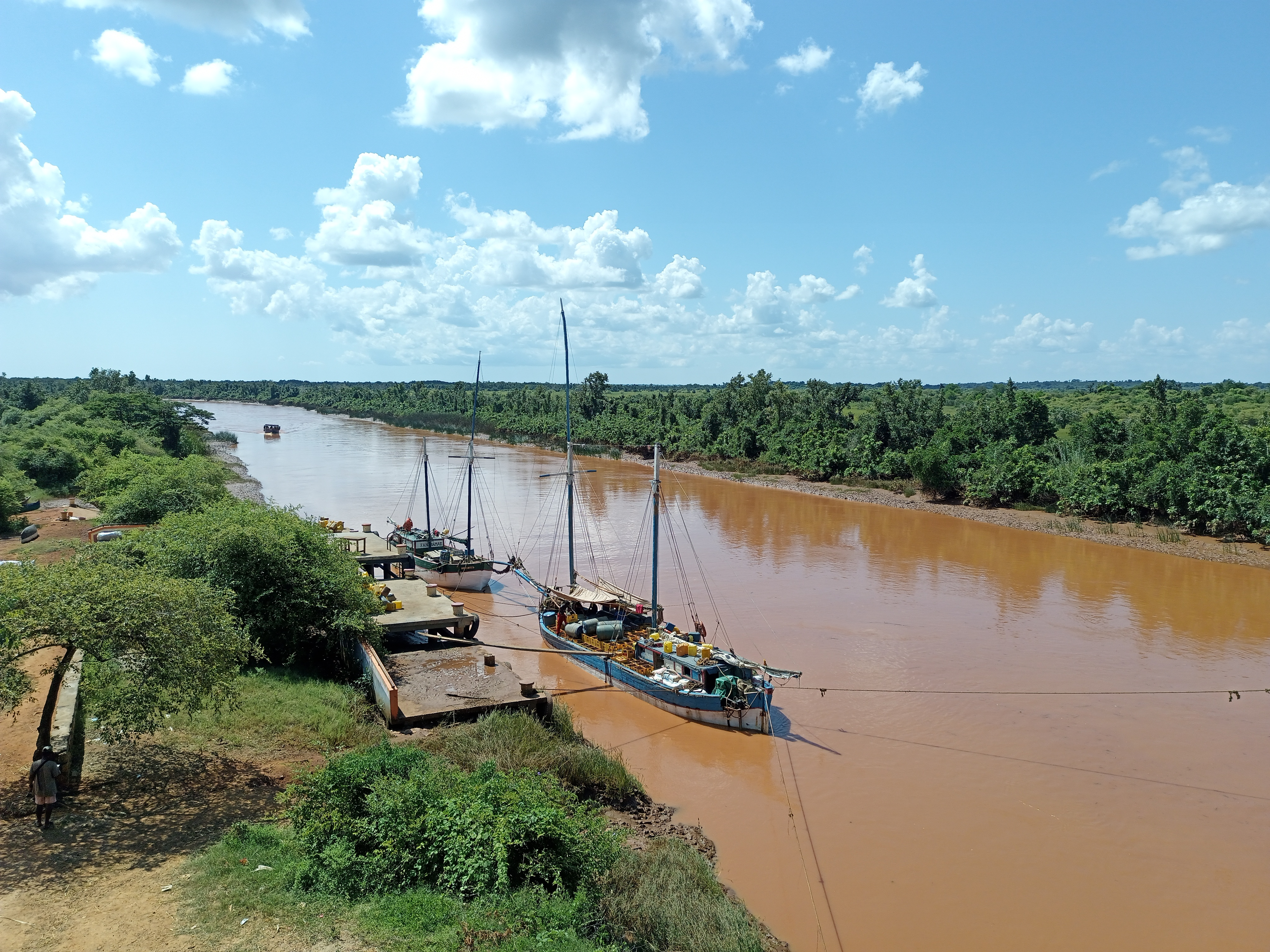
View of the ManingozaManingoza River

== Geographic features ==
=== Somali Plate ===
Madagascar originated as part of the Gondwana supercontinent. Its west coast was formed when Africa broke off from Gondwana around 165 million years ago. Madagascar eventually broke off from India about 88 million years ago. It is geologically located within the Somali Plate.

=== Soils ===
Madagascar has been called the "Great Red Island" because of the prominence of red lateritic soils. The red soils predominate the Central Highlands, although there are much richer soils in the regions of former volcanic activity, Itasy and Ankaratra, and Tsaratanana to the north. A narrow band of alluvial soils is found all along the east coast and at the mouths of the major rivers on the west coast; clay, sand, and limestone mixtures are found in the west; and shallow or skeletal laterite and limestone are located in the south. Deforestation and grazing cause aggressive erosion in many locations.

=== Tidal Flats ===
A 2019 global remote sensing analysis suggested that there were 1,748 square kilometres (675 sq mi) of tidal flats in Madagascar, making it the 18th ranked country in terms of how much tidal flat occurs there.

== Climate ==
Madagascar map of Köppen climate classification zones

The climate is tropical along the coast, temperate inland, and arid in the south. The weather is dominated by the southeastern trade winds that originate in the Indian Ocean anticyclone, a center of high atmospheric pressure that seasonally changes its position over the ocean. Madagascar has two seasons: a warm, wet season from November to April; and a cooler, dry season from May to October. There is, however, great variation in climate owing to elevation and position relative to dominant winds. Overall, surface water is most abundant along the east coast and in the far north (with the exception of the area around Cap d'Ambre, which has relatively little surface water). Amounts diminish to the west and south, and the driest regions are in the extreme south.

The east coast has a tropical rainforest climate; being most directly exposed to the trade winds, it has the highest rainfall, averaging as high as 4,000 mm (157.5 in) annually in some places. This region has a hot, humid climate in which tropical fevers are endemic. Destructive cyclones occur during the rainy season, coming in principally from the direction of the Mascarene Islands. Because rain clouds discharge much of their moisture east of the highest elevations on the island, the Central Highlands are drier and, owing to the altitude, also cooler. Thunderstorms are common during the rainy season in the Central Highlands and the eastern coastal lowlands.

Antananarivo receives practically all of its average annual 1,400 mm (55.1 in) of rainfall between November and April. The dry season is sunny, although somewhat chilly, especially in the mornings. Although frosts are rare in Antananarivo, they are common at higher elevations. Hail is common in many of the higher areas of the island (including Antananarivo), but there is no snowfall except on the Ankaratra massif where above 2,400 m (7,874 ft) it may occasionally fall and even remain for several days.

The west coast is drier than either the east coast or the Central Highlands because the trade winds lose their humidity by the time they reach this region. The southwest and the extreme south are semidesert; as little as 330 mm (13 in) of rain falls annually at Toliara.

Climate data for Antananarivo (1981–2010)
Month	Jan	Feb	Mar	Apr	May	Jun	Jul	Aug	Sep	Oct	Nov	Dec	Year
Record high °C (°F)	33.0 (91.4)	32.0 (89.6)	33.0 (91.4)	31.8 (89.2)	30.2 (86.4)	32.6 (90.7)	27.0 (80.6)	28.9 (84.0)	32.3 (90.1)	33.1 (91.6)	33.3 (91.9)	32.1 (89.8)	33.3 (91.9)
Mean daily maximum °C (°F)	26.6 (79.9)	26.5 (79.7)	26.5 (79.7)	25.5 (77.9)	23.7 (74.7)	21.2 (70.2)	20.6 (69.1)	21.7 (71.1)	24.2 (75.6)	26.0 (78.8)	27.0 (80.6)	27.2 (81.0)	24.7 (76.5)
Daily mean °C (°F)	20.8 (69.4)	20.8 (69.4)	20.7 (69.3)	19.5 (67.1)	17.3 (63.1)	15.1 (59.2)	14.3 (57.7)	14.9 (58.8)	16.8 (62.2)	18.7 (65.7)	20.1 (68.2)	20.7 (69.3)	18.3 (64.9)
Mean daily minimum °C (°F)	17.3 (63.1)	17.3 (63.1)	17.0 (62.6)	15.4 (59.7)	13.2 (55.8)	10.9 (51.6)	9.9 (49.8)	10.3 (50.5)	11.4 (52.5)	13.6 (56.5)	15.2 (59.4)	16.7 (62.1)	14.0 (57.2)
Record low °C (°F)	10.9 (51.6)	11.0 (51.8)	10.0 (50.0)	9.0 (48.2)	4.0 (39.2)	2.0 (35.6)	2.0 (35.6)	4.4 (39.9)	2.3 (36.1)	6.0 (42.8)	9.3 (48.7)	10.5 (50.9)	2.0 (35.6)
Average precipitation mm (inches)	340 (13.4)	290 (11.4)	191 (7.5)	55 (2.2)	19 (0.7)	4 (0.2)	8 (0.3)	6 (0.2)	10 (0.4)	68 (2.7)	135 (5.3)	311 (12.2)	1,437 (56.5)
Average rainy days	19	17	14	7	5	5	7	6	4	8	11	15	118
Average relative humidity (%)	79	80	79	77	77	77	76	74	70	69	71	77	76
Mean monthly sunshine hours	210.5	178.0	199.1	220.5	228.8	206.1	213.9	235.0	249.5	251.0	232.7	201.1	2,626.2
Source 1: NOAA
Source 2: Pogoda

Climate data for Toamasina (1961–1990, extremes 1889–present)
Month	Jan	Feb	Mar	Apr	May	Jun	Jul	Aug	Sep	Oct	Nov	Dec	Year
Record high °C (°F)	37.4 (99.3)	38.6 (101.5)	36.7 (98.1)	35.0 (95.0)	34.0 (93.2)	29.6 (85.3)	31.2 (88.2)	30.2 (86.4)	30.6 (87.1)	33.2 (91.8)	33.0 (91.4)	33.6 (92.5)	38.6 (101.5)
Mean daily maximum °C (°F)	30.1 (86.2)	30.3 (86.5)	29.5 (85.1)	28.8 (83.8)	27.3 (81.1)	25.6 (78.1)	24.8 (76.6)	24.9 (76.8)	25.8 (78.4)	26.9 (80.4)	28.4 (83.1)	29.4 (84.9)	27.6 (81.7)
Daily mean °C (°F)	26.0 (78.8)	26.1 (79.0)	25.5 (77.9)	24.6 (76.3)	22.9 (73.2)	21.1 (70.0)	20.4 (68.7)	20.5 (68.9)	21.3 (70.3)	22.7 (72.9)	24.3 (75.7)	25.5 (77.9)	23.4 (74.1)
Mean daily minimum °C (°F)	22.5 (72.5)	22.7 (72.9)	22.4 (72.3)	21.4 (70.5)	19.5 (67.1)	17.8 (64.0)	17.1 (62.8)	17.0 (62.6)	17.3 (63.1)	18.7 (65.7)	20.4 (68.7)	21.9 (71.4)	19.9 (67.8)
Record low °C (°F)	18.0 (64.4)	17.5 (63.5)	17.0 (62.6)	15.0 (59.0)	13.2 (55.8)	11.0 (51.8)	11.8 (53.2)	10.0 (50.0)	11.0 (51.8)	11.0 (51.8)	13.5 (56.3)	16.0 (60.8)	10.0 (50.0)
Average rainfall mm (inches)	410.1 (16.15)	382.1 (15.04)	478.4 (18.83)	322.8 (12.71)	228.3 (8.99)	259.0 (10.20)	288.6 (11.36)	218.2 (8.59)	121.1 (4.77)	132.6 (5.22)	169.7 (6.68)	357.3 (14.07)	3,368.2 (132.61)
Average rainy days (≥ 1.0 mm)	19	17	21	18	17	18	22	20	15	13	14	17	211
Average relative humidity (%)	83	83	85	84	85	85	84	85	83	82	83	84	84
Mean monthly sunshine hours	224.7	198.2	191.0	196.9	192.1	162.5	162.8	184.6	209.7	232.7	236.0	219.2	2,410.4
Source 1: NOAA
Source 2: Deutscher Wetterdienst (humidity, 1951–1967), Meteo Climat (record highs and lows)

Climate data for Toliara (Tulear), Madagascar (1961–1990, extremes 1951–present)
Month	Jan	Feb	Mar	Apr	May	Jun	Jul	Aug	Sep	Oct	Nov	Dec	Year
Record high °C (°F)	42.3 (108.1)	39.0 (102.2)	39.7 (103.5)	38.5 (101.3)	37.4 (99.3)	35.7 (96.3)	34.5 (94.1)	37.5 (99.5)	37.5 (99.5)	39.5 (103.1)	37.7 (99.9)	38.7 (101.7)	42.3 (108.1)
Mean daily maximum °C (°F)	32.2 (90.0)	32.3 (90.1)	32.0 (89.6)	30.6 (87.1)	28.6 (83.5)	26.9 (80.4)	26.8 (80.2)	27.7 (81.9)	28.5 (83.3)	29.3 (84.7)	30.3 (86.5)	31.3 (88.3)	29.8 (85.6)
Daily mean °C (°F)	27.5 (81.5)	27.5 (81.5)	26.8 (80.2)	25.0 (77.0)	22.7 (72.9)	20.7 (69.3)	20.3 (68.5)	21.0 (69.8)	22.3 (72.1)	23.9 (75.0)	25.3 (77.5)	26.6 (79.9)	24.1 (75.4)
Mean daily minimum °C (°F)	22.9 (73.2)	22.9 (73.2)	21.9 (71.4)	19.9 (67.8)	16.9 (62.4)	14.8 (58.6)	14.4 (57.9)	14.8 (58.6)	16.2 (61.2)	18.5 (65.3)	20.3 (68.5)	22.1 (71.8)	18.8 (65.8)
Record low °C (°F)	14.6 (58.3)	15.0 (59.0)	16.8 (62.2)	10.0 (50.0)	10.2 (50.4)	4.2 (39.6)	8.4 (47.1)	10.0 (50.0)	9.0 (48.2)	11.8 (53.2)	14.0 (57.2)	17.0 (62.6)	4.2 (39.6)
Average rainfall mm (inches)	94.7 (3.73)	88.7 (3.49)	35.9 (1.41)	17.7 (0.70)	15.8 (0.62)	14.9 (0.59)	6.2 (0.24)	5.6 (0.22)	7.8 (0.31)	11.9 (0.47)	21.7 (0.85)	97.0 (3.82)	417.9 (16.45)
Average rainy days (≥ 1.0 mm)	6	6	3	2	2	2	1	1	1	1	2	5	32
Average relative humidity (%)	77	77	75	76	75	74	74	72	74	75	75	77	75
Mean monthly sunshine hours	310.7	271.9	299.9	289.4	296.4	282.5	295.3	315.4	304.4	314.3	316.2	300.6	3,597
Source 1: NOAA
Source 2: Deutscher Wetterdienst (humidity, 1951–1980), Meteo Climat (record highs and lows)

=== Climate change ===
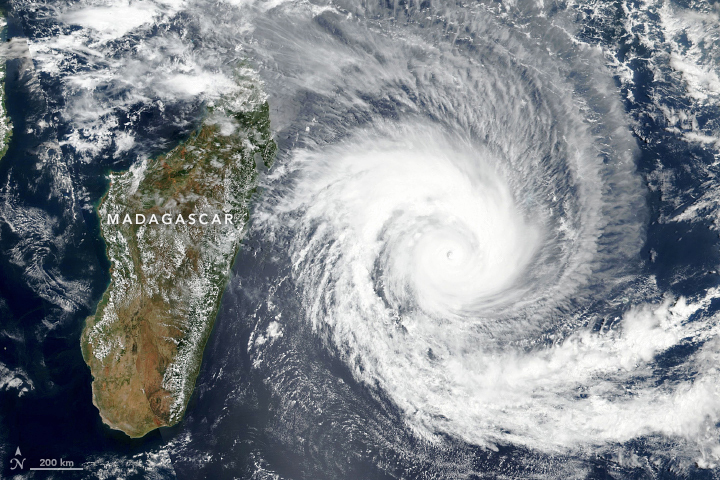
Satellite image of Cyclone Batsirai approaching Madagascar. Tropical cyclones are set to become more intense in the country due to climate change.

Climate change is a significant threat to Madagascar's environment and people. Climate change has raised temperatures, made the dry season longer and has resulted in more intense tropical storms. The country's unique ecosystems, animal and plant life are being impacted.

Climate change is projected to drive declines in coral reefs and forest habitats, and threaten native species such as lemurs. The human population is highly vulnerable due to severe impacts on water and agriculture, with implications for food security. Infectious diseases are also expected to increase. Madagascar is a signatory to the Paris Agreement and has set out goals for climate change adaptation, although their implementation faces challenges due to country's relative poverty.

=== Cyclones ===
Madagascar occasionally experiences the impact of cyclones. During February 2–4, 1994, Madagascar was struck by Cyclone Geralda. The cyclone killed seventy people and destroyed enough property to leave approximately 500,000 homeless, including 30,000 in Antananarivo and 80,000 in Toamasina. The cyclone also significantly damaged the country's infrastructure, most notably coastal roads, railroads, and telecommunications, as well as agriculture. The damage was estimated at US$45 million.

During March 1–18, 2004, Madagascar was impacted by Cyclone Gafilo, the most intense tropical cyclone ever recorded in the South-West Indian Ocean. The National Rescue Council in Antananarivo reported 237 dead, 181 missing, 879 injured, and 304,000 homeless (174,000 in Antalaha alone). More than 20,000 homes were destroyed, as well as 413 public buildings and 3,400 schools were damaged, including 1,400 schools completely destroyed. The Cyclone left an estimated damage of US$250 million.

In February 2022, Cyclone Batsirai killed at least 10 people and caused floods, power outages, and structural damages, mere weeks after Cyclone Ana had killed 55 and displaced 130,000 people on the island.

== Flora and fauna ==
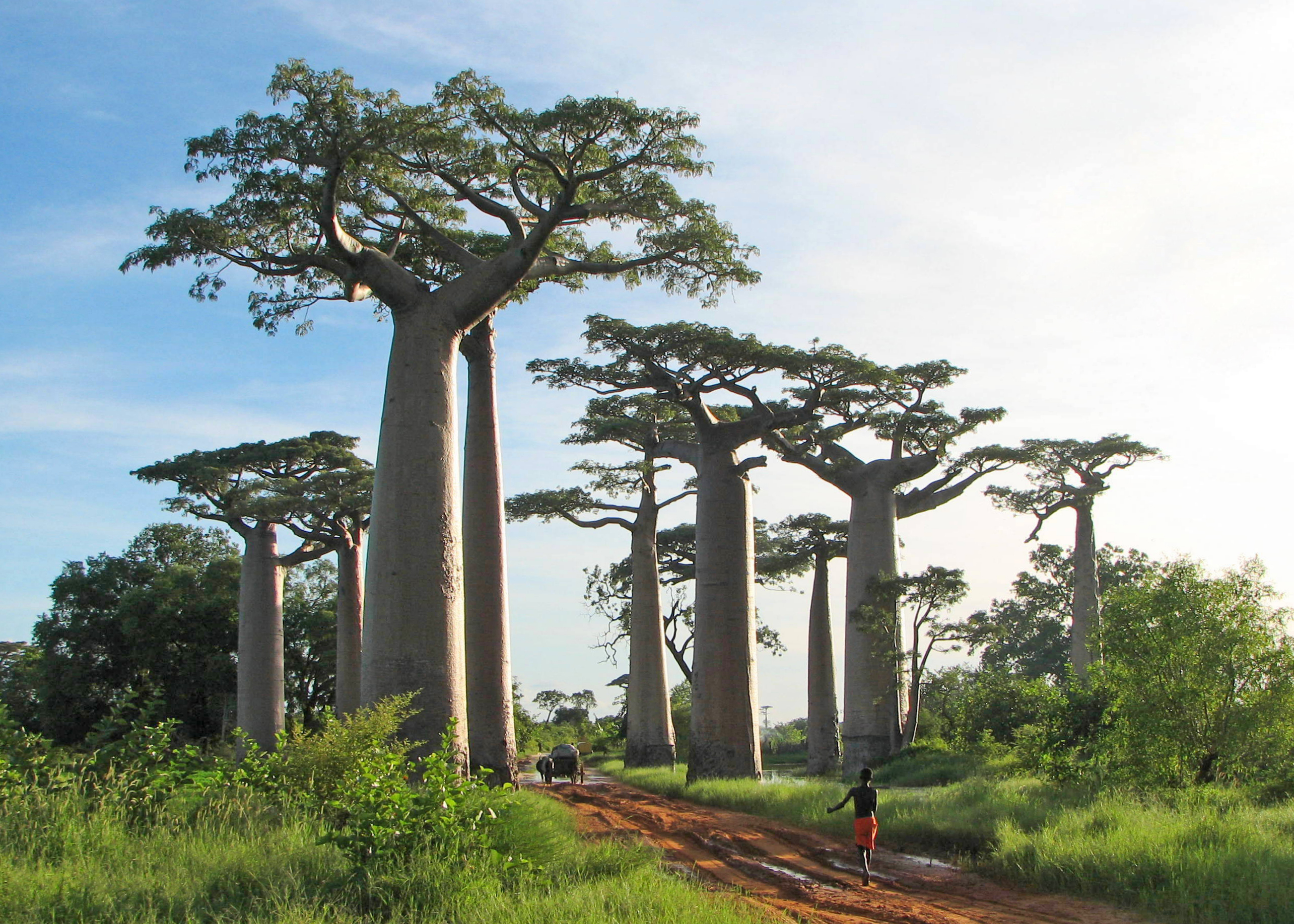
Baobabs near Morondava

The island of Madagascar has been described as an "alternate world" or a "world apart" because of the uniqueness and rarity of many of its plant and animal species. Their characteristics are believed to reflect the island's origins as a part of Gondwanaland and its many millions of years of isolation following the breakup of the landmass. As a result of this isolation, 90% of species found in Madagascar are unique to the island.

Many of the characteristic African species—large mammals such as the elephant, rhinoceros, giraffe, zebra, and antelope and predators such as lions and leopards—do not exist in Madagascar. In addition, the island has been spared the great variety of venomous snakes indigenous to the African continent. Although it is assumed that most life forms on the island had an African (or South American) origin, isolation has allowed old species—elsewhere extinct—to survive and new species unique to the island to evolve. Thus, a great number of plant, insect, reptile, and fish species are endemic to Madagascar, and all indigenous land mammal species—66 in all—are unique to the island.

Madagascar was once covered almost completely by forests, but slash and burn practices for dry rice cultivation has denuded most of the landscape, especially in the Central Highlands. Rain forests are concentrated on the steep hillsides along a slender north–south axis bordering the east coast, from the Tsaratanana Massif in the north to Tolagnaro in the south. Secondary growth, which has replaced the original forest and consists to a large extent of traveller's trees, raffia palm, and baobabs, is found in many places along the east coast and in the north. The vegetation of the Central Highlands and the west coast is for the most part savanna or steppe, and coarse prairie grass predominates where erosion has not exposed the orange-red lateritic soil. In the southwest, the vegetation is adapted to desert conditions.

The remaining rain forest contains a great number of unique plant species. The country has some 900 species of orchid. Bananas, mangoes, coconut, vanilla, and other tropical plants grow on the coasts, and the eucalyptus tree, brought from Australia, is widespread today.

Wood and charcoal from the forests are used to meet 80% of domestic fuel needs. As a result, wood has become scarce. In 1990, the World Bank launched an environmental program that has increased the planting of pine and eucalyptus to satisfy fuel needs.

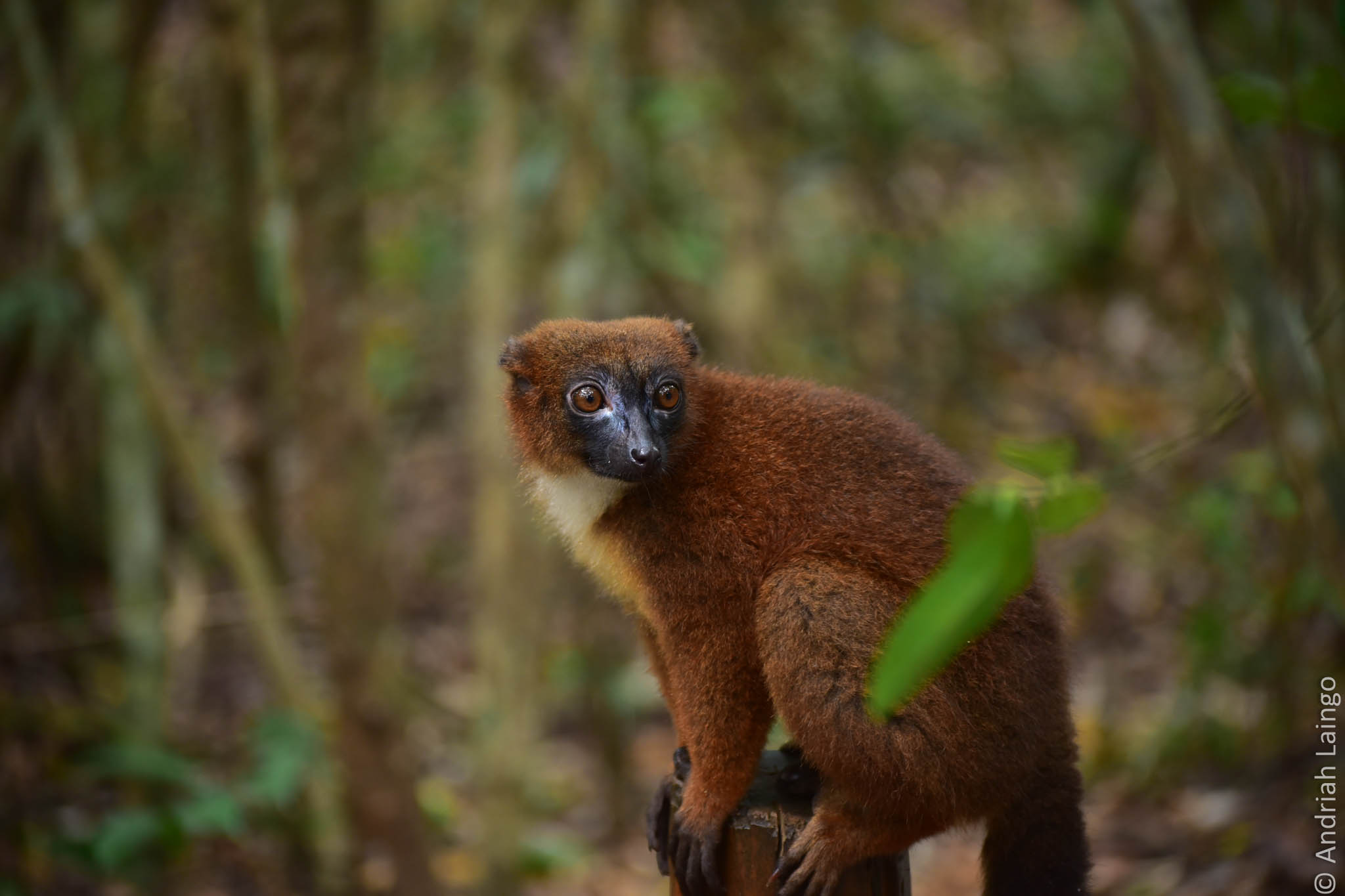

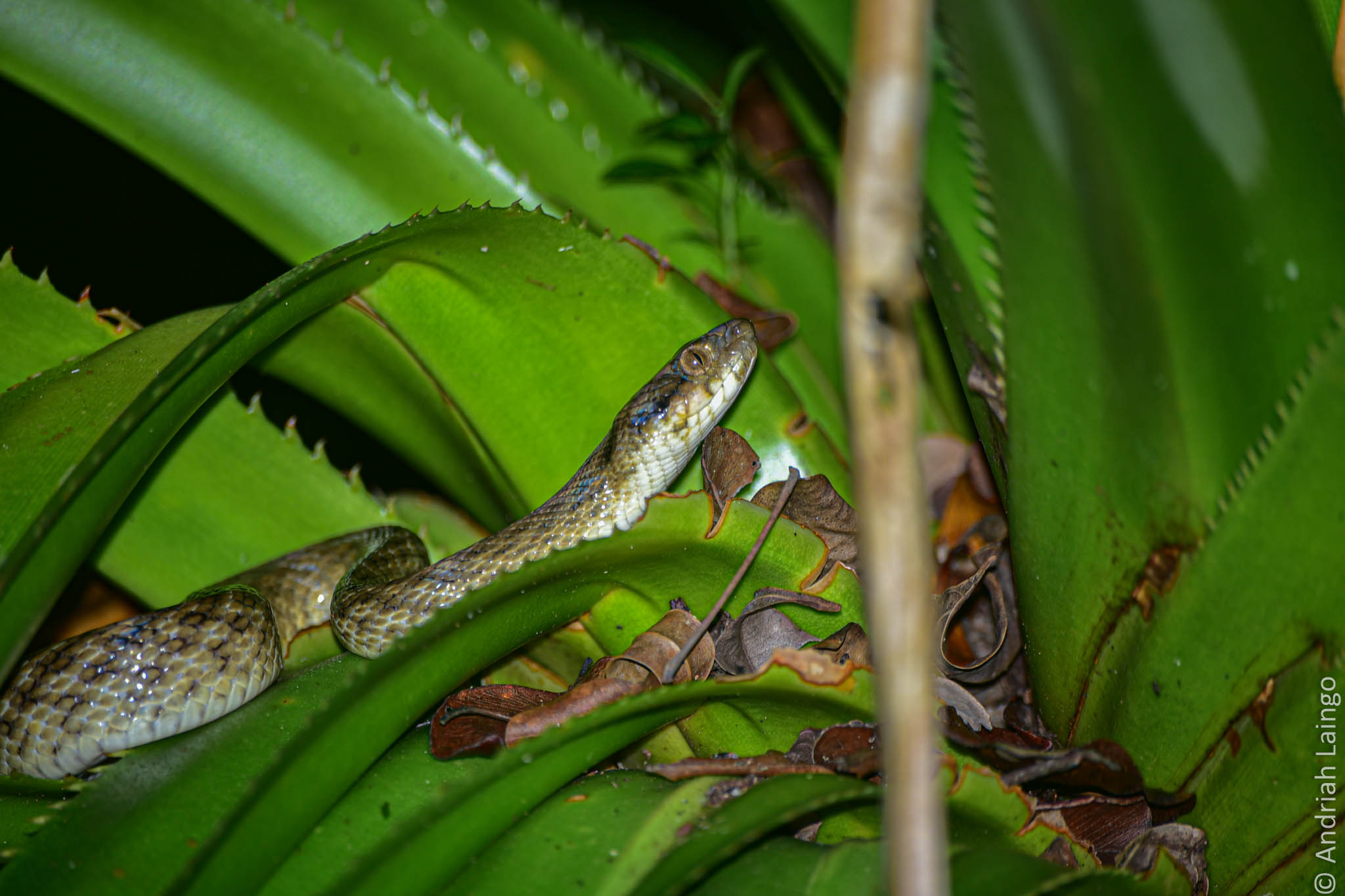

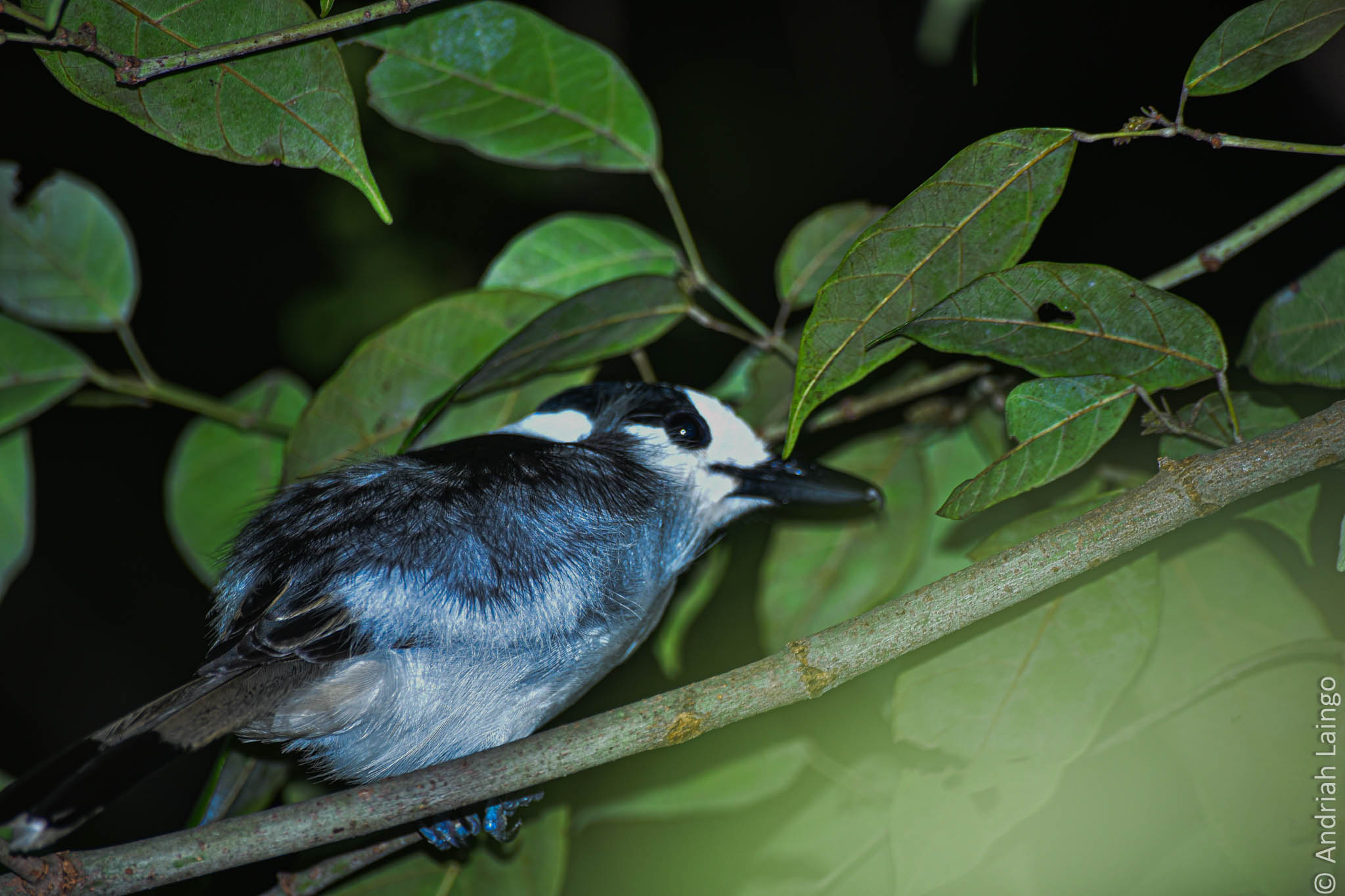

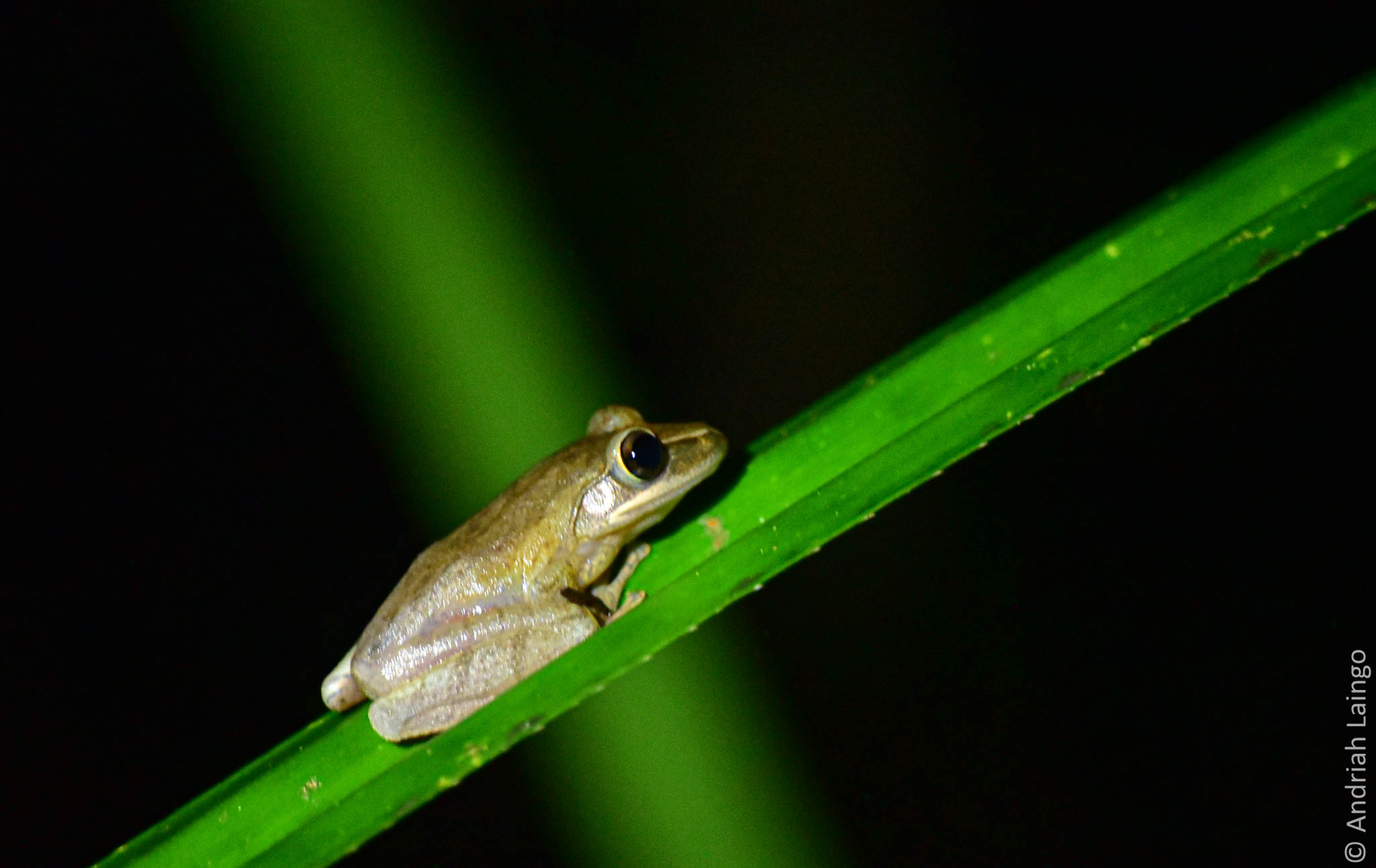

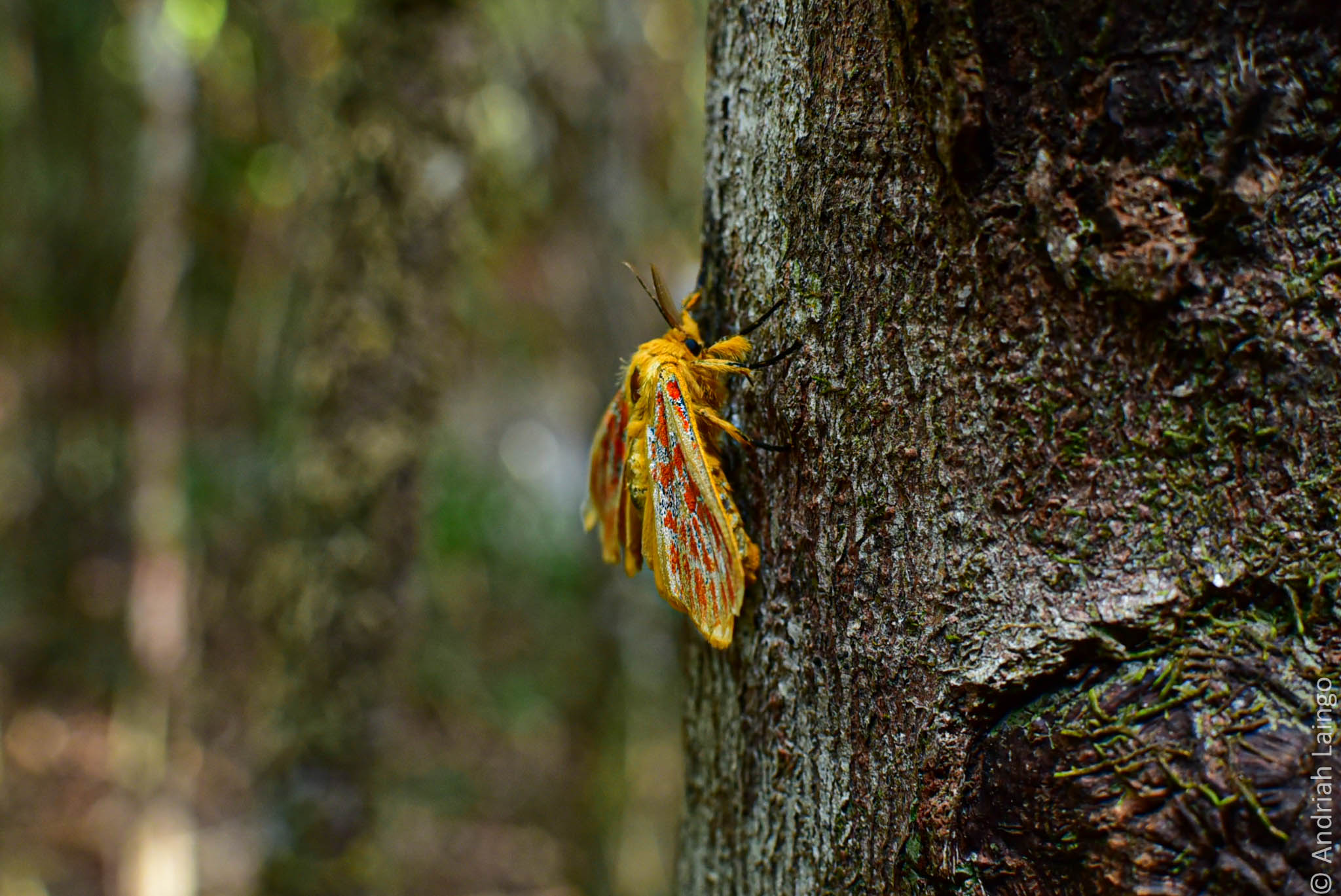

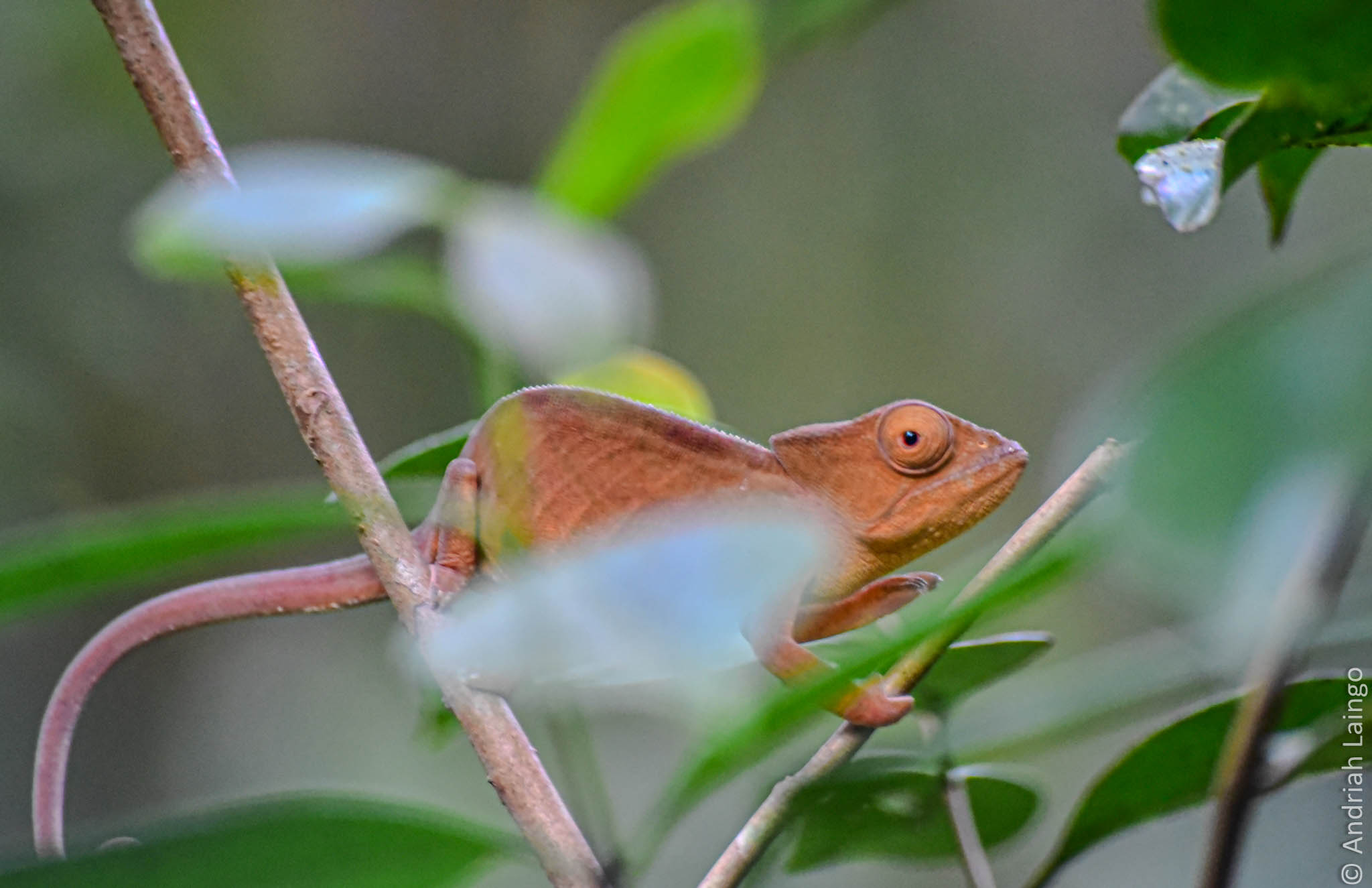

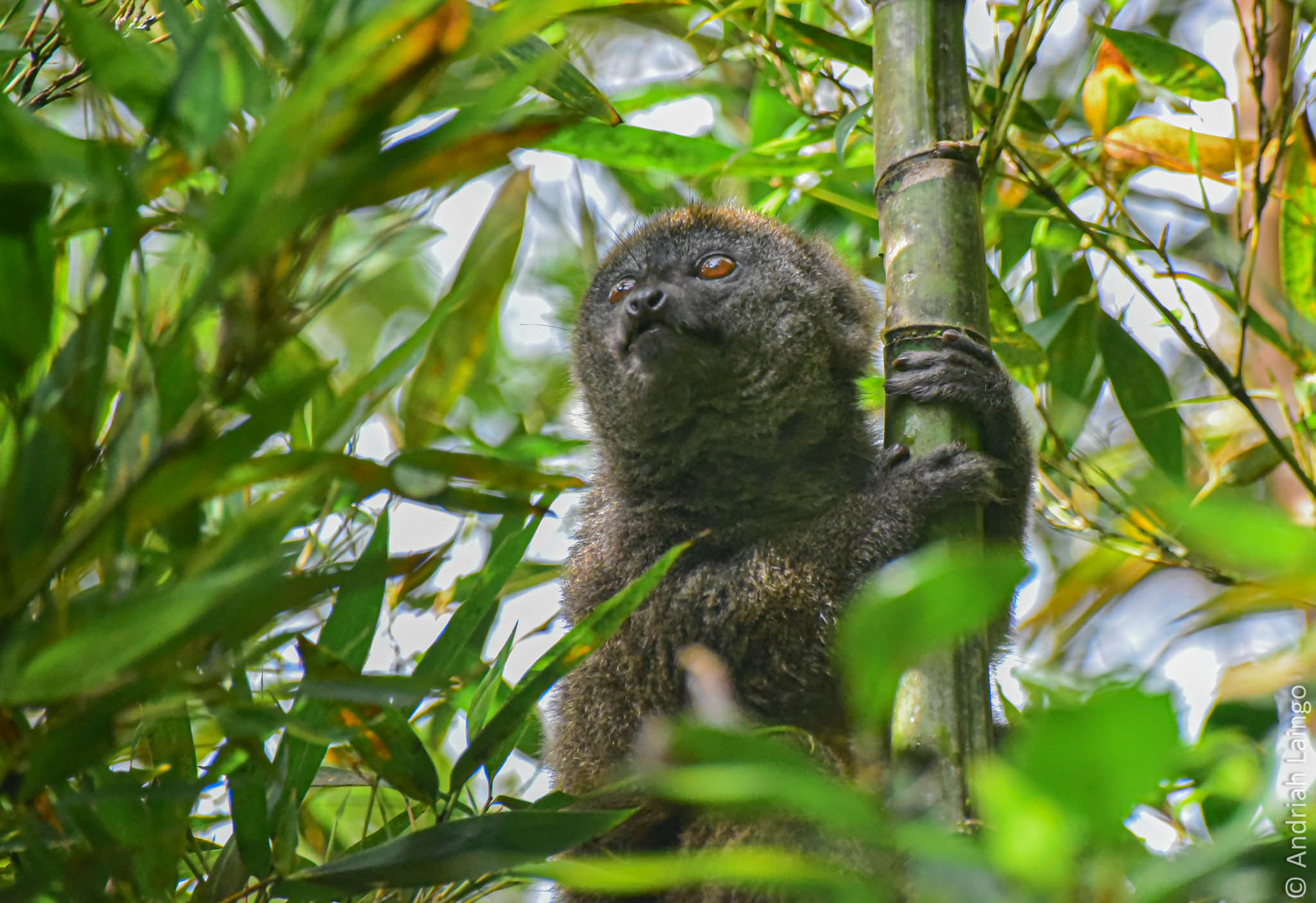

== Natural resources ==
Madagascar has a number of natural resources, including nickel, cobalt, graphite, chromite, coal, bauxite, rare Earth elements, salt, quartz, tar sands, semi-precious stones and mica. There are also fishing areas offshore and potential for hydropower. In 2011, it was estimated that 5.96% of the land area was used for arable land and 1.02% had permanent crops. Twenty-six percent of the land is forested. The majority of the population depends on subsistence farming, largely rice and cattle. The manufacturing sector is small but growing.

== Environmental issues ==
Madagascar is currently suffering in some areas from soil erosion as a result of deforestation and overgrazing, desertification, and contamination of surface water with raw sewage and organic waste. Several species of flora and fauna that are unique to the islands are endangered. Regular cyclones cause flooding in low-lying coastal regions.

== Extreme points ==
This is a list of the extreme points of Madagascar, the points that are farther north, south, east or west than any other location.

- Northernmost Point - Cap D'Ambre, Antsiranana Province at 11°57′00″S 49°15′56″E
- Easternmost Point - Ile Ngontsy, Antsiranana Province at 15°15′48″S 50°29′36″E
- Easternmost point (mainland) - Cap Est, Antsiranana Province at 15°15′56″S 50°29′10″E
- Southernmost Point - Cape Vohimena (Cap Sainte Marie), Toliara Province at 25°36′24″S 45°10′02″E
- Westernmost Point - Nosy Hao, Toliara Province at 22°05′13″S 43°11′18″E
- Westernmost Point (mainland) - Pointe Mananonoka, Toliara Province at 22°15′04″S 43°13′13″E
- Geographic center - TBA
- Geographic center (mainland) - Analavory, Itasy Region

== See also ==
- List of cities in Madagascar
- List of rivers of Madagascar
- Ecoregions of Madagascar
- Geographic data related to Geography of Madagascar at OpenStreetMap
