= Mahajamba River =

River in Madagascar

Mahajamba
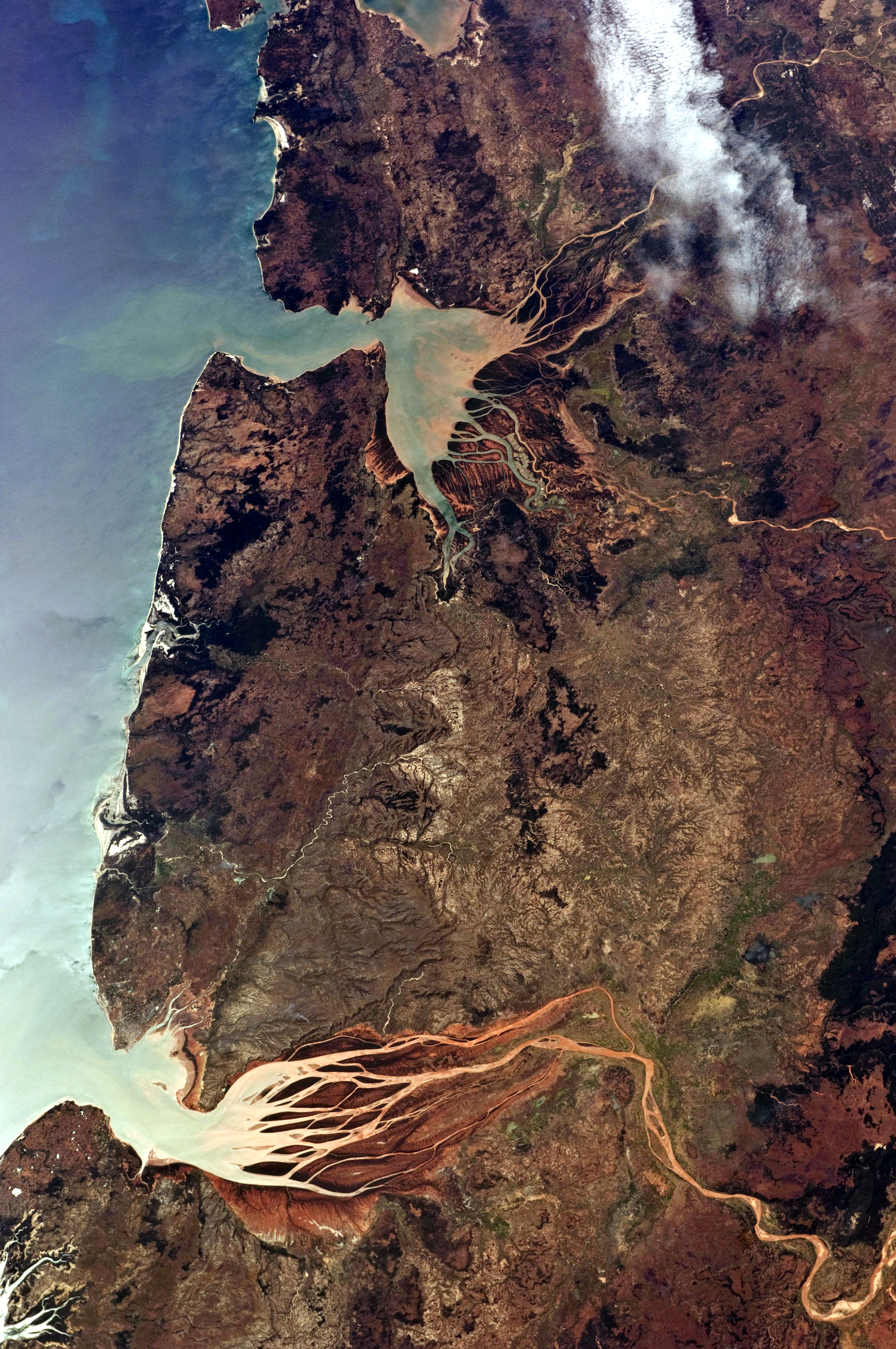
- Estuaries in northern Madagascar. Rivers from left to right: Betsiboka, Mahajamba, Sofia

Physical characteristics
- Source: Central Highlands
  - location: Madagascar
  - coordinates: 18°1′16″S 47°46′29″E
  - elevation: 1,204 m (3,950 ft)
- Mouth: Indian Ocean
  - location: Boeny and Sofia Region, Madagascar
  - coordinates: 15°27′15″S 47°4′37″E
  - elevation: 0 m (0 ft)
- Length: 298 km (185 mi)
- Basin size: 15,500 km^{2} (6,000 sq mi)
- Discharge
  - location: Mahajamba Delta
  - average: (Period: 1971–2000)483 m^{3}/s (17,100 cu ft/s)

Basin features
- River system: Mahajamba River
- Tributaries
  - left: Bemovo
  - right: Amparanarona, Tsilaninarivo, Menazomby, Kimangoro

The Mahajamba is a river of northern Madagascar. It flows through Ankarafantsika National Park. The river is surrounded in mangroves.
