= Sofia River =

River in northwestern Madagascar

Coordinates: 15°25′48″S 47°10′48″E

Physical characteristics
- Source: Tsaratanana Massif
  - location: Sofia, Madagascar
  - elevation: 1,784 m (5,853 ft)
- Mouth
  - location: near Port Bergé, Sofia Indian Ocean
  - elevation: 0 m
- Length: 328 km (204 mi)
- Basin size: 29,267 km^{2} (11,300 sq mi)
- Discharge
  - location: Sofia Delta
  - average: (Period: 1971–2000)1,061.9 m^{3}/s (37,500 cu ft/s)

Basin features
- River system: Sofia River

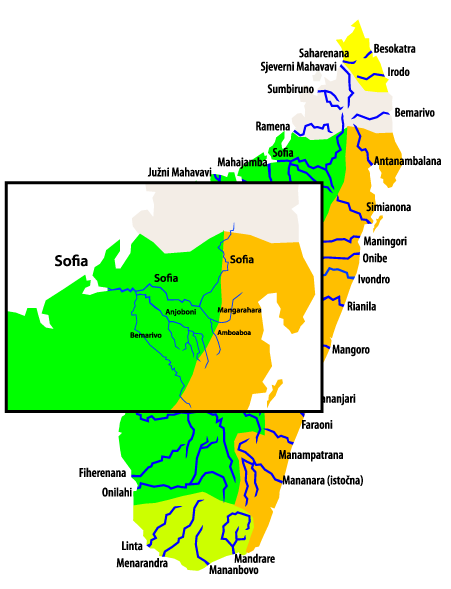
Rijeka sofia.png

The Sofia is a river of northwestern Madagascar. It flows through the Sofia Region. The source is at the Tsaratanana Massif at an altitude of 1784 metres. It has a length of 328 kilometres (204 mi).

Its mouth is in the Indian Ocean in the Boriziny-Vaovao District (Port-Bergé).
