= Nosiarina =

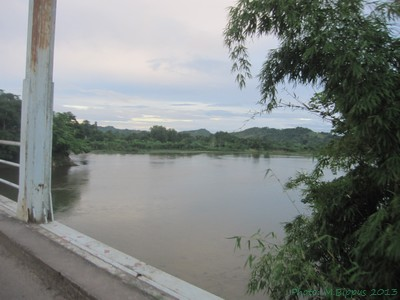
- Bemarivo River near Nosiarina

- Location in Madagascar
- Coordinates: 14°13′S 50°3′E
- Country: Madagascar
- Region: Sava
- District: Sambava

Population (2001)
  - Total: 12,000
- Time zone: UTC3 (EAT)
- Postal code: 208

Nosiarina is a rural municipality in northern Madagascar. It belongs to the district of Sambava, which is a part of Sava Region. It is situated at the Bemarivo River and the Route Nationale 5a between Sambava and Vohemar.

The population of the Nosiarina was estimated to be approximately 12,000 in 2001.

Nosiarina is situated on the Bemarivo River and the RN 5a at a distance of 17 km north of Sambava.

Primary and junior level secondary education are available in town. The majority 99% of the population of the commune are farmers. The most important crops are rice and vanilla, while other important agricultural products are banana and coffee. Services provide employment for 1% of the population.
