= Tsarabaria =

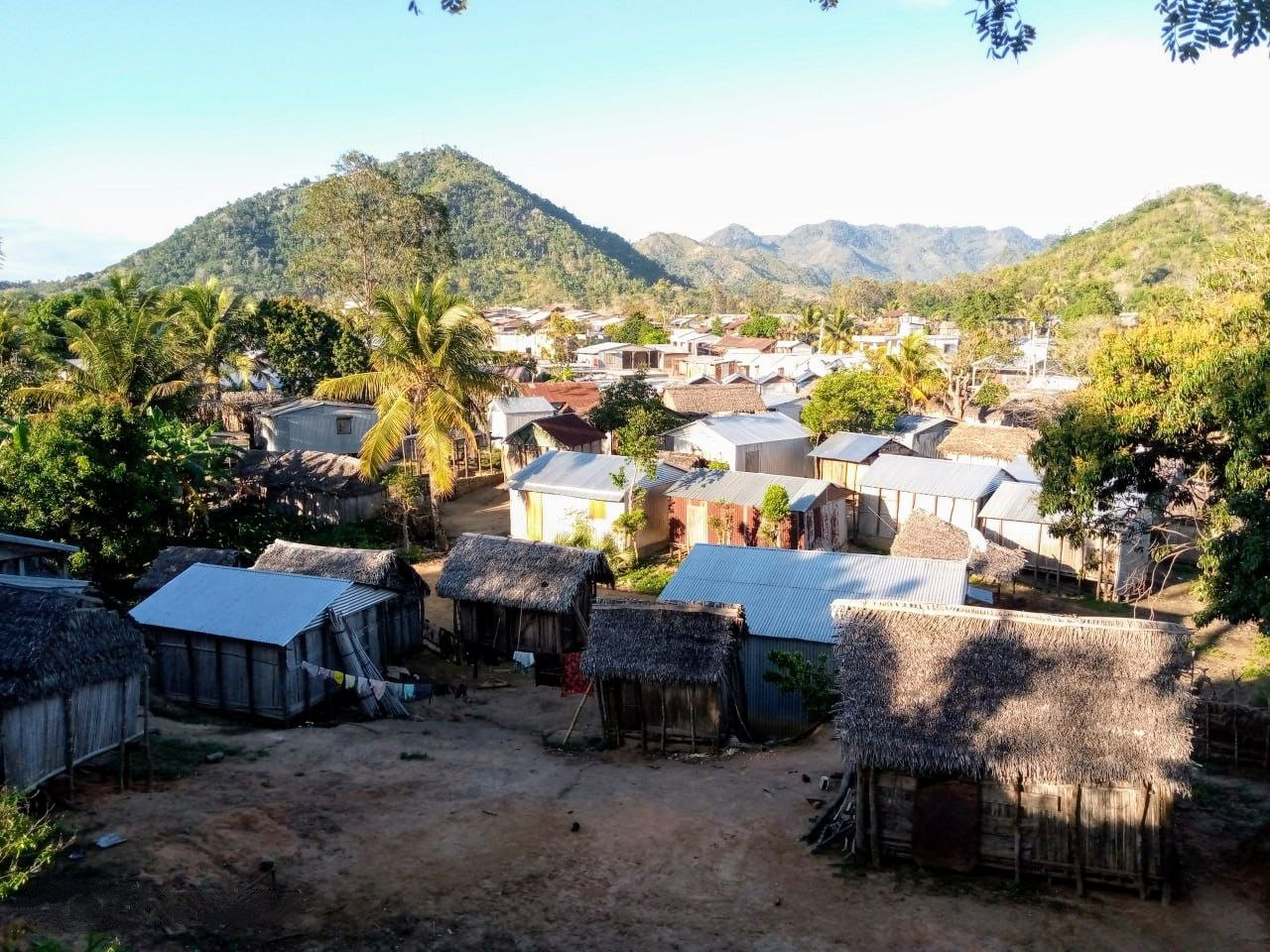

- Location in Madagascar
- Coordinates: 13°45′S 49°57′E
- Country: Madagascar
- Region: Sava
- District: Vohemar
- Elevation: 39 m (128 ft)

Population (2001)
  - Total: 20,000
- Time zone: UTC3 (EAT)

Tsarabaria is a rural municipality in northern Madagascar. It belongs to the district of Vohemar, which is a part of Sava Region. The population of the commune was estimated to be approximately 20,000 in 2001 commune census.

Primary and junior level secondary education are available. It is also a site of industrial-scale mining. The majority 99% of the population of the commune are farmers. The most important crops are coffee and vanilla, while other important agricultural products are beans and rice. Industry provides employment for 0.9% of the population. Additionally fishing employs 0.1% of the population.

== Geography ==
The town is situated at the Route nationale 5a between Vohemar and Sambava.
