= Antsahavaribe =

Antsahavaribe may mean either of the two communes in Sava Region, Madagascar:

- Antsahavaribe, Sambava in Sambava District.
- Antsahavaribe, Vohemar in Vohemar District.
