= Ampanefena =

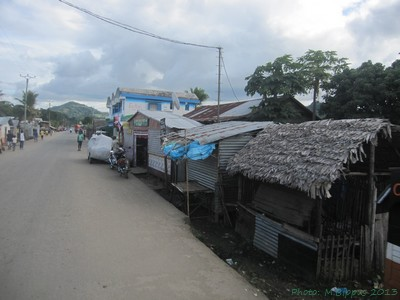

- Location in Madagascar
- Coordinates: 13°52′S 49°58′E
- Country: Madagascar
- Region: Sava
- District: Vohemar
- Elevation: 58 m (190 ft)

Population (2008)
  - Total: 13,000
- Time zone: UTC3 (EAT)
- Postal code: 209

Ampanefena is a town and commune (Malagasy: kaominina) in northern Madagascar. It belongs to the district of Vohemar, which is a part of Sava Region. In 2008 its population was estimated to 23.000.

Primary and junior level secondary education are available in town. The majority 98% of the population of the commune are farmers, while an additional 1% receives their livelihood from raising livestock. The most important crop is vanilla, while other important products are coffee and rice. Industry and services provide both employment for 0.5% of the population.

== Geography ==
The town is situated at the Route nationale 5a, halfway between Vohemar (72 km) and Sambava (74 km).

== Known persons ==
- Paul Marius Fontaine, 1963, singer, (known as Fenoamby)
