= Antsirabe Nord =

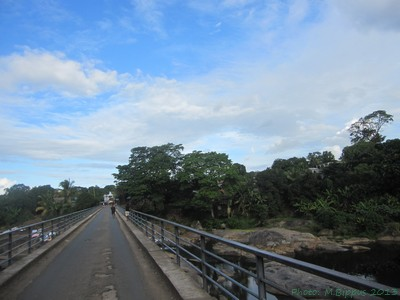

- Location in Madagascar
- Coordinates: 13°58′S 49°58′E
- Country: Madagascar
- Region: Sava
- District: Vohemar
- Elevation: 68 m (223 ft)

Population (2001)
  - Total: 25,000
- Time zone: UTC3 (EAT)
- Postal code: 209

Antsirabe Nord or Antsirabe Avaratra is a rural municipality in northern Madagascar. It belongs to the district of Vohemar, which is a part of Sava Region. The population of the commune was estimated to be approximately 25,000 in 2001 commune census.

Primary and junior level secondary education are available. The majority 99% of the population of the commune are farmers. The most important crop is vanilla, while other important products are coffee, pepper and rice. Services provide employment for 1% of the population.

== Geography ==
This municipality is situated on the National Road 5a between Vohemar and Sambava.
