= Maromokotra =

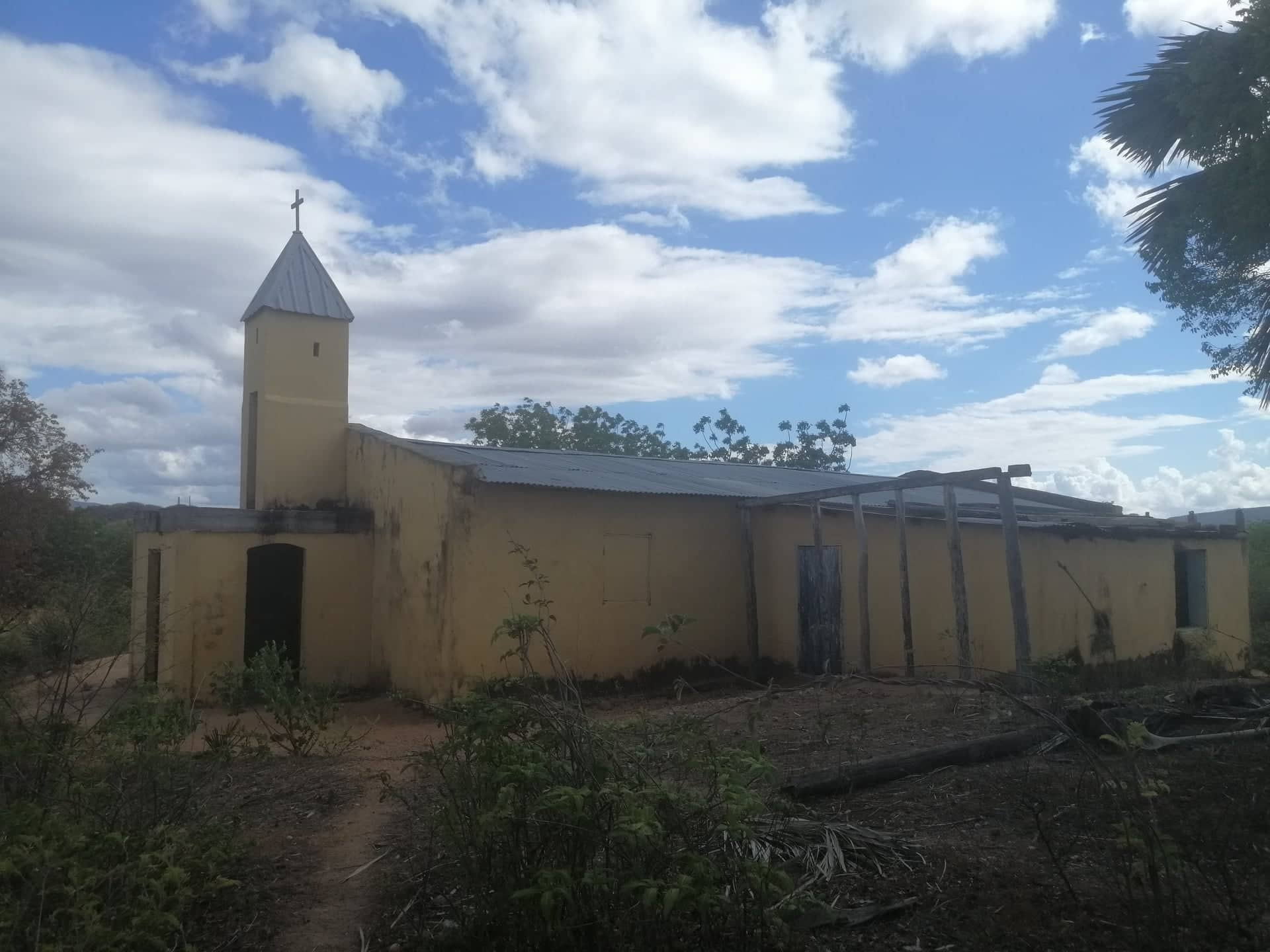
- A protestant church in Antanananabo, a village of the municipality of Maromokotra

- Location in Madagascar
- Coordinates: 12°57′S 49°34′E
- Country: Madagascar
- Region: Sava
- District: Vohemar
- Elevation: 172 m (564 ft)

Population (2001)
  - Total: 4,000
- Time zone: UTC3 (EAT)
- Postal code: 209

Maromokotra is a rural municipality in northern Madagascar. It is situated at the unpaved Route nationale 5a halfway between Ambilobe (80km) and Daraina, near the Saharenana River. It belongs to the district of Vohemar, which is a part of the Sava Region. The population of the municipality was estimated to be approximately 4,000 in the 2001 commune census.

Only primary schooling is available. The majority (94%) of the population of the commune are farmers. The most important crop is rice, while other important products are banana, maize and seeds of catechu. Services provide employment for 1% of the population, and fishing employs the remaining 5% of the population.
