= Belambo =

Belambo may refer to one of the following locations in Madagascar:

- Belambo, Ambatolampy in Ambatolampy District, Vakinankaratra Region.
- Belambo, Vohemar in Vohemar District, Sava Region.
