= Fanambana =

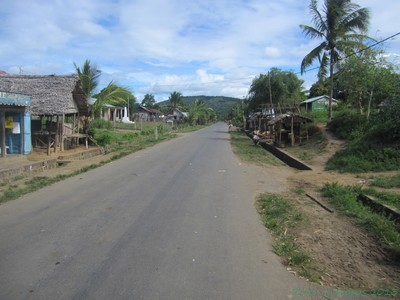

- Location in Madagascar
- Coordinates: 13°33′S 49°59′E
- Country: Madagascar
- Region: Sava
- District: Vohemar
- Elevation: 23 m (75 ft)

Population (2001)
  - Total: 12,000
- Time zone: UTC3 (EAT)

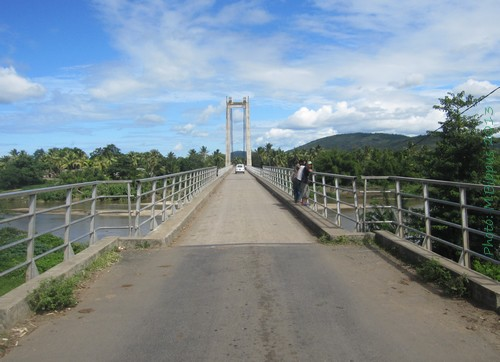
Fanambana Bridge

Fanambana is a town and commune (Malagasy: kaominina) in northern Madagascar. It belongs to the district of Vohemar, which is a part of Sava Region.

== Geography ==
The town is situated at the Fanambana River and the Route nationale 5a between Vohemar and Sambava.

The population of the commune was estimated to be approximately 12,000 as of the 2001 commune census.

Primary and junior level secondary education are available. The majority 84% of the population of the commune are farmers, while an additional 10% receive their livelihood from raising livestock. The most important crops are rice and vanilla, while other important agricultural products include coffee and beans. Services provide employment for 1% of the population. Additionally, fishing employs 5% of the population.
