= Bemarivo River =

River in Madagascar

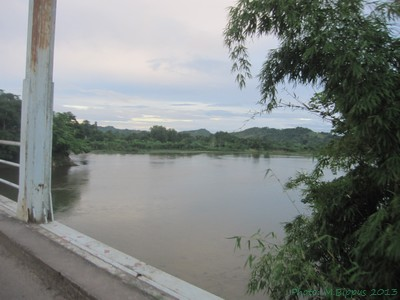
- Bemarivo river from Route Nationale 5a

- Map of Malagasy rivers (Bemarivo flows from the central-northern part to the eastern coast).

Location
- Country: Madagascar
- Region: Sava
- Cities: Nosiarina, Ambinanybe, Antafiamazava

Physical characteristics
- Source
  - location: Mount Biempoko
  - elevation: 2,219 m (7,280 ft)
- Mouth
  - location: Indian Ocean
  - coordinates: 14°08′45″S 50°09′19″E
- Length: 140 km (87 mi)
- Basin size: 4,833.6 km^{2} (1,866.3 mi^{2}) to 5,400 km^{2} (2,100 mi^{2})
- Discharge
  - location: Near mouth
  - average: (Period: 1971–2000)176.3 m^{3}/s (6,230 cu ft/s)

Basin features
- River system: Bemarivo River
- Tributaries
  - right: Androranga, Marerano, Anjialava

The Bemarivo River (/be.mari.v/), literally the big shallow, is located in northern Madagascar. It drains to the north-eastern coast, into the Indian Ocean. It drains the eastern part of the Tsaratanana Massif and the northern half of the Marojejy Massif.

It is crossed by the RN 5a near Nosiarina. Its mouth is situated 17 km north of Sambava.

It serves as the northern edge of the territory known as Betsimisaraka. Confusingly, a tributary of the Sofia River is also called the Bemarivo River (Sofia).
