= Route nationale 3b (Madagascar) =

Road in Madagascar

Location
- Country: Madagascar

Highway system
- Roads in Madagascar

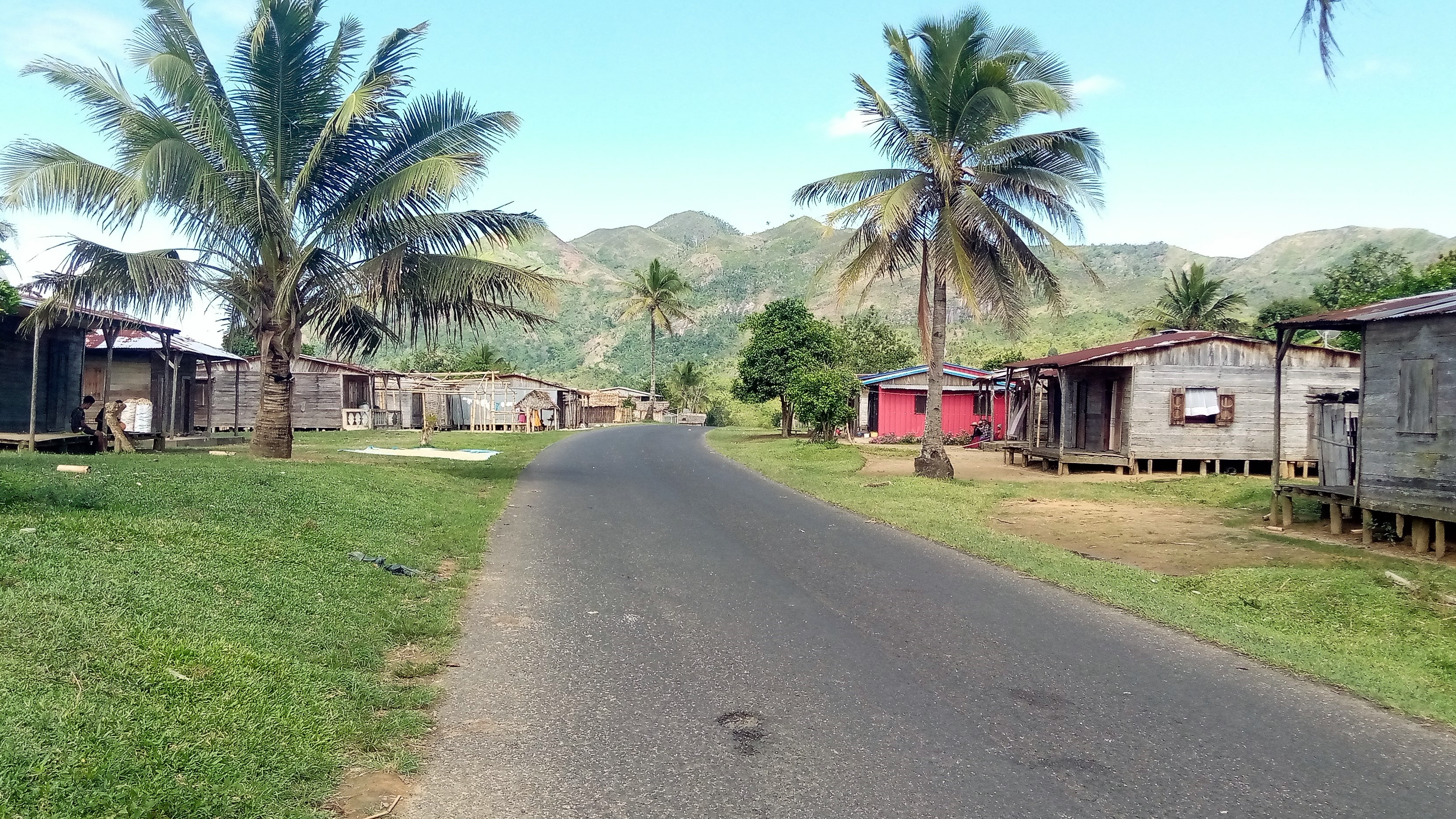
RN 3b at Maevatanana

Route nationale 3b (RN 3b) is a secondary highway in Madagascar of 106 km, running from Sambava to Andapa. It crosses the region of Sava.

== Selected locations on route ==
(west to east)

- Andapa
- Tanambo
- Ambatobarika
- Sambava (intersection with RN 5a to Ambilobe and Antalaha)

== See also ==
- List of roads in Madagascar
- Transport in Madagascar
