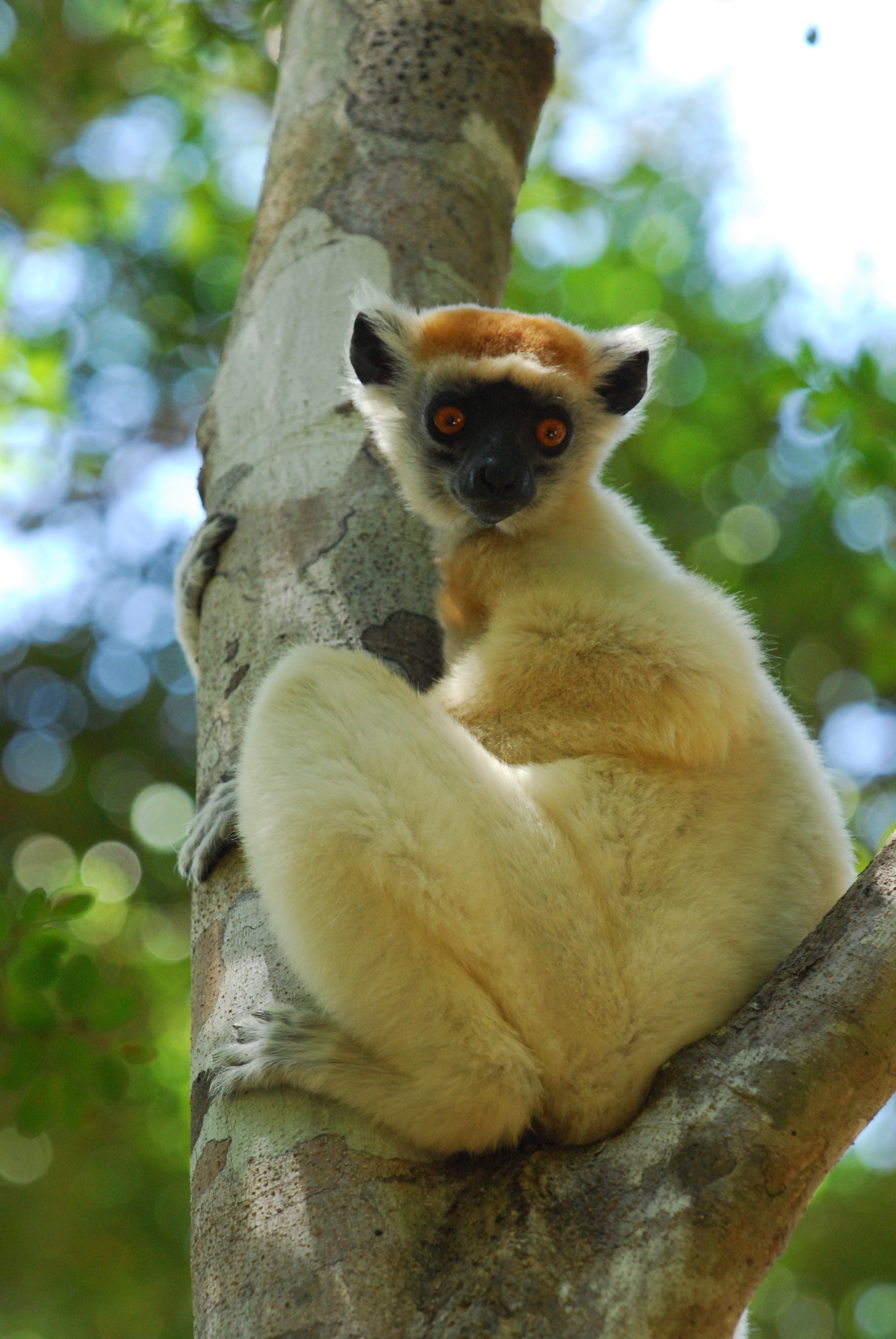

Conservation status
- Critically Endangered (IUCN 3.1)
- CITES Appendix I

Scientific classification
- Kingdom: Animalia
- Phylum: Chordata
- Class: Mammalia
- Order: Primates
- Suborder: Strepsirrhini
- Family: Indriidae
- Genus: Propithecus
- Species: P. tattersalli

Binomial name
- Propithecus tattersalli Simons, 1988
- Distribution of P. tattersalli

= Golden-crowned sifaka =

Species of lemur

The golden-crowned sifaka or Tattersall's sifaka (Propithecus tattersalli) is a medium-sized lemur characterized by mostly white fur, prominent furry ears, and a golden-orange crown. It is one of the smallest sifakas (genus Propithecus), weighing around 3.5 kg (7.7 lb) and measuring approximately 90 cm (35 in) from head to tail. Like all sifakas, it is a vertical clinger and leaper, and its diet includes mostly seeds and leaves. The golden-crowned sifaka is named after its discoverer, Ian Tattersall, who first spotted the species in 1974. However, it was not formally described until 1988, after a research team led by Elwyn L. Simons observed and captured some specimens for captive breeding. The golden-crowned sifaka most closely resembles the western forest sifakas of the P. verreauxi group, yet its karyotype suggests a closer relationship with the P. diadema group of eastern forest sifakas. Despite the similarities with both groups, more recent studies of its karyotype support its classification as a distinct species.

Found in gallery, deciduous, and semi-evergreen forest, its restricted range includes 44 forest fragments, totaling an area of 44,125 hectares (109,040 acres; 170.37 sq mi), centered on the town of Daraina in northeast Madagascar. Its estimated population is between 4,000 and 5,000 individuals. It is primarily active during the day, although it also tends to be active at dawn and dusk during the rainy season. It sleeps in tall emergent trees and is preyed upon by the fossa. The golden-crowned sifaka lives in groups of around five to six individuals, containing a balanced number of adult males and females. Scent is used to mark territories, which are defended by growling, chasing, and ritualistic leaping displays. Reproduction is seasonal, with gestation lasting six months and lactation lasting five months. Infants are weaned during the wet season to ensure the best chances of survival.

The small range and fragmented populations of this species weigh heavily on its survival. Forest fragmentation, habitat destruction, poaching, slash-and-burn agriculture, and other human factors threaten its existence. The golden-crowned sifaka is listed by the IUCN Red List as Critically Endangered. Its range was originally not covered by any national parks or protected areas in Madagascar, but a new protected area, Loky-Manambato reserve, was established in 2005 to include a 20,000 ha (49,000 acres; 77 sq mi) portion. Attempts have been made to keep the golden-crowned sifaka in captivity at the Duke Lemur Center in Durham, North Carolina. The small colony was maintained from 1988 to 2008. In Madagascar, lawlessness resulting from the 2009 political coup led to increased poaching of this species, and many were sold to local restaurants as a delicacy.

== Taxonomy and phylogeny ==
The golden-crowned or Tattersall's sifaka (Propithecus tattersalli), known locally as ankomba malandy (or akomba malandy, meaning "white lemur"), was discovered in 1974 north of Vohemar in northeast Madagascar by Ian Tattersall, who observed but did not capture the animal. Unsure of its classification, Tattersall provisionally considered it a variant of the silky sifaka in his 1982 book, The Primates of Madagascar, citing its mostly off-white to yellowish fur, but also noting its uncharacteristic orange crown patch and tufted ears. Driven by a report in 1986 that the forest where Tattersall had observed this unique sifaka was contracted to be clear-cut for charcoal production, a research team from the Duke Lemur Center, led by Elwyn L. Simons, obtained permits to capture specimens for a captive breeding program. Simons and his team were the first to capture and observe the golden-crowned sifaka, formally describing it as a new species in 1988 and naming it in honor of Tattersall. The specimens were found 6 to 7 km (3.7 to 4.3 mi) northeast of Daraina, a village in the northeast corner of Madagascar.

There have been conflicting studies regarding the taxonomic status of the golden-crowned sifaka. When described by Simons in 1988, size, vocalizations, and karyotypes (the number and appearance of chromosomes) were compared with the other sifakas. In terms of size, general morphology, and vocalizations, the golden-crowned sifaka is more comparable to the western forest sifakas (known as the P. verreauxi group) in that it is smaller in length and weight. Its karyotype, however, is more similar to that of the eastern forest sifakas (known as the P. diadema group). The golden-crowned sifaka has 42 chromosomes (2n=42), 16 of which are autosomal pairs (not sex chromosomes) that are meta- or submetacentric (where chromosome arms are equal or unequal in length, respectively). The remaining autosomal pairs are smaller and acrocentric (with the shorter chromosome arm difficult to observe). Its X chromosome is metacentric, which is comparable to that of the P. diadema group, not the P. verreauxi group. Given the conflicting information, its geographic isolation, as well as the unique long fur tufts on the ears—a trait not shared by any other sifaka—the golden-crowned sifaka was recognized as a distinct species.

In 1997, comparisons of repeated DNA sequences within the family Indriidae supported Simon's classification, placing the golden-crowned sifaka as a sister group to the other sifakas. In 2001, a study involving mitochondrial DNA suggested a very recent divergence between it and the Coquerel's sifaka, then considered a subspecies of the P. verreauxi group. If this were true, the golden-crowned sifaka would not merit species status and would form a subclade with the Coquerel's sifaka within the P. verreauxi group. In 2004, a comparative study of the karyotypes of the three traditional species of sifakas provided insight into the chromosomal arrangements of all three groups. This study found that the golden-crowned sifaka differs from P. verreauxi group and P. diadema group by 9 and 17 chromosomal rearrangements respectively, and conversely argued that the golden-crowned sifaka is indeed a separate species and is more closely related to the P. verreauxi group. More recently, in 2007 a craniodental (skull and tooth) study provided evidence for 9 or 10 distinct sifaka species, including the golden-crowned sifaka. It also placed the golden-crowned sifaka within the P. verreauxi group.

== Anatomy and physiology ==
The golden-crowned sifaka is one of the smallest sifaka species with a weight of 3.4 to 3.6 kg (7.5 to 7.9 lb), a head-body length of 45 to 47 cm (18 to 19 in), a tail length of 42 to 47 cm (17 to 19 in), and total length of 87 to 94 cm (34 to 37 in). It is comparable in size to the sifakas inhabiting the southern and western dry forests, such as Coquerel's sifaka, the crowned sifaka, Von der Decken's sifaka, and Verreaux's sifaka. It has a coat of moderately long, creamy-white fur with a golden tint, dark black or chocolate-brown fur on its neck and throat, pale orange fur on the tops of its legs and forelimbs, a white tail and hindlimbs, and a characteristic bright orange-gold crown. It is the only sifaka with prominent tufts of white fur protruding from its ears, making its head appear somewhat triangular and distinctive in appearance. Its eyes are orange, and its face is black and mostly hairless, with dark gray-black fur with white hairs stretching from beneath the eyes to the cheeks. Its snout is blunt and rounded, and its broad nose helps to distinguish it from other sifakas. Occasionally the bridge of the nose will have a patch of white fur. Similar to other sifakas, this arboreal animal has long, strong legs that enable it to cling and leap between tree trunks and branches.

== Geographic range and habitat ==
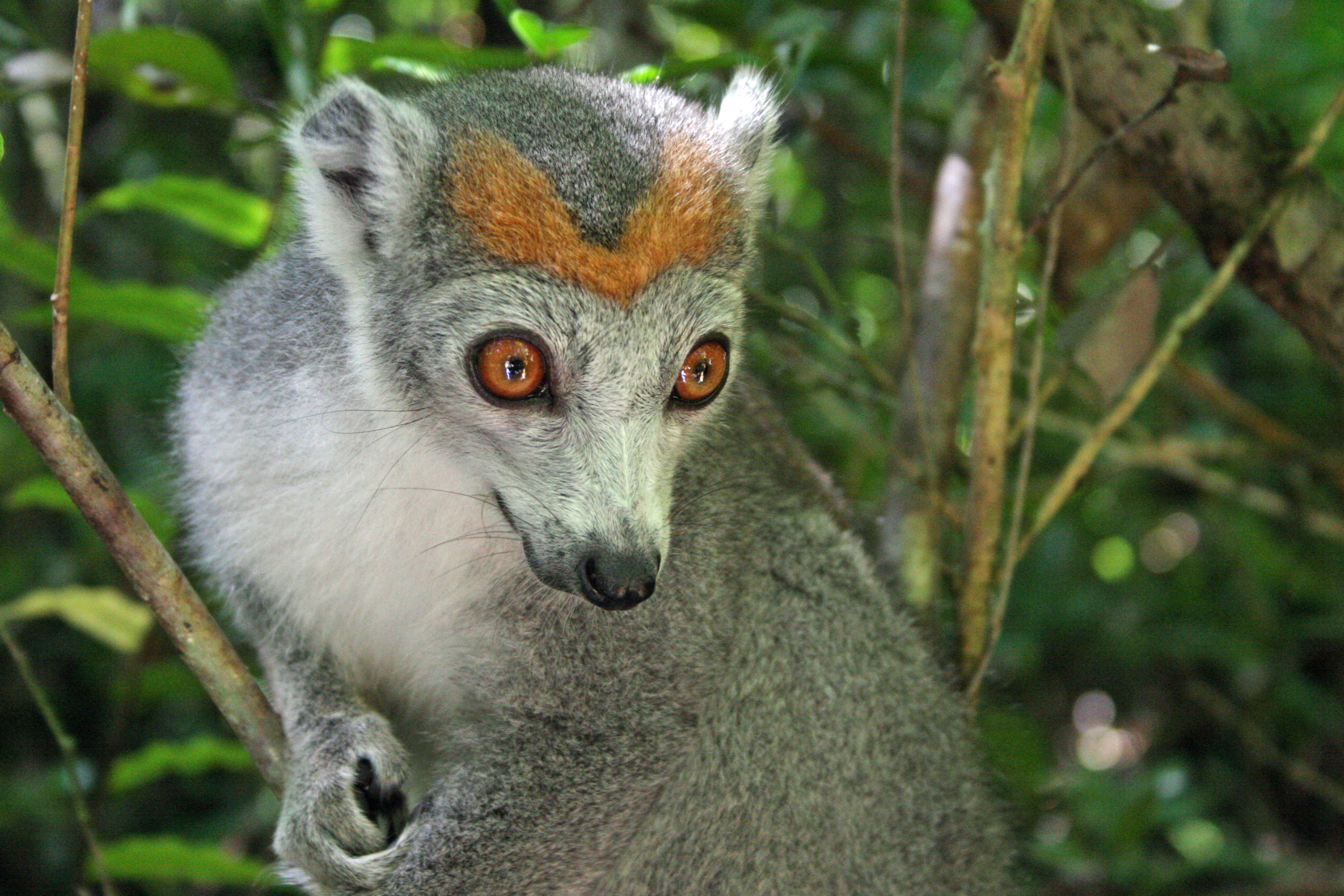
The geographic range of the crowned lemur overlaps the range of the golden-crowned sifaka.

The golden-crowned sifaka lives in dry deciduous, gallery, and semi-evergreen forests and is found at altitudes up to 500 m (1,640 ft), though it seems to prefer lower elevations. Surveys have shown it to be limited to highly fragmented forests surrounding the town of Daraina in an area encircled by the Manambato and Loky Rivers in northeastern Madagascar. The golden-crowned sifaka has one of the smallest geographic ranges of all indriid lemur species. Out of 75 forest fragments studied by researchers, its presence could be definitively reported in only 44, totaling 44,125 ha (109,040 acres; 170.37 sq mi). This study, published in 2002, also estimated the total species population and observed population densities. Home range size varied between 0.18 and 0.29 km^{2} (0.069 and 0.112 sq mi) per group. With an average group size of five individuals, the population density ranged between 17 and 28 individuals per km^{2}. Another home range size estimate of 0.09 to 0.12 km^{2} (0.035 to 0.046 sq mi) has also been suggested with a population density range of 10 and 23 individuals per km^{2}. The forested area available to the species within its desired elevation range was estimated at 360 km^{2} (140 sq mi), yielding an estimated population of 6,120–10,080 and a breeding population between 2,520 and 3,960 individuals. However, a study published in 2010 using line transect data from 2006 and 2008 in five major forest fragments yielded an estimated population of 18,000 individuals.

The species is sympatric (coexists) with two other medium-sized lemurs: the Sanford's brown lemur (Eulemur sanfordii) and the crowned lemur (Eulemur coronatus).

== Behavior ==
The golden-crowned sifaka is primarily active during the day (diurnal), but researchers have witnessed activity in the early morning and evening (crepuscular) during the rainy season (November through April). In captivity, it has been observed feeding at night, unlike captive Verreaux's sifakas. It travels between 461.7 and 1,077 m (1,515 and 3,533 ft) per day, an intermediate range compared to other sifakas of the eastern forests. The golden-crowned sifaka can be observed feeding and resting higher in the canopy during the dry season (May through October). It sleeps in the taller trees (the emergent layer) of the forest at night.

When stressed, the golden-crowned sifaka emits grunting vocalizations as well as repeated "churrs" that escalate into a high-amplitude "whinney." Its ground predator alarm call, which sounds like "shē-fäk", closely resembles that of Verreaux's sifaka. It also emits mobbing alarm calls in response to birds of prey.

=== Diet ===
The diet of the golden-crowned sifaka consists of a wide variety of plants—as many as 80 species—whose availability varies based on the season. It is a seed predator, making seeds a year-round staple in its diet when available. The golden-crowned sifaka also eats unripe fruits, flowers, and leaves. One study showed a diet composition of 37% unripe fruit and seeds, 22% immature leaves, 17% mature leaves, 13% flowers, and 9% fruit pulp. Individuals have also been observed consuming tree bark during the dry season. In general, approximately 60% of its diet consists of unripe fruits and seed, mainly from leguminous pods, and less than 50% consists of leaves. At Daraina, it has been observed feeding on the sakoa tree (Poupartia caffra) and on mango trees. Immature leaves and flowers are eaten when available, in the early wet season. Daily traveling distance tends to increase when immature leaves are available. Studies have also shown that when food distribution is patchy, feeding times are shorter and more time is spent traveling. Dietary diversity has been shown to be consistent between populations, suggesting that it is important for the lemur to get a varied mix of nutrients and to protect itself from high levels of specific plant toxins.

A study in 1993 showed variability and flexibility in feeding preferences between three research sites around Daraina. Plant species preferences (measured in feeding time) changed between wetter, intermediate, and drier forests:

Plant species preferences near Daraina
	Wetter sites	Intermediate sites	Driest sites
Favored plant families	Fabaceae; Sapindaceae; Anacardiaceae; Myrtaceae; Annonaceae	Fabaceae; Anacardiaceae; Olacaceae; Araliaceae; Malvaceae	Fabaceae; Sapindaceae; Anacardiaceae; Ebenaceae; Combretaceae
Favored plant species	Cynometra sp. (Fabaceae); Filicium longifolium (Sapindaceae); Eugenia sp. (Myrtaceae); Cordyla madagascariensis (Fabaceae); Xylopia flexuosa (Annonaceae)	Cynometra sp. (Fabaceae); Baudouinia fluggeiformis (Fabaceae); Albizia boivini (Fabaceae); Pongamiopsis sp. (Fabaceae); Olax lanceolata (Olacaceae)	Pongamiopsis cloiselli (Fabaceae); Diospyros lokohensis (Ebenaceae); Terminalia sp. 1 (Combretaceae); Erythrophysa belini (Sapindaceae); Tamarindus indica (Fabaceae)

=== Social organization ===
The social structure of the golden-crowned sifaka is very similar to that of Verreaux's sifaka, both averaging between five and six individuals per group, with a range between three and ten. Unlike the Verreaux's sifaka, group sex ratios are more evenly balanced, consisting of two or more members of both sexes. Females are dominant within the group, and only one female breeds successfully each season. Males will roam between groups during the mating season.

Because of their smaller home ranges relative to other sifakas, group encounters are slightly more common, occurring a few times a month. It has been noted that the temperament of the golden-crowned sifaka is more volatile than that of other sifaka species and, in the case of a dispute, this animal frequently emits a grunt-like vocalization that seems to signal annoyance. Aggressive interactions between groups are generally non-physical but include loud growling, territorial marking, chasing, and ritualistic leaping displays. Same-sexed individuals act most aggressively towards each other during such encounters. Scent marking is the most common form of territorial defense, with scent marks acting as "signposts" to demarcate territorial boundaries. Females use glands in the genital regions ("anogenital") while males use both anogenital and chest glands.

=== Reproduction ===
The golden-crowned sifaka is a seasonal breeder, often mating during the last week of January. Its gestation period is a little less than six months, and its lactation period is five months. Research has indicated that reproduction is strategically linked with forest seasonality. Gestation starts in the later part of the wet season (late January), and continues for approximately 170 days. Parturition occurs in the middle of the dry season (late June or July). Weaning occurs during the middle of the wet season, in December, when an abundance of immature leaves is available. It is thought that such reproductive timing exists to ensure adequate protein intake from the immature leaves for both mother and child at the end of the lactation period.

Females reproduce once every two years. Infants are born with little hair and initially cling to their mother's belly. As they mature, they begin to ride on her back. Following weaning, riding on the back is only tolerated for short durations, particularly when the group is alerted to the presence of a predator. By one year of age, the juveniles are 70% of their full adult body weight. Infant mortality is high in this species. Upon reaching sexual maturity, males leave their natal group and transfer to neighboring social groups. Observations by researchers and reports from local people indicate that this species will jump to the ground and cross more than 200 m (660 ft) of grassland to reach nearby forest patches. This suggests that forest fragmentation may not completely isolate separated populations.

== Predators and parasites ==
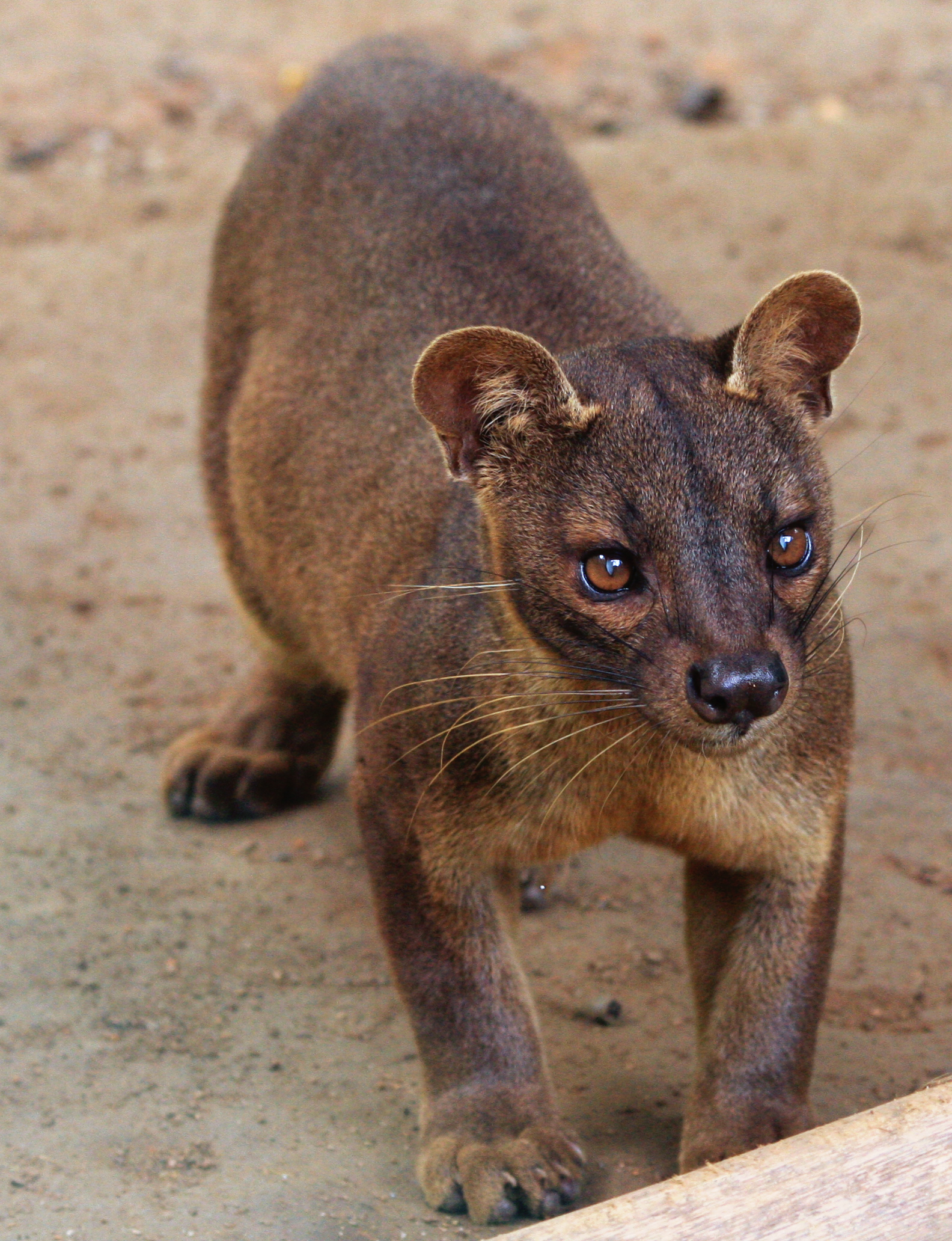
The fossa is a predator of the golden-crowned sifaka.

The only predator known to target this species is the fossa, although the golden-crowned sifaka reacts to the presence of birds of prey with alarm calls. A hematology and serum chemistry study published in 1995 revealed that 59% of the wild golden-crowned sifakas sampled were infected with a microfilarial parasite, a potentially unknown species of nematode in the genus Mansonella. Healthy, infected individuals did not appear to be adversely affected by the infestation, but the overall effect on the dwindling population is unknown. Also, no malarial or intestinal parasites were found, although 48% of the golden-crowned sifakas examined had external ear mites.

== Human interactions ==
While the golden-crowned sifaka faces few biological threats, such as predation, it faces many significant human-caused (anthropogenic) threats. Its habitat has been highly fragmented, with forest patches isolated by severely degraded grasslands. By 1985 it was estimated that 34% of the entire eastern rainforest of the island had disappeared, and by extrapolation it is predicted that at this rate of deforestation there will be no eastern rainforest left by 2020. Illegal logging practices, slash-and-burn agriculture (known as tavy), uncontrolled grass fires, gold mining, poaching, and clearing land for agricultural use have all significantly contributed to the significant deforestation witnessed in Madagascar and the ongoing decline of suitable habitat for this species.

Malagasy farmers continue to use fire to clear out agricultural land and pasture for livestock, promoting grass growth while inhibiting forest regeneration. The fires sometimes burn out of control and destroy forest edges along with the natural flora, increasing the damage even further than intended. Due to the nature of Madagascar's geology and soil, tavy also depletes the fertility of the soil, accelerating the crop rotation rate and necessitating expansion into primary forests.

Although coal is the preferred cooking fuel of the Malagasy people, the most affordable and prominent source of energy is timber, known as kitay. Wood is also used as a primary building material, only adding further incentive to remove trees from the forest. With the depletion of dead wood from the forest patches, the people have begun to remove young, healthy trees. This is seen most commonly in areas closest to villages. Although the shapes and sizes of forest fragments around the Daraina region have been mostly stable for 50 years prior to a study in 2002, the six years preceding the study had seen 5% of the small- to medium-sized forest fragments disappear due to increased human encroachment.

A newly emergent threat facing the golden-crowned sifaka is hunting by the gold miners moving into the region's forests. Although mining operations are small scale, the practice of gold mining takes a toll on the forested regions because deep mining pits are often dug near or underneath large trees, disturbing the extensive root systems and ultimately killing the trees in the area. The influx of gold miners has also increased poaching pressure. Although the species is protected from hunting by local fady (taboo) around Daraina, due to their likeness to humans, and by Malagasy law, the gold miners who have immigrated to the area have begun to hunt the golden-crowned sifaka as a source of bushmeat. In 1993, David M. Meyers, a researcher who has studied the golden-crowned sifaka, speculated that if bushmeat hunting were to escalate, the species would go extinct in less than ten years since it is easy to find and not fearful of humans. Indeed, bushmeat hunting by people from nearby Ambilobe has already extirpated at least one isolated population.

=== Conservation ===
Because studies have shown that the golden-crowned sifaka are most likely to be found in large forest fragments (greater than 1,000 ha (2,500 acres; 3.9 sq mi)), the species is thought to be sensitive to forest fragmentation and degradation. However, since it has been found around gold mining camps and degraded forests, it is not restricted to undisturbed forests and appears to tolerate human activity. Regardless, with its low population, highly restricted range, and badly fragmented habitat, the prospect for survival for the golden-crowned sifaka is considered bleak. For these reasons, the International Union for Conservation of Nature (IUCN) added it to its list of the 25 most endangered primates in 2000. Previously, in 1992, the IUCN's Species Survival Commission (IUCN/SSC) Primate Specialist Group also assigned the species its highest priority rating. As of its 2014 assessment, the golden-crowned sifaka is once again "Critically Endangered" on the IUCN Red List. This was an upgrade from 2008 when it was listed as Endangered. In previous assessments it was listed as Critically Endangered (1996 and 2000) and Endangered (1990 and 1994).

The area inhabited by the golden-crowned sifaka is also an important agricultural and economical resource for the human population. Suggested conservation action aimed at protecting this species and its habitat has focused on offering varying degrees of protection to forest fragments in the region, allowing human activity and resource extraction in areas that have less conservation potential while strictly protecting areas critical to the species' survival. In 2002, none of the forested areas that the golden-crowned sifaka inhabits were part of a formally protected national park or reserve. A conservation study from 1989 called for the creation of a national park that includes the forest of Binara as well as the dry forests to the north of Daraina. A more recent study from 2002 proposed a network of protected forest areas including areas outside of the village of Daraina, forests north of the Monambato River, and the northern forests that constitute the species' northern reservoir. In 2005, Fanamby, a Malagasy non-governmental organization (NGO), teamed up with Conservation International to create a 20,000-hectare (49,000-acre; 77 sq mi) protected area that both Association Fanamby and the Ministry of Water and Forests manage. As of 2008, only ten forest patches that could support viable populations remained, according to the IUCN.

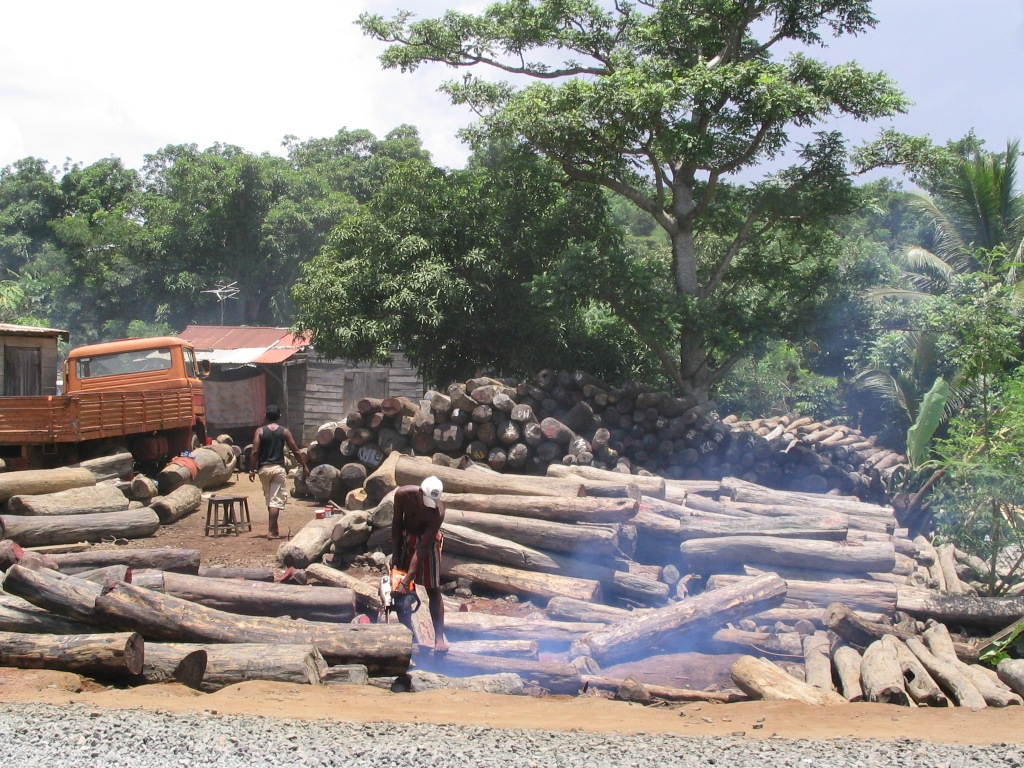
Illegal logging poses another threat to the golden-crowned sifaka.

Only one captive population of golden-crowned sifakas has been represented in a zoological collection. Building on a successful record of maintaining a viable captive Verreaux's sifaka population, the Duke Lemur Center (DLC) in Durham, North Carolina, requested and obtained permission from the government of Madagascar to capture and export this (then) unknown species for captive breeding. Plans were also made to establish a captive breeding program at the Ivoloina Forestry Station, now known as Parc Ivoloina. In November 1987, during the same expedition that resulted in the formal description of the species, two males and two females were caught and measured. Five others were also caught, but were released because they were juvenile males. In July 1988, a golden-crowned sifaka was born in captivity at the DLC. However, the captive population was small and not viable for long-term breeding, and captive sifakas have proven difficult to maintain due to their specialized dietary needs. The last captive individual died in 2008. Despite the loss of its small colony after 20 years, DLC believes that establishment of a captive population for conservation-oriented captive breeding purposes could provide an important second level of protection, particularly if habitat protection measures are unsuccessful.

=== Effects of the 2009 political crisis ===
As a result of the political crisis that began in 2009 and the resulting breakdown of law and order in Madagascar, poachers have hunted lemurs in the Daraina area and sold them to local restaurants as a delicacy. Pictures of dead lemurs that had been smoked for transport were taken by Fanamby and released by Conservation International in August 2009. The lemurs in the photographs included the endangered golden-crowned sifaka, as well as crowned lemurs. Around the time the photographs were released, 15 people were arrested for selling smoked lemurs, which were bought from hunters for 1,000 ariary, or around US$0.53, and then sold in restaurants for 8,000 ariary (US$4.20). Russell Mittermeier, president of Conservation International, said that the arrests would not end the poaching since the poachers would "just get slaps on the wrist".
