= Ankavanana =

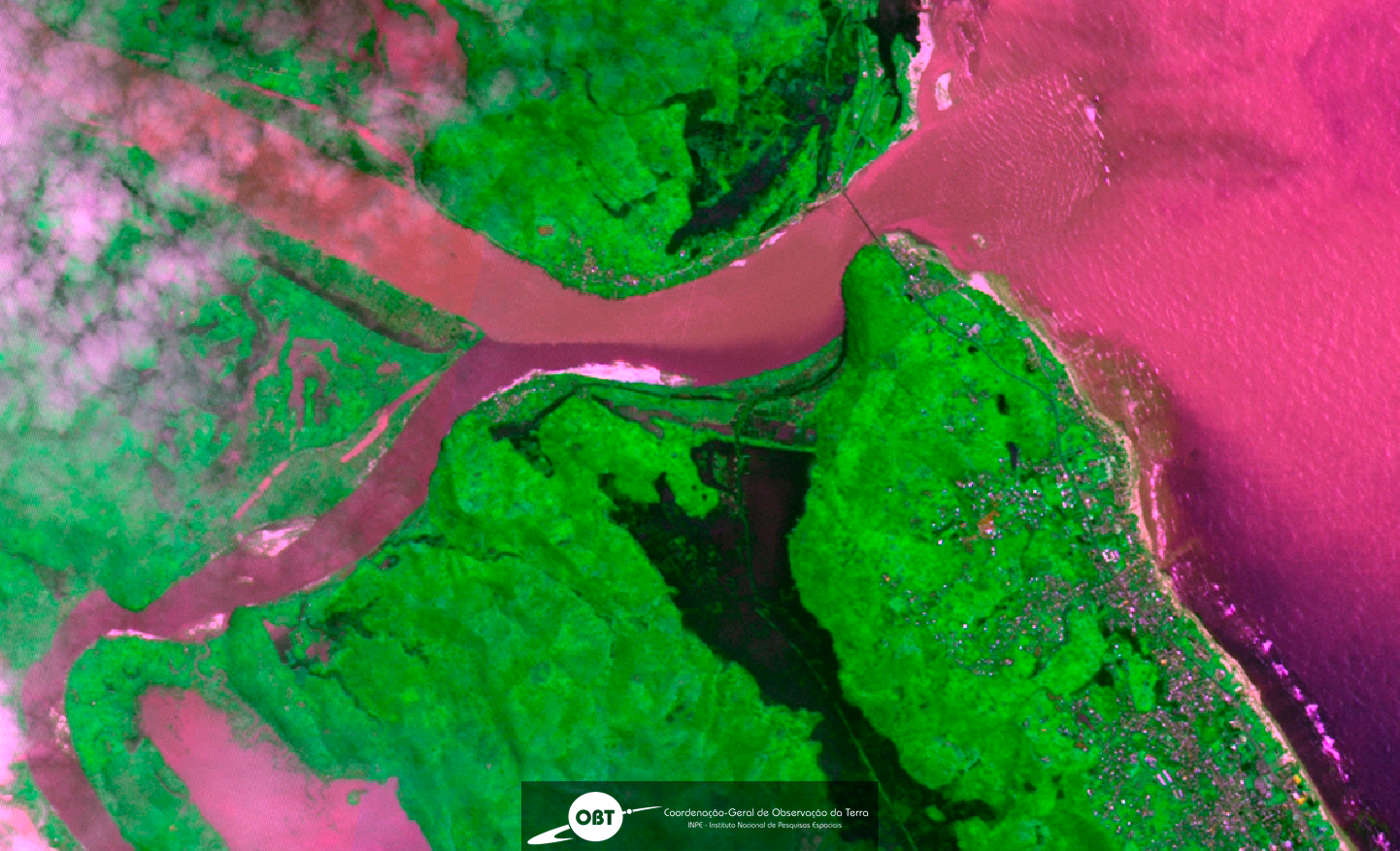

Location
- Country: Madagascar
- Region: Sava

Physical characteristics
- Source
  - location: Marojejy National Park, Sava
  - coordinates: 14°46′31″S 49°41′30″E
  - elevation: 715 m (2,346 ft)
- Mouth: Indian Ocean
  - location: Antalaha, Sava
  - coordinates: 14°52′00″S 50°15′45″E
  - elevation: 0 m (0 ft)
- Length: 125 km (78 mi)
- Basin size: 3,457.9 km^{2} (1,335.1 sq mi)
- Discharge
  - location: Near mouth
  - average: (Period: 1971–2000)143.4 m^{3}/s (5,060 cu ft/s)

Basin features
- River system: Ankavanana River
- Tributaries
  - right: Ankavia

The Ankavanana is a river located in northern Madagascar in the Sava Region. Its sources are south of Andapa, crosses the Route Nationale 5a near Antalaha and flows into the Indian Ocean.
