= Ambinanin'andravory =

- Location in Madagascar
- Coordinates: 13°46′S 49°45′E
- Country: Madagascar
- Region: Sava
- District: Vohemar
- Elevation: 183 m (600 ft)

Population (2001)
  - Total: 9,000
- Time zone: UTC3 (EAT)

Ambinanin'andravory is a town and commune (Malagasy: kaominina) in northern Madagascar. It belongs to the district of Vohemar, which is a part of Sava Region. The population of the commune was estimated to be approximately 9,000 in 2001 commune census.

Primary and junior level secondary education are available in town. The majority 99% of the population of the commune are farmers. The most important crops are rice and vanilla, while other important agricultural products are coffee and coconut. Services provide employment for 1% of the population.
