= Madagascar dwarf gecko =

Conservation status
- Vulnerable (IUCN 3.1)

Scientific classification
- Kingdom: Animalia
- Phylum: Chordata
- Class: Reptilia
- Order: Squamata
- Suborder: Gekkota
- Family: Gekkonidae
- Genus: Lygodactylus
- Species: L. madagascariensis

Binomial name
- Lygodactylus madagascariensis (Boettger, 1881)
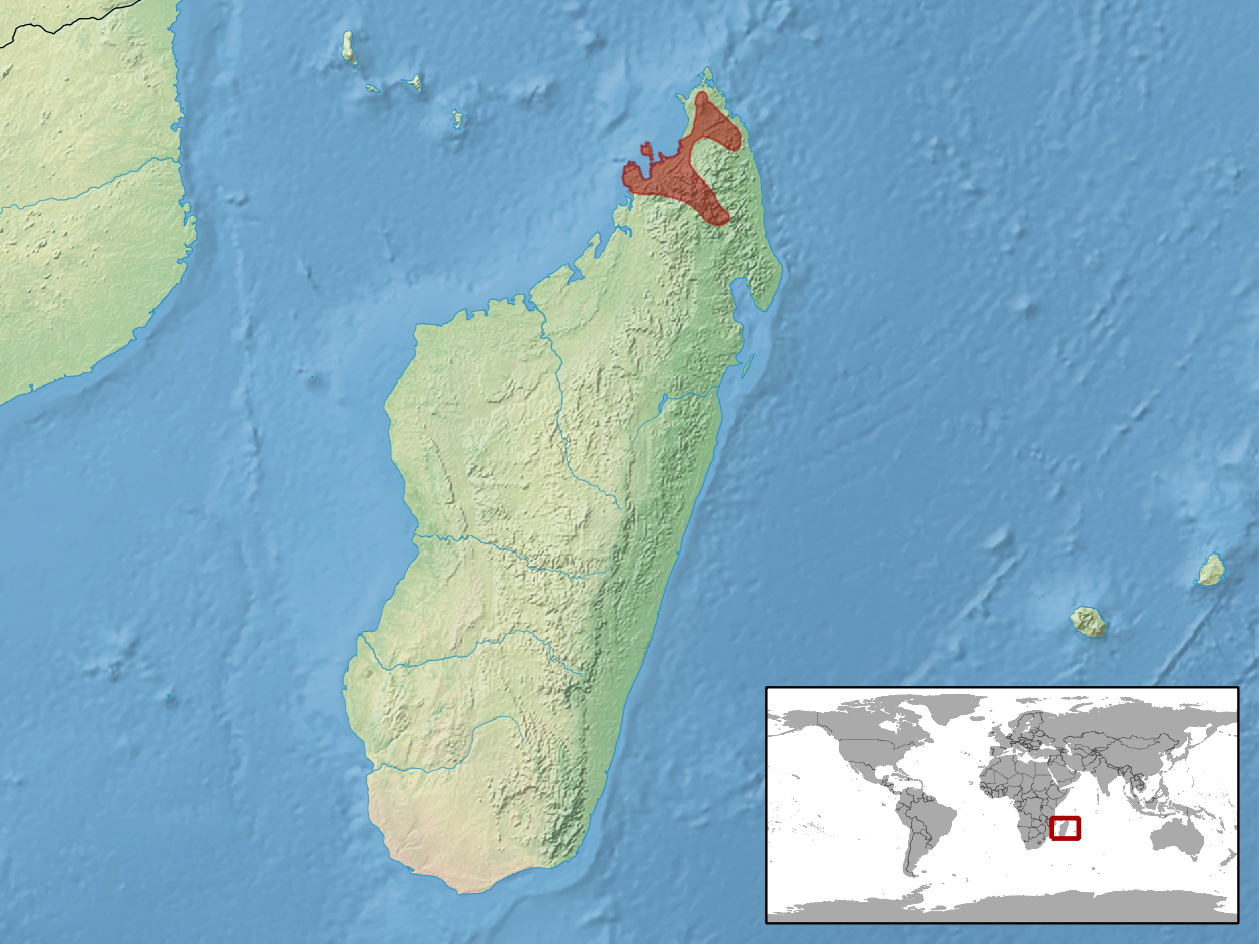

Synonyms
- Scalabotes madagascariensis

Species of lizard

The Madagascar dwarf gecko (Lygodactylus madagascariensis) is a species of gecko endemic to Madagascar.

Madagascar and its surrounding islands are home to five known species of dwarf geckos belonging to the Lygodactylus madagascariensis species group. They inhabit a range of ecosystems, including rain forests, dry forests, coastal areas, and even human-altered habitats like gardens and plantations. These geckos have evolved several adaptations to thrive in their environments. Their small size, agile bodies, and specialized toe pads enable them to climb trees and shrubs with ease. Their coloration and patterns help them blend into their surroundings, providing camouflage and protection from predators. Unlike other species of geckos, the Madagascar dwarf gecko is known to not reproduce in dry seasons of the rain forest. Their population of females decreases as seasons get dryer which leads to fewer eggs being laid. The conservation status of the Madagascar dwarf geckos is listed as Vulnerable under the International Union for Conservation of Nature Red List.

== Species description ==
The genus Lygodactylus has 71 recognized species of small, diurnal geckos. These species are found across Madagascar (22 species), continental Sub-Saharan Africa (47 species) and South America (two species). The species is relatively small (SVL 28.5–34.0 mm) and typically shows a typical coloration, with irregular beige patches forming in longitudinal rows across the brown dorsum, as well as irregular dark brown markings.

== Geographic Distribution and Range ==
Although most dwarf geckos are found in Africa, Madagascar has been hypothesized to be their geographic origin. In the Gekkonidae family, Lygodactylus forms a clade with two other genera of diurnal geckos: the southwestern African Rhoptropella and the diverse Phelsuma genus. L. madagascariensis has been well-recorded in six locations: (1) Nosy Be; (2) Manarikoba Forest on the western slope of the Tsaratanana Massif (Andampy Campsite); (3) Manongarivo; (4) Maromiandra; (5) Andrafainkona; and (6) Montagne d’Ambre. These sites are located in the Sambirano and northern regions of Madagascar.

== Habitat ==
This species’ habitat consists of Madagascar's tropical and subtropical humid forests. Its micro habitat includes leaf litter, bark and rock crevices, as well as the under story and visible parts of the canopy. Its macro habitat encompasses rain forests, dry forests, savannas, deserts, and montane environments.

== Life Cycle ==
Members of the Lygodactylus genus have a lifespan between 5 and 10 years, but they can exceed this if they're in captivity. Most species in the Gekkonidae family, as well as the subfamily Gekkoninae, lay two eggs with a calcareous shell.

== Ecology (Predators, Competitors, and Related Species) ==
The Madagascar dwarf gecko has various predators, competitors, and related species. Some of its predators include snakes, larger lizards, birds, and mammals. Furthermore, some of its competitors are other dwarf geckos (Lygodactylus spp.) and day geckos (Phelsuma spp.). They compete mostly for food sources, such as insects, fruit, and nectar, as well as for desirable land to inhabit. Moreover, Lygodactylus madagascariensis is closely related to several other dwarf gecko species within the genus Lygodactylus, particularly those in the subgenus Domerguella. Some related species in Madagascar include Lygodactylus tantsaha, Lygodactylus fritzi, and Lygodactylus petteri.

== Threats and Conservation ==
=== Habitat Loss ===
Anthropogenic activity, such as agriculture, is a predominant feature modifying the landscape and habitats in Madagascar. On both Nosy Komba and Nosy Be, the vegetation coverage has been almost completely altered by humans. Most of Nosy Komba is now made up of secondary forest, scrub, shade-grown coffee plantations, and cacao plantations, as well as mixed open plantations, featuring cassava, banana, pineapple, chili and vanilla. Currently, Nosy Komba does not receive any legal environmental protection.

Since Nosy Be is a center for agriculture and tourism, the island has a lot of roads and has been largely deforested to convert the land into coffee plantations, rice fields, ylang-ylang, and sugar cane fields, largely to produce essential oils and alcohol.

The northern part of the Tsingy de Bemaraha plateau, a protected area in the central-western part of Madagascar, is an Integral Natural Reserve that covers 85,370 ha^{2}_{.} However, even in the Integral Natural Reserve, the forests are not well-protected or surveyed. The southern forest boundary of the national park, especially areas close to humans, experience significant degradation due to the high demand for agricultural land, cattle grazing, and wood.

This habitat loss leaves Malagasy reptiles at threat of extinction. Since many of the species in the park are endemic, meaning they have very specific micro habitat requirements, they are at a disproportionate risk from forest changes.

=== Introduced Species ===
An introduced species, also called alien or foreign species, is a species living outside its native distributional range, but which has arrived there by human activity, directly or indirectly, and either deliberately or accidentally.

The spread and intensification of introduced species can be a direct threat to the conservation of the Madagascar dwarf geckos. Researchers have discovered that in Nosy Be, Madagascar, non-native gecko and skink species moved into natural habitats where they hadn't resided before. This is believed to be causing displacement of the Madagascar dwarf gecko. The Hemidactylus frenatus, or House gecko, lives in urbanized areas in a commensal manner, while the Madagascar dwarf gecko prefers natural areas unaltered by humans. When House and other invasive geckos are introduced into disturbed habitats, it decreases available niche space. This contributes to the decline in the range of native dwarf gecko populations.

=== Trade ===
International trade of wild animals is widespread in Madagascar, and a significant portion of these exports are geckos. Madagascar is a member of the Convention on International Trade in Endangered Species of Wild Fauna and Flora (CITES) agreement, which aims to ensure that trade of wild plants and animals does not threaten the overall species. Part of this agreement is tracking exports. The CITES database has no record of Lygodactylus madagascariensis being exported, despite exports of other genus in the Gekkonidae family.

=== Restoration Efforts ===
Most of the Madagascar Dwarf Gecko's habitat has been altered, with the exception of Lokobe National Park on Nosy Be. This park contains some of the last lowland Sambirano forest, which is habitat to many threatened species. Historically, the park was managed as a ‘Re´serve Naturelle Inte´grale’, but in 2011 was upgraded to a ‘Parc National’ as a strengthened protection status.
