= Nosibe =

- Location in Madagascar
- Coordinates: 13°9′S 49°48′E
- Country: Madagascar
- Region: Sava
- District: Vohemar
- Elevation: 38 m (125 ft)

Population (2001)
  - Total: 9,000
- Time zone: UTC3 (EAT)

Nosibe is a town and commune (Malagasy: kaominina) in northern Madagascar. It belongs to the district of Vohemar, which is a part of Sava Region. The population of the commune was estimated to be approximately 9,000 in 2001 commune census.

Only primary schooling is available. The majority 85% of the population of the commune are farmers, while an additional 14% receives their livelihood from raising livestock. The most important crop is rice, while other important products are bananas, sugarcane and maize. Services provide employment for 0.5% of the population. Additionally fishing employs 0.5% of the population.
