= Bobakindro =

- Location in Madagascar
- Coordinates: 13°28′S 49°41′E
- Country: Madagascar
- Region: Sava
- District: Vohemar
- Elevation: 162 m (531 ft)

Population (2001)
  - Total: 8,000
- Time zone: UTC3 (EAT)

Bobakindro is a town and commune (Malagasy: kaominina) in northern Madagascar. It belongs to the district of Vohemar, which is a part of Sava Region. The population of the commune was estimated to be approximately 8,000 in 2001 commune census.

Only primary schooling is available. The majority 99.5% of the population of the commune are farmers. The most important crop is rice, while other important products are banana, coffee and coconut. Services provide employment for 0.5% of the population.
