= Fanambana River =

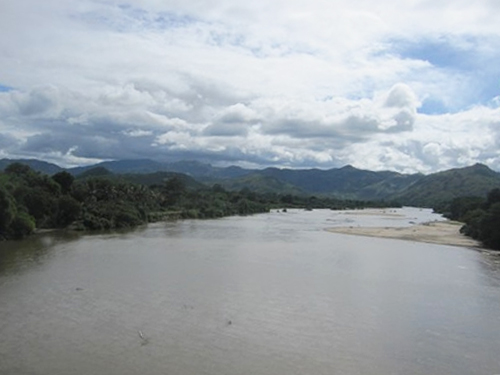
- Fanambana river

Location
- Country: Madagascar
- Region: Sava
- City: Fanambana

Physical characteristics
- Source
  - location: Marojejy Massif, Sava
  - elevation: 1,815 m (5,955 ft)
- Mouth: Indian Ocean
  - location: Sava
  - coordinates: 13°30′S 50°01′E
  - elevation: 0 m (0 ft)
- Length: 215 km (134 mi)
- Basin size: 1,827 km^{2} (705 sq mi)to 1,950.9 km^{2} (753.2 mi^{2})
- Discharge
  - location: Near mouth
  - average: (Period: 1971–2000)40.3 m^{3}/s (1,420 cu ft/s)
- Discharge
  - location: at bridge RN 5a
  - average: 4.5 m^{3}/s (160 cu ft/s)
  - minimum: 3.4 m^{3}/s (120 cu ft/s)
  - maximum: 70.5 m^{3}/s (2,490 cu ft/s)

Basin features
- River system: Fanambana River

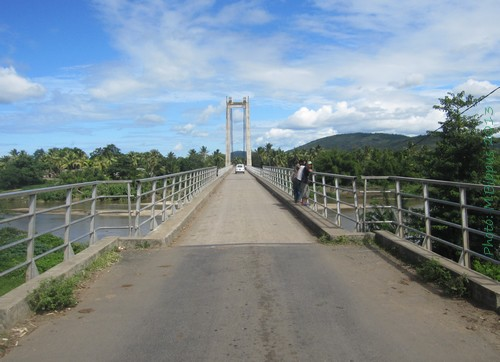
Fanambana Bridge on RN5a

The Fanambana River is located in northern Madagascar and crosses the Route Nationale 5a near Fanambana. Its sources are situated in the Marojejy Massif and flows into the Indian Ocean south of Vohemar.
