= Ambalasatrana =

- Location in Madagascar
- Coordinates: 13°44′S 49°42′E
- Country: Madagascar
- Region: Sava
- District: Vohemar
- Elevation: 223 m (732 ft)

Population (2001)
  - Total: 5,000
- Time zone: UTC3 (EAT)

Ambalasatrana is a town and commune (Malagasy: kaominina) in northern Madagascar. It belongs to the district of Vohemar, which is a part of Sava Region. The population of the commune was estimated to be approximately 5,000 in 2001 commune census.

Only primary schooling is available in town. The majority 99.9% of the population of the commune are farmers. The most important crops are rice and vanilla; also coffee is an important agricultural product. Services provide employment for 0.1% of the population.
