= Loky-Manambato =

Protected area near Daraina in northern Madagascar

- IUCN category V (protected landscape/seascape)
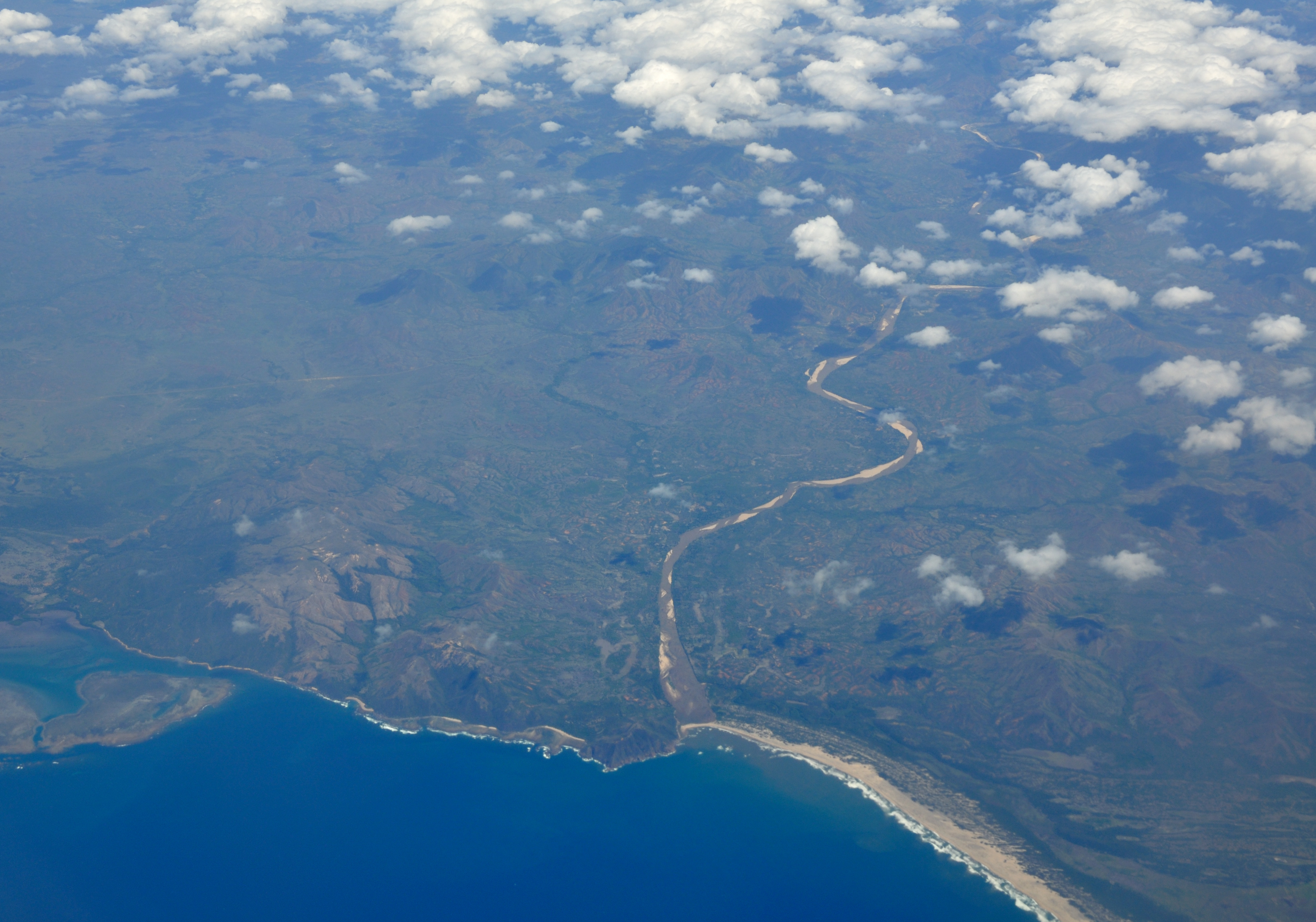
- The Manambato River
- Interactive map of Loky-Manambato
- Nearest city: Daraina
- Coordinates: 13°12′S 49°40′E
- Area: 2,484.09 km^{2} (959.11 sq mi)
- Designation: Paysage Harmonieux Protégé (harmonious protected landscape)
- Designated: 2005
- Administrator: Association Fanamby

Loky-Manambato is a protected area near Daraina in northern Madagascar, in the northern part of the Vohemar District. It is located in northern Sava Region, bounded on the north by the Loky River, on the south by the Manambato River, and on the east by the Indian Ocean. In its center flows the Manankolana river.

The protected area covers 2484.09 km^{2}, and includes a block of dry deciduous forests, mangroves, and a large lake, the Sahaka Lake.

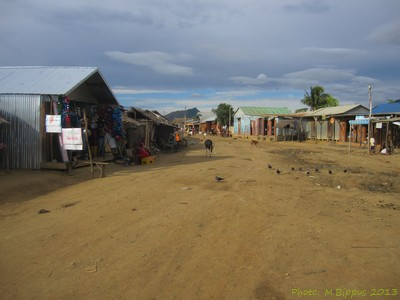
Daraina, Sava

== Flora and fauna ==
Loky-Manambato is in the dry deciduous forests of northern Madagascar, near the transition to the moist evergreen forests of eastern Madagascar and the montane forests of Madagascar's central highlands.

Plant communities in the protected area include montane moist evergreen forest, moist semideciduous rainforest, dry deciduous forest, riparian forest, rupicolous vegetation, littoral forest, swamp forest, humid grassland, marsh, lake, mangrove, secondary grassland, secondary thicket, and secondary forest.

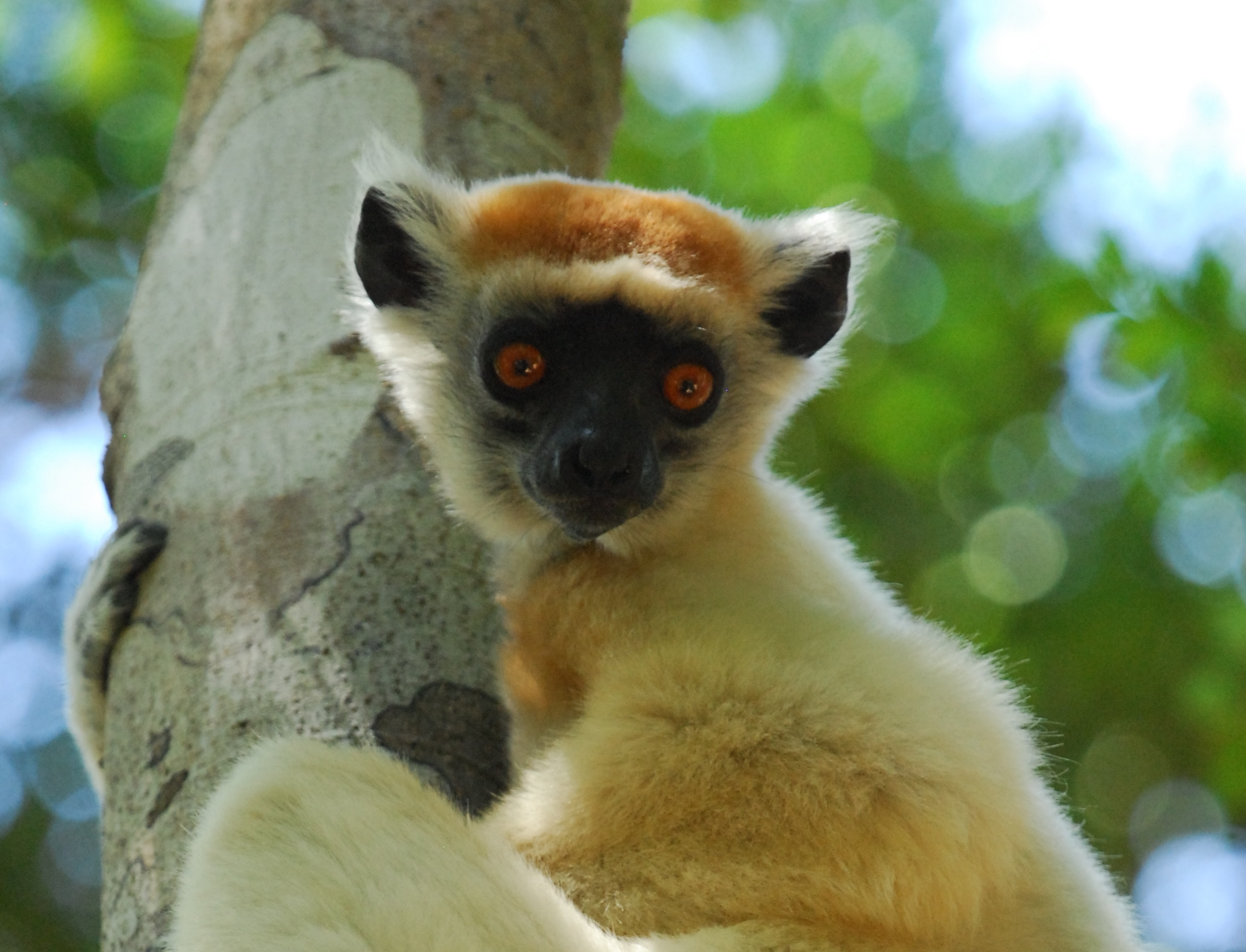
Propithecus tattersalli

8 species of lemurs, 5 species of carnivorous mammals (including the Malagasy civet (Fossa fossana) and the fossa (Cryptoprocta ferox)) 10 species of bats, 152 species of birds, 27 species of amphibians, and 71 species of reptiles live in the reserve. The golden-crowned sifaka or Tattersall's sifaka (Propithecus tattersalli) and the largest scorpion of Madagascar Heteroscorpion magnus were described from specimens collected in this reserve.
