= Ampisikina =

- Location in Madagascar
- Coordinates: 12°56′S 49°48′E
- Country: Madagascar
- Region: Sava
- District: Vohemar
- Elevation: 25 m (82 ft)

Population (2001)
  - Total: 4,000
- Time zone: UTC3 (EAT)

Ampisikina or Ampisikinana is a town and commune (Malagasy: kaominina) in northern Madagascar. It belongs to the district of Vohemar, which is a part of Sava Region. The population of the commune was estimated to be approximately 4,000 in 2001 commune census.

Only primary schooling is available. The majority 81.5% of the population of the commune are farmers, while an additional 3% receives their livelihood from raising livestock. The most important crop is rice, while other important products are maize and cassava. Industry and services provide employment for 12% and 0.5% of the population, respectively. Additionally fishing employs 3% of the population.
