= Milanoa =

- Location in Madagascar
- Coordinates: 13°35′S 49°47′E
- Country: Madagascar
- Region: Sava
- District: Vohemar
- Elevation: 92 m (302 ft)

Population (2001)
  - Total: 17,000
- Time zone: UTC3 (EAT)

Milanoa is a town and commune (Malagasy: kaominina) in northern Madagascar. It belongs to the district of Vohemar, which is a part of Sava Region. The population of the commune was estimated to be approximately 17,000 in 2001 commune census.

== Education ==
Primary and junior level secondary education are available.

== Farming ==
The majority 99% of the population of the commune are farmers, while an additional 0.5% receives their livelihood from raising livestock. The most important crops are rice and vanilla, while other important agricultural products are sugarcane and beans. Services provide employment for 0.5% of the population.
