= Vohemar Airport =

Airport in Madagascar

- IATA: VOH; ICAO: FMNV

Summary
- Airport type: Public
- Operator: ADEMA (Aéroports de Madagascar)
- Serves: Vohemar
- Location: Sava Region, Madagascar
- Elevation AMSL: 19 ft / 6 m
- Coordinates: 13°22′33″S 50°00′10″E

Map
- Location within Madagascar

Runways
Direction	Length		Surface
Direction	ft	m	Surface
14/32	4,236	1,291	Asphalt
- DAFIF

Vohemar Airport (IATA: VOH, ICAO: FMNV) is an airport in Vohemar, Sava Region, Madagascar.
