= Antsahavaribe, Vohemar =

Antsahavaribe
- Location in Madagascar
- Coordinates: 13°51′S 49°52′E
- Country: Madagascar
- Region: Sava
- District: Vohemar
- Elevation: 216 m (709 ft)

Population (2001)
  - Total: 9,000
- Time zone: UTC3 (EAT)

Antsahavaribe is a town and commune (Malagasy: kaominina) in northern Madagascar. It belongs to the district of Vohemar, which is a part of Sava Region. The population of the commune was estimated to be approximately 9,000 in the 2001 census.

Only primary schooling is available. 99.98% of the population of the commune are farmers. The most important crop is vanilla, while other important products are coffee, sugarcane and rice. Services provide employment for 0.02% of the population.
