= Belambo, Vohemar =

Belambo
- Location in Madagascar
- Coordinates: 13°57′S 49°49′E
- Country: Madagascar
- Region: Sava
- District: Vohemar
- Elevation: 356 m (1,168 ft)

Population (2001)
  - Total: 6,000
- Time zone: UTC3 (EAT)

Belambo is a town and commune (Malagasy: kaominina) in northern Madagascar. It belongs to Vohemar District, which is a part of Sava Region. The population of the commune was estimated to be approximately 6,000 in 2001 commune census.

Primary and junior level secondary education are available in town. The majority 99.9% of the population of the commune are farmers. The most important crop is vanilla, while other important products are coffee, beans and rice. Services provide employment for 0.1% of the population.
