= Daraina =

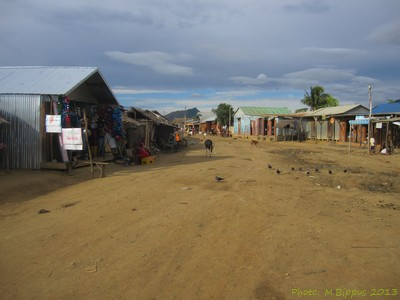

- Location in Madagascar
- Coordinates: 13°12′S 49°40′E
- Country: Madagascar
- Region: Sava
- District: Vohemar
- Elevation: 92 m (302 ft)

Population (2001)
  - Total: 10,000
- Time zone: UTC3 (EAT)

Daraina is a town and commune (Malagasy: kaominina) in northern Madagascar. It belongs to the district of Vohemar, which is a part of Sava Region. The city is located at the unpaved part of the Route Nationale 5a between Vohemar and Ambilobe.

The population of the commune was estimated to be approximately 10,000 in 2001 commune census.

Primary and junior level secondary education are available in town. The majority 98% of the population of the commune are farmers. The most important crop is rice, while other important products are banana, maize, cassava and sweet potato. Services provide employment for 2% of the population.

There are also artisanal gold mining activities on the rivers nearby.

== Protected areas ==
The protected area of Loky Manambato is situated at 15km near Daraina. It hosts the only side where the Golden-crowned sifaka (Propithecus tattersalli) can be found.

== Geography ==
The town is located at the Manankolana river.
