= Andrafainkona =

- Location in Madagascar
- Coordinates: 13°44′S 49°28′E
- Country: Madagascar
- Region: Sava
- District: Vohemar
- Elevation: 740 m (2,430 ft)

Population (2001)
  - Total: 5,000
- Time zone: UTC3 (EAT)

Andrafainkona is a town and commune (Malagasy: kaominina) in northern Madagascar. It belongs to the district of Vohemar, which is a part of Sava Region. The population of the commune was estimated to be approximately 5,000 in 2001 commune census.

Only primary schooling is available. The majority 99% of the population of the commune are farmers. The most important crops are rice and vanilla, while other important agricultural products are coffee and beans. Services provide employment for 1% of the population.
