= Loky River =

Loky
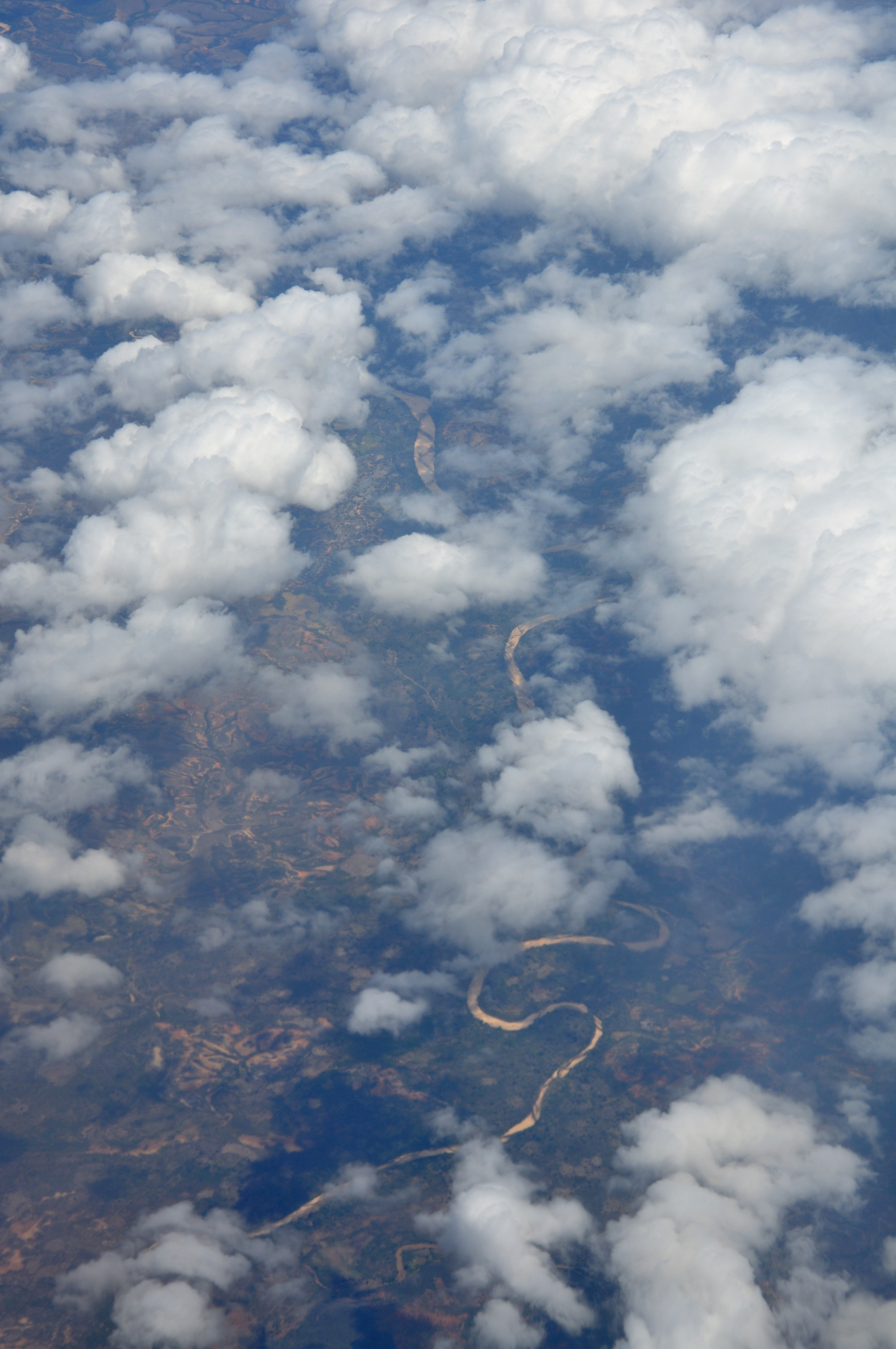
- Aerial photo of lower section

- Map of Malagasy rivers (Loky flows from the northern part to the eastern coast).

Location
- Country: Madagascar
- Region: Sava

Physical characteristics
- Source
  - location: Sava, Madagascar
- Mouth
  - location: Sava Indian Ocean
  - coordinates: 12.788718°S 49.663046°E
- Length: 80 km (50 mi)

The Loky River, also known as the Lokia River, is located in northern Madagascar. It drains in the north-eastern coast, into the Indian Ocean and forms the natural border between the Diana and Sava Regions.

It is crossed by the RN 5a near Anivorano du Nord. Its mouth is situated in Lokia Bay.
