= Antsirabato Airport =

Airport in Madagascar

- IATA: ANM; ICAO: FMNH

Summary
- Airport type: Public/Military
- Operator: ADEMA (Aéroports de Madagascar)
- Serves: Antalaha
- Location: Antalaha, Madagascar
- Elevation AMSL: 20 ft / 6 m
- Coordinates: 14°59′57″S 50°19′12″E

Map
- Location within Madagascar

Runways
Direction	Length		Surface
Direction	ft	m	Surface
18/36	3,419	1,042	Asphalt

Antsirabato Airport is an airport in Antalaha, Madagascar (IATA: ANM, ICAO: FMNH). This airport can be accessed by the National road 53. It is in a distance of 12 km from Antalaha.
