= Antalaha =

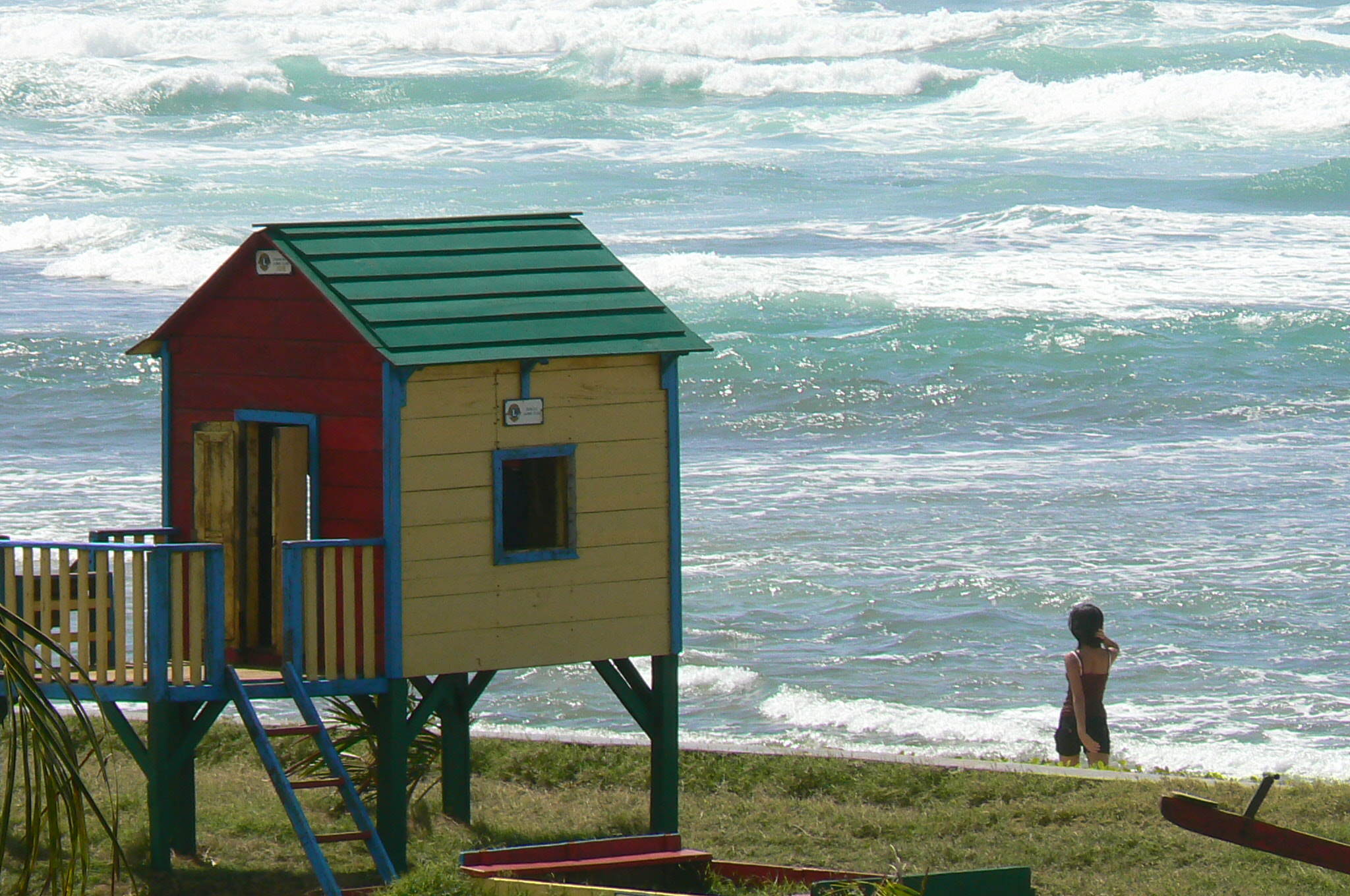
- Antalaha beach

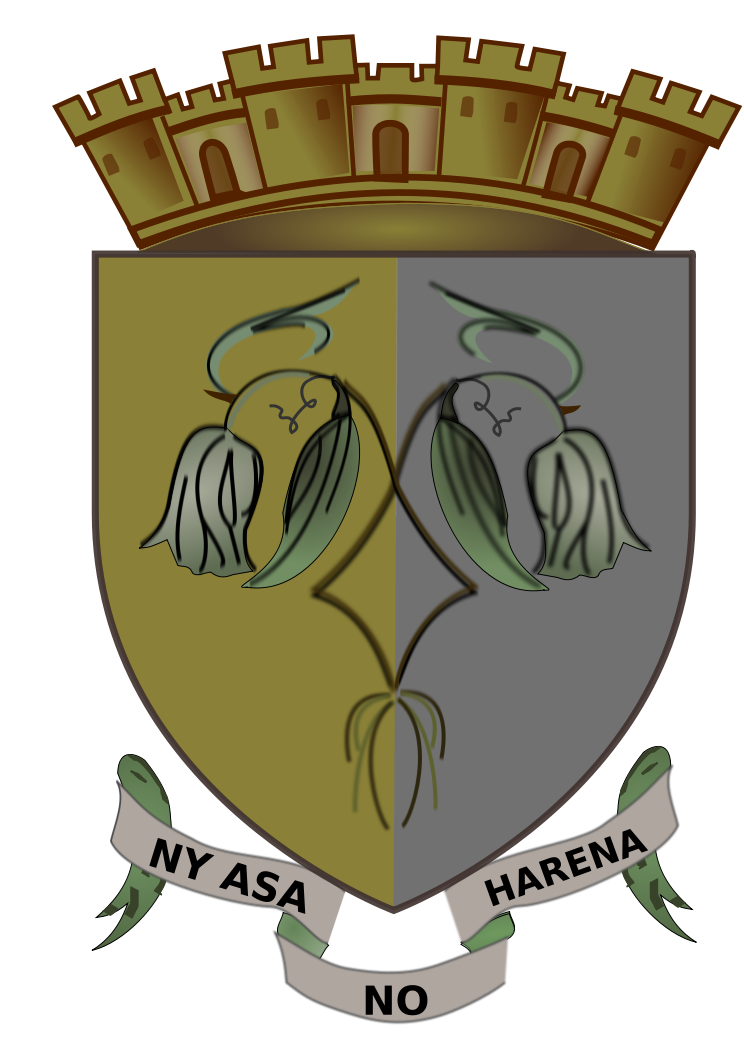
- Coat of arms

- Location in Madagascar
- Coordinates: 14°53′S 50°15′E
- Country: Madagascar
- Region: Sava
- District: Antalaha

Government
  - Mayor: Eddie Fernand

Area
  - Total: 7.084 km^{2} (2.735 sq mi)
- Elevation: 7 m (23 ft)

Population (2018)Census
  - Total: 67,888
  - Ethnicities: Betsimisaraka Tsimihety and Antaimoro
- Time zone: UTC3 (EAT)
- Postal code: 206
- Website: Antalaha

Antalaha is an urban municipality in northern Madagascar. It belongs to the district of Antalaha, which is a part of Sava Region. The population of Antalaha was 67.888 in 2018.

Farming provides employment for 40% of the working population. The most important crop is vanilla, while other important products are cloves and rice. Industry and services provide employment for 30.00% and 29.98% of the population, respectively. Additionally fishing employs 0.02% of the population.

== Infrastructures ==
The National road 5a connects the town with Sambava (81 km) and Ambilobe in the North. Antalaha has a maritime harbour. The local airport is situated at 12km west of Antalaha but it didn't receive any flights since 2015.

== Education ==
In addition to primary schooling the town offers secondary education at both junior and senior levels. The town has a permanent court and hospital.

== Rivers ==
Ambinany river, Ankavanana and Ankavia.

== Sports ==
- JS Antalaha - football champion of SAVA in 2012, 2014 and 2019. Malagasy champion 1973/

== Climate ==
Antalaha experiences a humid trade-wind tropical rainforest climate (Koppen Af) with prodigious rainfall all year-round. The heaviest rainfall, highest humidity, and hottest temperatures are typically observed from December to April, the wettest month being January, receiving a copious average of 358.1 mm (14.10 in) of total precipitation. The driest month is September, receiving an average of 90.9 mm (3.58 in) of precipitation. The months from May to November are slightly drier, cooler, and less humid. Despite this, hot temperatures, high humidity, and high rainfall dominate year-round in Antalaha.

Climate data for Antalaha (1991-2020)
Month	Jan	Feb	Mar	Apr	May	Jun	Jul	Aug	Sep	Oct	Nov	Dec	Year
Record high °C (°F)	36.0 (96.8)	35.5 (95.9)	34.0 (93.2)	33.4 (92.1)	32.5 (90.5)	31.7 (89.1)	30.6 (87.1)	30.1 (86.2)	30.6 (87.1)	32.0 (89.6)	33.7 (92.7)	35.9 (96.6)	36.0 (96.8)
Mean daily maximum °C (°F)	30.4 (86.7)	30.7 (87.3)	29.9 (85.8)	29.3 (84.7)	28.2 (82.8)	26.3 (79.3)	25.2 (77.4)	25.3 (77.5)	26.2 (79.2)	27.6 (81.7)	29.0 (84.2)	30.2 (86.4)	28.2 (82.8)
Daily mean °C (°F)	26.8 (80.2)	27.0 (80.6)	26.6 (79.9)	26.0 (78.8)	24.8 (76.6)	23.1 (73.6)	22.1 (71.8)	22.1 (71.8)	22.7 (72.9)	23.9 (75.0)	25.2 (77.4)	26.4 (79.5)	24.7 (76.5)
Mean daily minimum °C (°F)	23.1 (73.6)	23.2 (73.8)	23.1 (73.6)	22.6 (72.7)	21.4 (70.5)	19.8 (67.6)	18.9 (66.0)	18.8 (65.8)	19.2 (66.6)	20.2 (68.4)	21.4 (70.5)	22.6 (72.7)	21.2 (70.2)
Record low °C (°F)	20.5 (68.9)	20.4 (68.7)	20.3 (68.5)	19.7 (67.5)	18.5 (65.3)	15.7 (60.3)	15.3 (59.5)	15.3 (59.5)	15.1 (59.2)	16.6 (61.9)	18.0 (64.4)	19.0 (66.2)	15.1 (59.2)
Average precipitation mm (inches)	268.7 (10.58)	285.8 (11.25)	292.4 (11.51)	205.2 (8.08)	155.0 (6.10)	132.9 (5.23)	151.0 (5.94)	170.0 (6.69)	86.4 (3.40)	88.6 (3.49)	96.9 (3.81)	203.6 (8.02)	2,083.5 (82.03)
Average precipitation days (≥ 1.0 mm)	15.8	14.8	15.8	14.3	14.2	15.3	17.3	15.4	13.0	11.2	10.1	13.0	170.2
Mean monthly sunshine hours	210.1	199.7	203.6	205.1	211.1	178.6	180.9	197.2	208.9	238.5	226.3	225.1	2,485.1
Source: NOAA (sun, 1961-1990)
