= Vohemar District =

- District
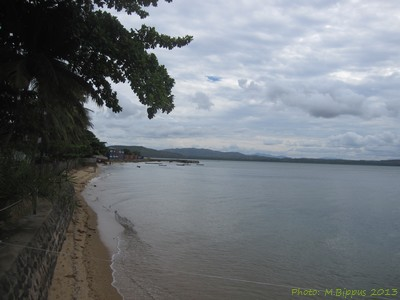
- Port & beach of Vohemar

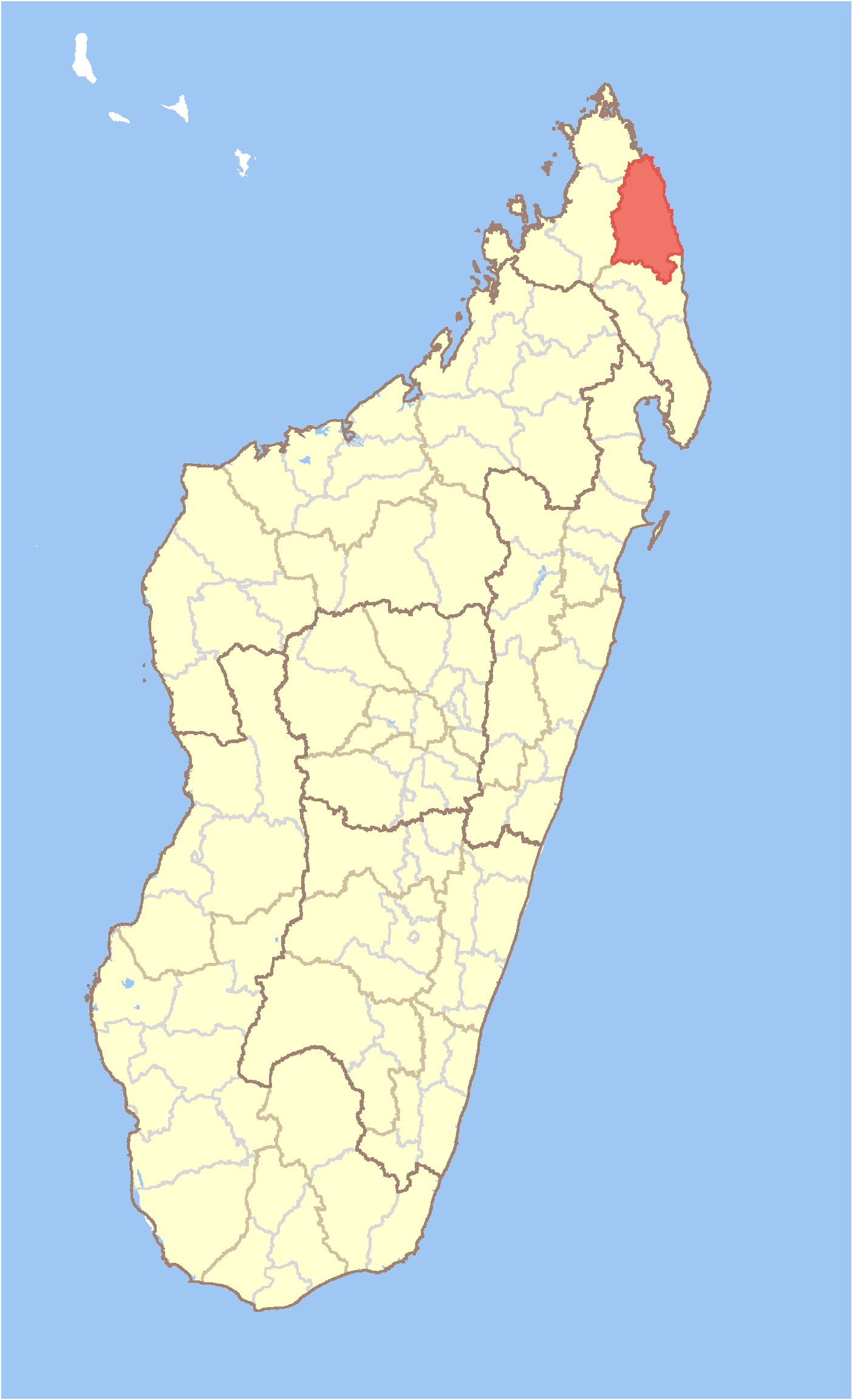
- Location in Madagascar
- Coordinates: 13°19′S 49°43′E
- Country: Madagascar
- Region: Sava

Area
  - Total: 8,268.55 km^{2} (3,192.51 sq mi)

Population (2020)
  - Total: 264,236
  - Density: 31.9568/km^{2} (82.7676/sq mi)
  - Ethnicities: Antankarana
- Time zone: UTC3 (EAT)
- Postal code: 209

Vohemar District (also Vohimarina District) is a district in northern Madagascar. It is a part of Sava Region and borders the districts of Sambava to the south, Ambilobe to the west and Antsiranana II to the north. The area is 8,268.55 km^{2} (3,193 sq mi) and the population was estimated to be 264,236 in 2020. Its capitol is Vohemar.

== Communes ==
The district is further divided into 19 communes:

- Ambalasatrana
- Ambinanin'andravory
- Amboriala
- Ampanefena
- Ampisikina
- Ampondra
- Andrafainkona
- Andravory
- Antsahavaribe
- Antsirabe Nord
- Belambo
- Bobakindro
- Daraina
- Fanambana
- Maromokotra
- Milanoa
- Nosibe
- Tsarabaria
- Vohemar

== Protected areas ==
- the protected area of Loky-Manambato, near Daraina.
