= Andapa =

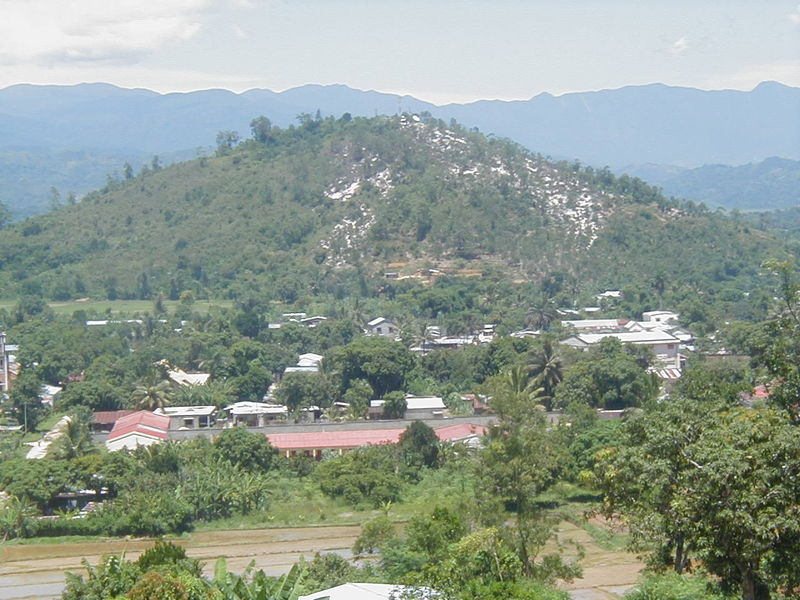
- entrance of Andapa

- Location in Madagascar
- Coordinates: 14°39′S 49°39′E
- Country: Madagascar
- Region: Sava
- District: Andapa

Area
  - Total: 43.0 km^{2} (16.6 sq mi)
- Elevation: 530 m (1,740 ft)

Population (2018 census)
  - Total: 34,616
  - Density: 805/km^{2} (2,090/sq mi)
- Time zone: UTC3 (EAT)
- Postal code: 205
- Website: http://andapa.marojejy.com

Andapa is a town and commune (Malagasy: firaisana) in northern Madagascar. It belongs to the district of Andapa, which is a part of Sava Region. According to 2018 commune census the population of Andapa was 34,616.

Andapa is served by a local airport. It is also a site of industrial-scale mining. The majority 88% of the population are farmers, while an additional 0.5% receives their livelihood from raising livestock. The most important crop is rice, while other important products are beans, tomatoes and vanilla. Industry and services provide employment for 1.5% and 10% of the population, respectively.

== Geography ==
The capital of the Sava Region, Sambava is at a distance of 108 km.

It is situated at the Lokoho River.

== Nature ==
- Marojejy National Park
- The administration office of the Anjanaharibe-Sud Reserve is situated in Andapa. The reserve is at 25 km from this town.
