= Route nationale 5a (Madagascar) =

Highway in Madagascar

Route information
- Length: 406 km (252 mi)

Major junctions
- to end: Ambilobe
- from RN 6 Madagascar

Location
- Country: Madagascar

Highway system
- Roads in Madagascar

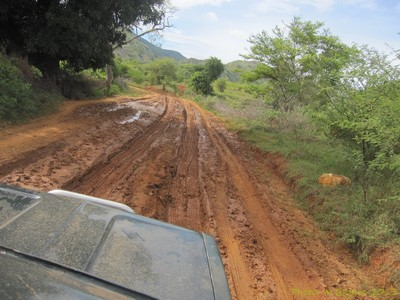
RN 5a between Daraina and Vohemar (in 2012, before being paved)

Route nationale 5a (RN 5a) is a secondary highway in Madagascar of 406 km, running from Ambilobe to Antalaha. It crosses the regions of Diana and Sava.

The section from Ambilobe to Vohemar was completely unpaved and in very bad condition until 2020 when important road works had been undertaken. This part of the route had been paved in September 2022. From Vohemar to Antalaha the road is paved and in good condition.

== Selected locations on route ==
(north to south)

- Ambilobe - (intersection with RN 6 to Antsiranana and Ambondromamy)
- Daraina (75 km)
- Vohemar (152 km)
- Sambava (303 km - intersection with RN 3b to Andapa)
- Antalaha

== Gallery ==
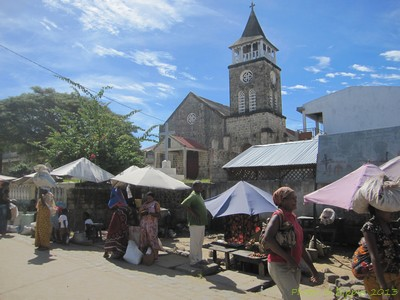
Ambilobe

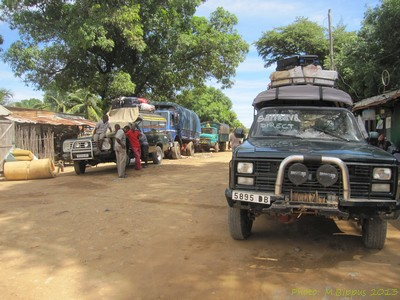
4x4 Bush taxis that serve between Ambilobe and Sava

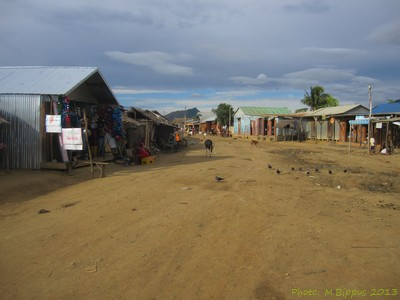
crossing Daraina

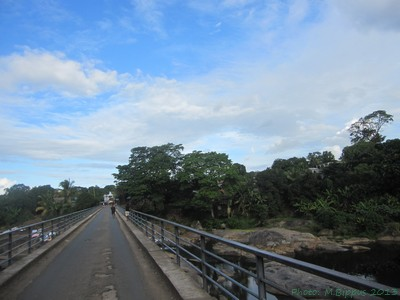
RN5a at Antsirabe Nord

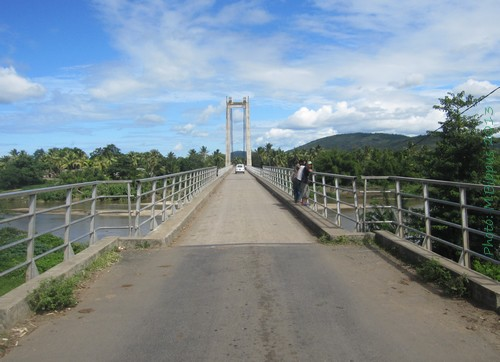
Fanambana River bridge at Fanambana

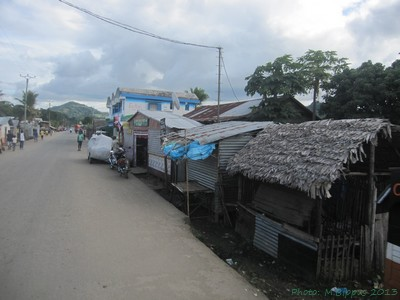
Ampanefena

== See also ==
- List of roads in Madagascar
- Transport in Madagascar
