= Vohemar =

Vohemar Iharana
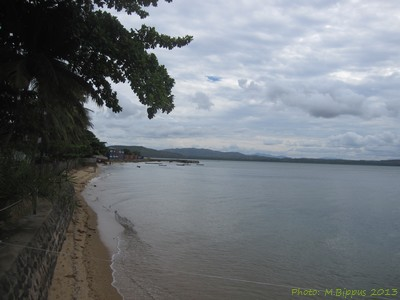
- Port and Bay of Vohemar

- Location in Madagascar
- Coordinates: 13°21′35″S 50°0′41″E
- Country: Madagascar
- Region: Sava
- District: Vohemar

Area
  - Total: 17 km^{2} (6.6 sq mi)

Population (2018)
  - Total: 55,216
- Time zone: UTC3 (EAT)
- Postal code: 209

Vohemar (Malagasy: Vohimarina [vuiˈmarʲnə̥] or Iharana [iaˈraŋə̥]) is a coastal city and a municipality in northern Madagascar. It belongs to the district of Iharana, which is a part of Sava Region. It had a population of 55,216 in 2018.

In addition to primary schooling the town offers secondary education at both junior and senior levels. The town provides access to hospital services to its citizens.

From the late medieval period, Northern Madagascar had a number of small and large trading towns ruled by Swahili merchants. Vohemar, one such town, was likely founded around the 13th Century as a Swahili trading port.

Farming and raising livestock provides employment for 20% and 5% of the working population. The most important crop is cassava, while other important products are peanut, maize and rice. Industry and services provide employment for 20% and 45% of the population, respectively. Additionally fishing employs 10% of the population.

== Infrastructures ==
There is a seaport and a local airport.

Vohemar is situated at the Route National 5a that connects the city with Ambilobe and Sambava/Antalaha.

A solar energy park of 800 kw was installed in Vohemar in 2022.

== Sports ==
- FC Jaolahin'Iharana - regional football champion (Sava) 2018.
- FC Iharana - regional football champion (Sava) 2019.

== Personalities ==
- Jean Omer Beriziky, prime minister of Madagascar, 2011-2014.
