= Sambava =

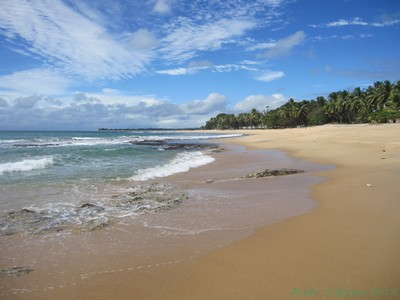
- Sambava Beach

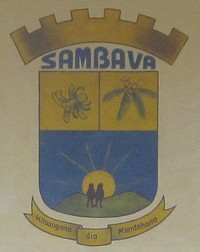
- Coat of arms

- Location in Madagascar
- Coordinates: 14°16′S 50°10′E
- Country: Madagascar
- Region: Sava
- District: Sambava

Government
  - Mayor: Judicaël Ramangalaza

Area
  - Total: 98.9 km^{2} (38.2 sq mi)

Population (2018 census)
  - Total: 84,039
  - Density: 850/km^{2} (2,200/sq mi)
  - Ethnicities: Betsimisaraka
- Time zone: UTC3 (EAT)
- Postal code: 208
- Climate: Af

Sambava [samˈbav] is a city and commune (commune urbaine; Malagasy: kaominina) at the east coast of northern Madagascar. It is the capital of Sambava District and Sava Region. The population of the commune was 84,039 in as of the 2018 commune census. North of Sambava is the Ampasimbato Lake (50 km).

== Infrastructure ==
Sambava is located on Route Nationale 5a Ambilobe - Antalaha. It is also the starting point of the National road 3b to Andapa. It has a local, regional airport. In addition to primary schooling the town offers secondary education at both junior and senior levels. The town provides access to hospital services to its citizens.

== Economy ==
Farming and raising livestock provides employment for 45% and 0.5% of the working population. The most important crop is vanilla, while other important products are coconut and rice. Industry and services provide employment for 0.5% and 53.5% of the population, respectively. Additionally fishing employs 0.5% of the population.

Sambava disposes of white, sandy beaches with several hotels. The Marojejy National Park is close to Sambava on the road to Andapa.

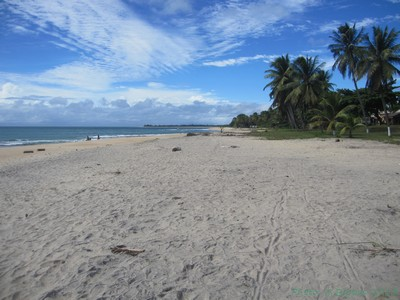
Beach view from Sambava

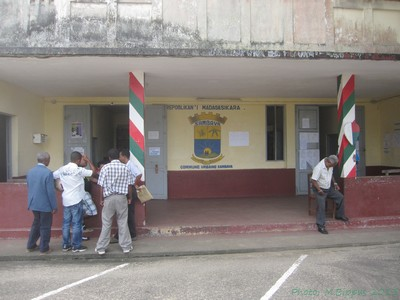
Townhall

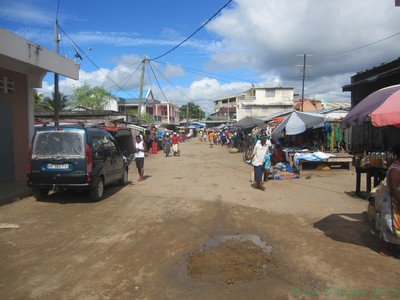
Market road in Sambava

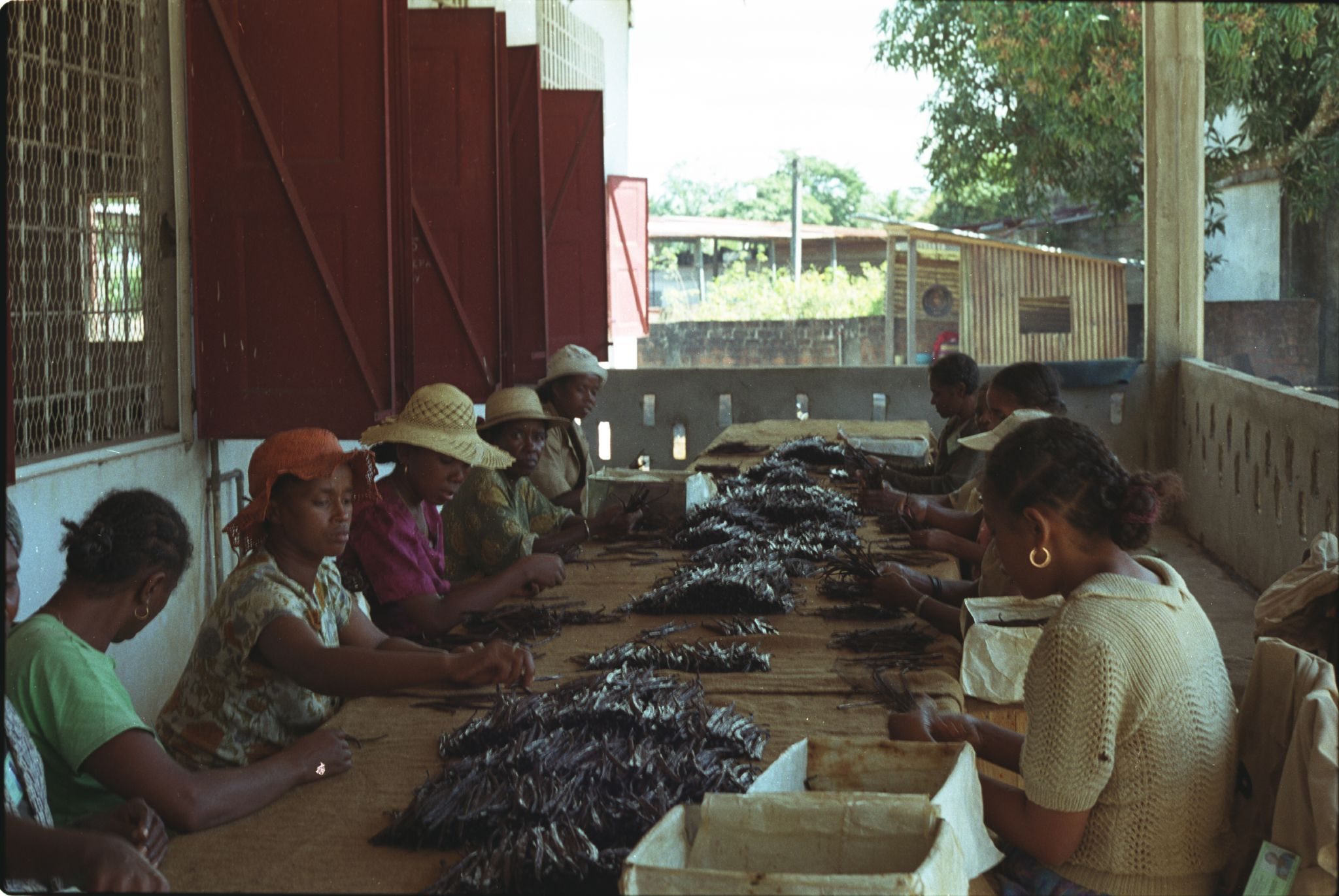
Women grading vanilla beans

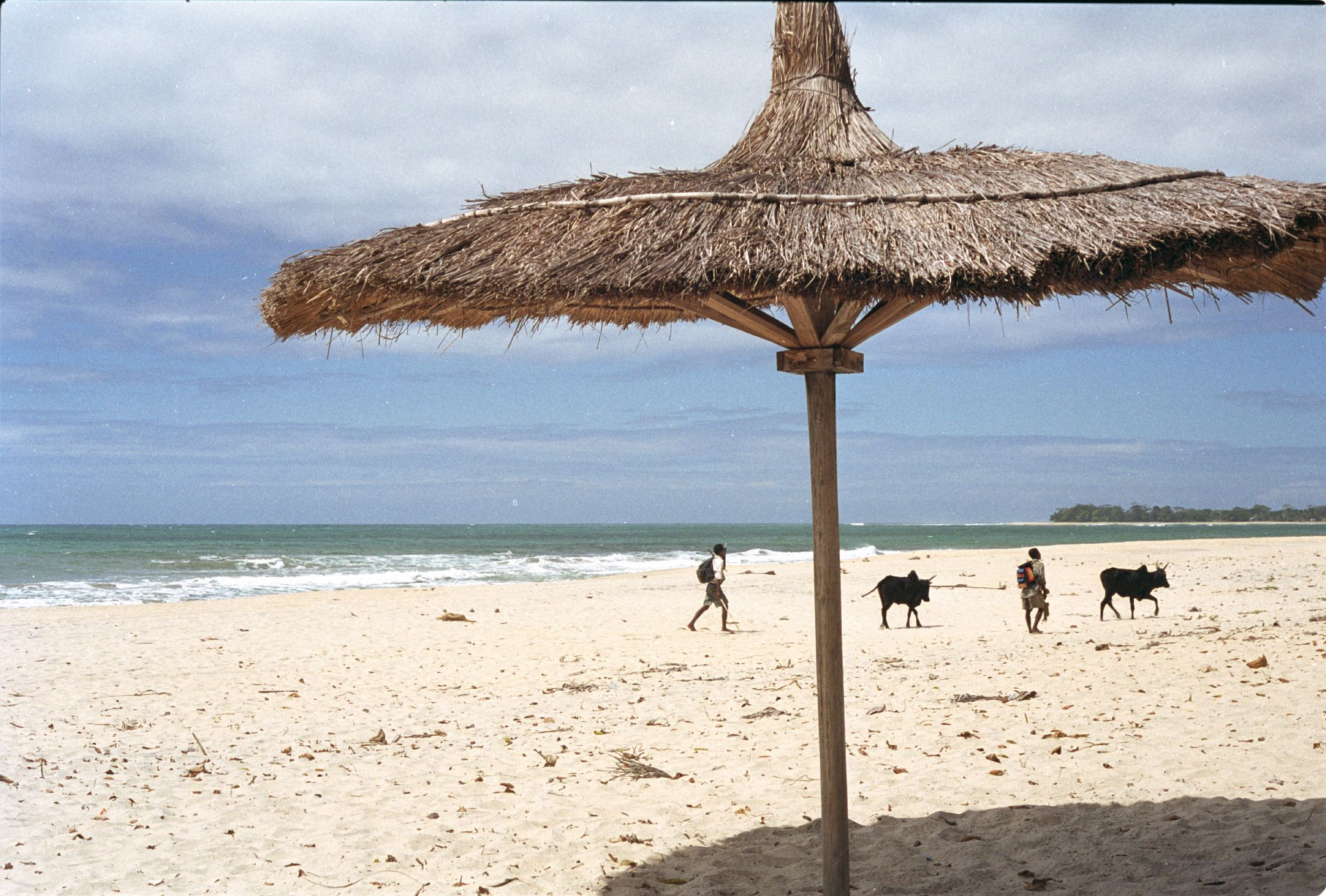
Beach view from Sambava

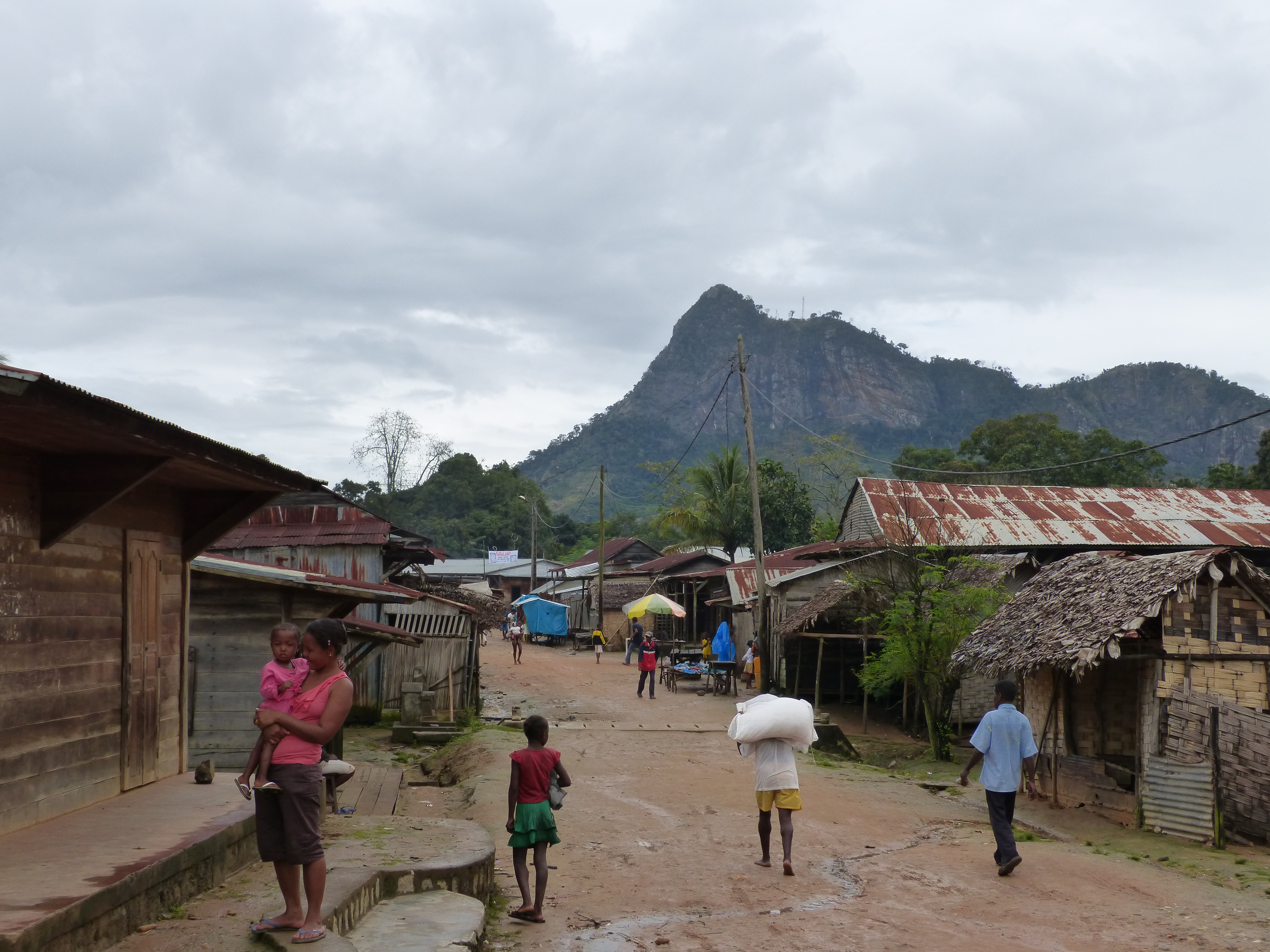
the village of Antsirabe Nord

== Commune ==
The municipality of Sambava covers the surrounding 16 fokontany (villages): Ambia, Antohomaro, Ambodisatrana I, Amboisatrana II, Sambava centre, Antaimby, Antsirabe-Nord, Antanifotsy I, Antanifotsy II, Ambariomihambana, Ambohitrakongona, Ampisasahanala, Analamandrorofo, Ambatofitatra, Ampandrozonana, Besopaka, Menagisy, Soavinandriana.

== Sports ==
- FC Joel Sava (regional football champion 2010, 2011, 2015 & 2016).

== Climate ==
Climate data for Sambava (1991-2020)
Month	Jan	Feb	Mar	Apr	May	Jun	Jul	Aug	Sep	Oct	Nov	Dec	Year
Record high °C (°F)	35.4 (95.7)	35.2 (95.4)	35.0 (95.0)	34.0 (93.2)	33.4 (92.1)	31.0 (87.8)	30.0 (86.0)	30.2 (86.4)	30.2 (86.4)	31.8 (89.2)	33.2 (91.8)	35.2 (95.4)	35.4 (95.7)
Mean daily maximum °C (°F)	30.8 (87.4)	30.9 (87.6)	30.5 (86.9)	29.9 (85.8)	28.8 (83.8)	27.0 (80.6)	26.1 (79.0)	26.2 (79.2)	26.7 (80.1)	27.9 (82.2)	29.1 (84.4)	30.2 (86.4)	28.7 (83.7)
Daily mean °C (°F)	27.1 (80.8)	27.2 (81.0)	27.0 (80.6)	26.3 (79.3)	25.1 (77.2)	23.4 (74.1)	22.5 (72.5)	22.5 (72.5)	23.1 (73.6)	24.2 (75.6)	25.4 (77.7)	26.6 (79.9)	25.0 (77.0)
Mean daily minimum °C (°F)	23.4 (74.1)	23.4 (74.1)	23.4 (74.1)	22.7 (72.9)	21.4 (70.5)	19.9 (67.8)	18.9 (66.0)	18.8 (65.8)	19.3 (66.7)	20.5 (68.9)	21.7 (71.1)	22.9 (73.2)	21.4 (70.5)
Record low °C (°F)	19.6 (67.3)	19.6 (67.3)	19.0 (66.2)	17.8 (64.0)	16.2 (61.2)	15.0 (59.0)	13.0 (55.4)	14.0 (57.2)	14.8 (58.6)	15.6 (60.1)	16.0 (60.8)	18.4 (65.1)	13.0 (55.4)
Average precipitation mm (inches)	289.3 (11.39)	273.2 (10.76)	331.3 (13.04)	245.1 (9.65)	183.3 (7.22)	145.4 (5.72)	165.6 (6.52)	134.4 (5.29)	108.4 (4.27)	108.1 (4.26)	119.1 (4.69)	206.9 (8.15)	2,310.1 (90.95)
Average precipitation days (≥ 1 mm)	15.7	14.5	15.4	13.7	13.8	14.3	15.1	15.5	13.1	11.4	11.5	13.1	167.1
Mean monthly sunshine hours	222	218	216	215	222	191	191	201	215	243	230	240	2,604
Source: NOAA (sun, 1961-1990)
