= Sava Region =

- Region
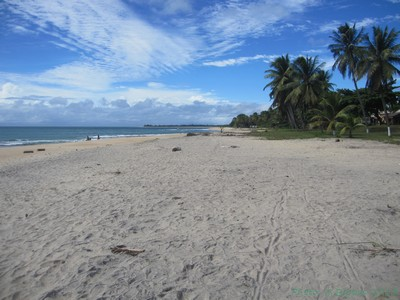
- Beach at Sambava, Sava

- Location in Madagascar
- Coordinates: 14°16′12″S 50°10′12″E
- Country: Madagascar
- Capital: Sambava

Government
  - Gouverneur: Justin Tokely

Area
  - Total: 25,518 km^{2} (9,853 sq mi)

Population (2018)
  - Total: 1,123,013
  - Density: 44.009/km^{2} (113.98/sq mi)
- Time zone: UTC3 (EAT)
- HDI (2018): 0.570 medium · 3rd of 22

Sava is a region in northern Madagascar. Its capital is Sambava. Until 2009 Sava belonged to Antsiranana Province. The region is situated at the northern part of the east coast of Madagascar. It is bordered by the region Diana to the north, Sofia to the west, and Ambatosoa to the south. As of 2018, its population was 1,123,013 and the total area is 25,518 km^{2} (9,853 sq mi). The region contains wild areas such as Marojejy National Park.

The name of the region is composed of the initial letters of its four principal towns: Sambava, Antalaha, Iharana (Vohimaro), and Andapa. Each of these towns claims itself the World Capital of Vanilla, a spice of which the region is the largest producer of in the world (especially the highly sought Bourbon vanilla variety).

The economic importance of vanilla cultivation in the Sava Region encouraged the reconstruction of the road that connects the towns, called the Route de la vanille (The Vanilla Route), in the latter half of 2005. However, due to the volatile fluctuations in the price of vanilla, in turn often caused by the dramatic cyclones occurring in the southwestern Indian Ocean, many poor vanilla farmers in the Sava Region have periodically been forced to resort to the mostly illegal logging of ebony, palisander, and rosewood.

== Geography ==
=== Administrative divisions ===
Sava Region is divided into four districts, which are subdivided into 75 communes:

- Andapa District - 17 communes
- Antalaha District - 14 communes
- Sambava District - 25 communes
- Vohemar District (Iharana District) - 19 communes

=== Ports ===
There are regional ports in Vohemar and Antalaha.

=== Protected areas ===
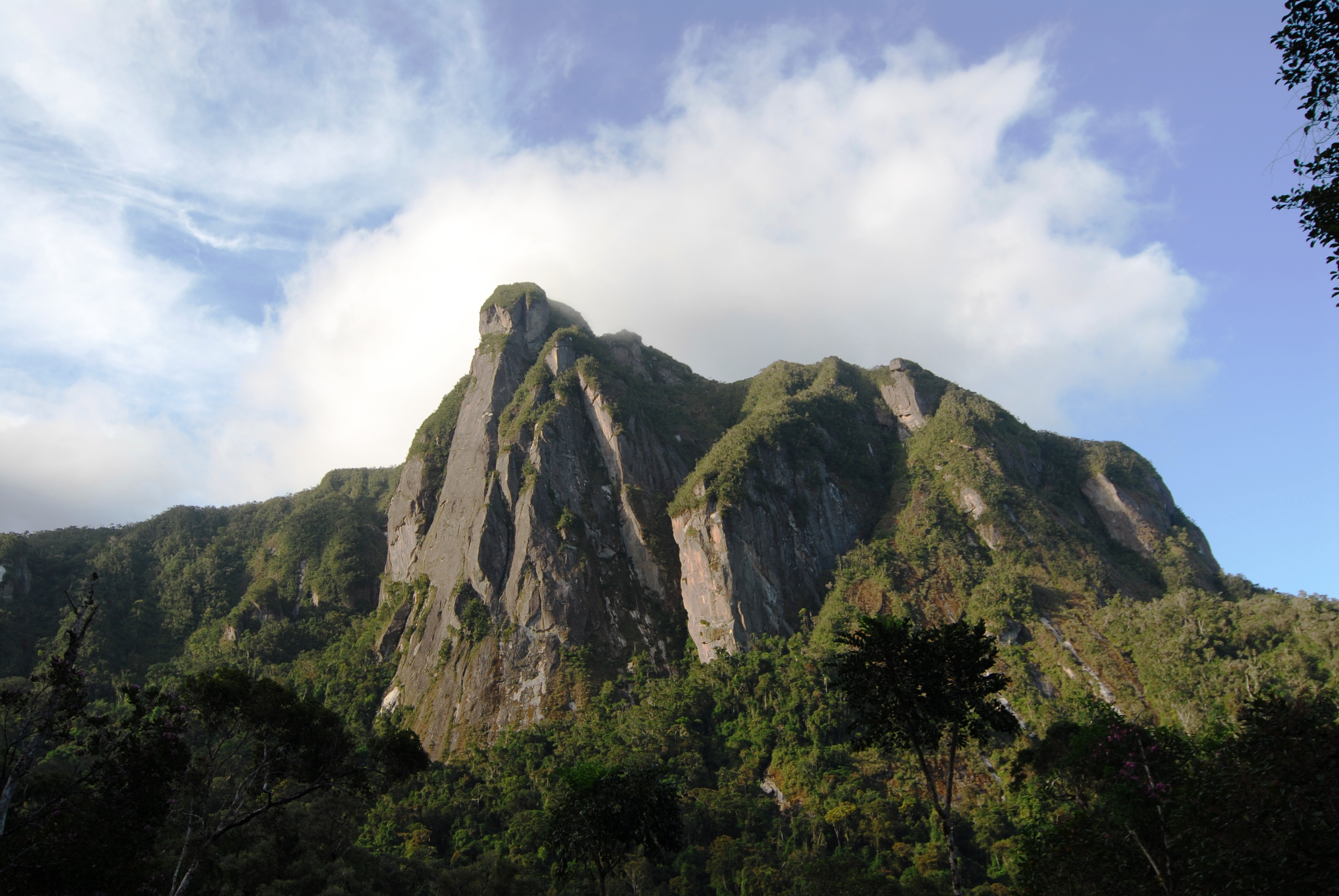
Ambatotsondrona in Marojejy National Park

- Loky Manambato New Protected Area (near Daraina)
- Makirovana Tsihomanaomby New Protected Area
- Marojejy National Park
- Part of Masoala National Park
- Anjanaharibe-Sud Reserve
- Part of Makira Natural Park
- Part of COMATSA Avaratra New Protected Area
- Part of COMATSA Atsimo New Protected Area
- Macolline Park (private)

=== Rivers ===
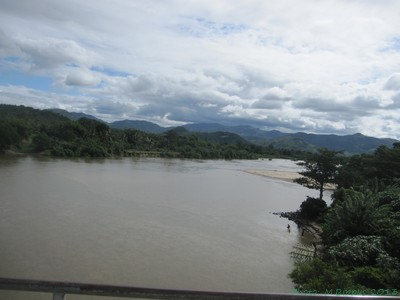
the Fanambana, Sava

The main rivers of the Sava Region are (north to south):

- Loky River (on the border to Diana Region)
- Manambato River
- Manambaty River
- Fanambana River
- Bemarivo River
- Androranga River
- Lokoho River
- Onive River
- Ankavanana

== Transport ==
=== Airports ===
- Andapa Airport
- Antalaha Airport
- Doany Airport
- Sambava Airport
- Iharana Airport

=== Roads ===
This region is crossed by 454 km of national roads:

- National road 5a from North to South (Daraina, Vohemar, Sambava, Antalaha)
- National road 3b from Sambava to Andapa (97km)
- National road 53 from Antalaha to the Antsirabato Airport (12 km)
- National road 59a - from RN 5a to Vohemar (3km)

furthermore by 520 km provincial roads (RIP) and 230 km of roads without a classification.

== Other ==
- Regions of Madagascar.
