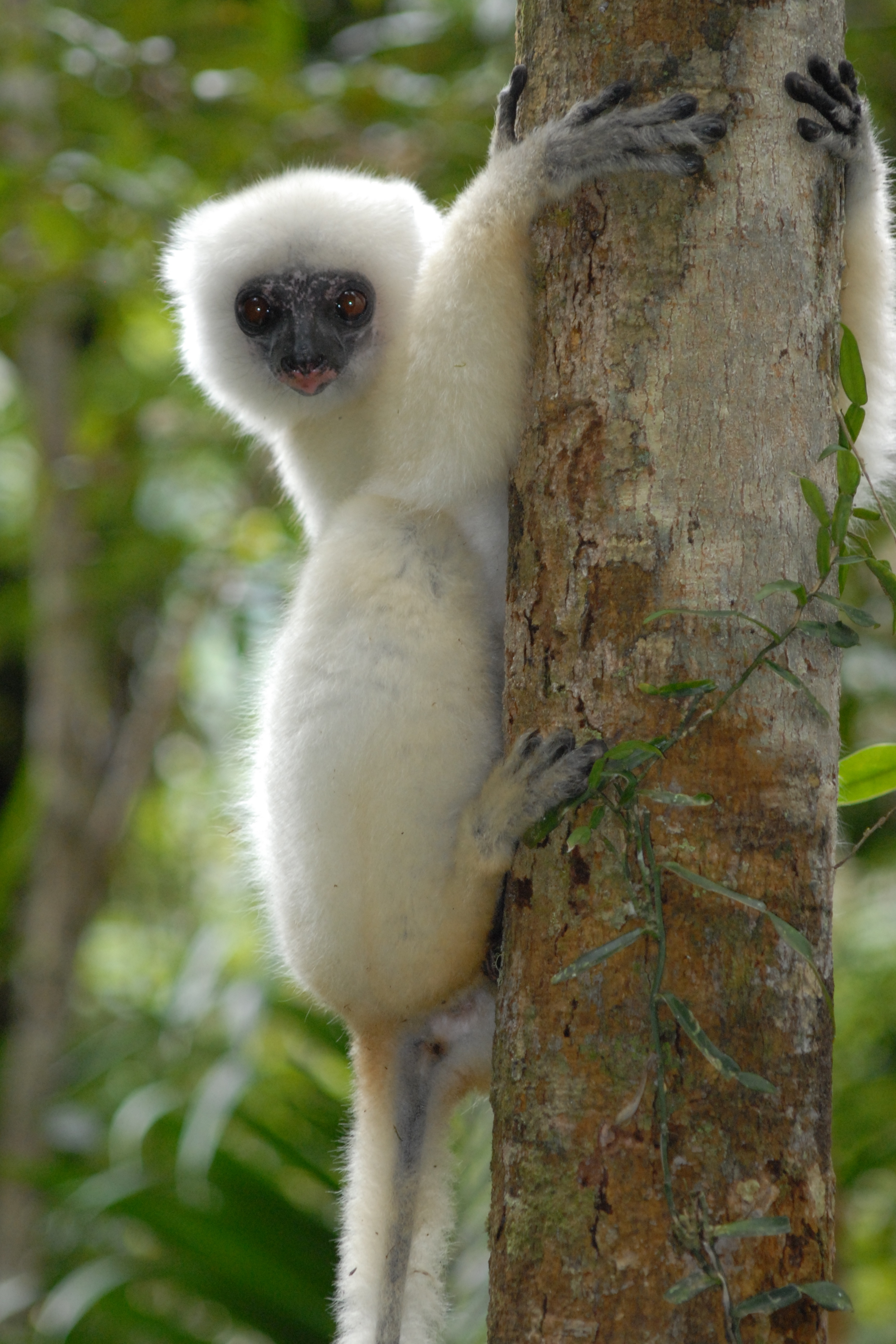

Conservation status
- Critically Endangered (IUCN 3.1)
- CITES Appendix I

Scientific classification
- Kingdom: Animalia
- Phylum: Chordata
- Class: Mammalia
- Infraclass: Placentalia
- Order: Primates
- Suborder: Strepsirrhini
- Family: Indriidae
- Genus: Propithecus
- Species: P. candidus

Binomial name
- Propithecus candidus A. Grandidier, 1871
- Distribution of P. candidus

Synonyms
- P. sericeus Milne-Edwards and A. Grandidier, 1872

= Silky sifaka =

Large species of lemur

The silky sifaka (Propithecus candidus) is a large lemur characterized by long, silky, white fur. It has a very restricted range in northeastern Madagascar, where it is known locally as the simpona. It is one of the rarest mammals on Earth. The silky sifaka is one of nine sifaka species (genus Propithecus), and one of four former subspecies of diademed sifaka (P. diadema). Studies in 2004 and 2007 compared external proportions, genetics, and craniodental anatomy supporting full species status, which has generally been accepted.

The silky sifaka has a variable social structure, and lives in groups of two to nine individuals. It spends most of its day feeding and resting, though it also devotes a considerable amount of time to social behaviors, such as playing and grooming, as well as travelling. Females occasionally take priority over males during feeding. Like other eastern sifakas, it consumes mainly leaves and seeds, but also fruit, flowers, and even soil on occasion. It is a seasonal breeder and only mates one day a year during the start of the rainy season. As with other sifaka species, nonmaternal infant care is common. Group members of all ages and both sexes often groom, play with, occasionally carry, and even nurse infants that are not their own. The silky sifaka vocalizes frequently despite its moderately sized vocal repertoire consisting of seven adult calls. Like all other lemurs, it relies strongly on scent for communication. Males frequently scent-mark on top of scent marks made by other group members, particularly females. Males also gouge trees with their toothcomb (a special arrangement of the bottom, front teeth) prior to chest scent-marking. This chest marking results in males having brown-stained chests, the only visible trait that can be used to distinguish between adult males and adult females.

The species is only found within a few protected areas in the rainforests of northeastern Madagascar, with the majority of the remaining population in Marojejy National Park and Anjanaharibe-Sud Special Reserve. A few groups have also been found in the Makira Forest Protected Area, the Betaolana Corridor, and some unprotected forest fragments. The silky sifaka is hunted throughout its range as no local fady (taboo) exists against eating this species. Habitat disturbance, such as slash-and-burn agriculture (tavy), illegal logging of precious woods (particularly rosewood) and fuel-wood, also occurs within the protected areas where it is found.

== Etymology ==
The name "sifaka" is a reference to a common general alarm vocalization given by western dry forest sifakas in which they emit an explosive, hiss-like "shee-faak" call several times in succession. On the east coast, local residents refer to the larger-bodied diademed sifaka as simpona, a name which refers to the species' sneeze-like "zzuss" alarm vocalizations. The calls are emitted in a variety of stressful circumstances such as presence of humans, falling trees, terrestrial predators, and after aggression between group members. The specific name, candidus, is Latin for "white", while the specific name of the taxonomic synonym sericeus is derived from the Greek word for "silk".

== Taxonomy ==
The silky sifaka was initially described in 1871 by French naturalist Alfred Grandidier in a formally published letter to French zoologist Alphonse Milne-Edwards. Grandidier's description was based on his own observations north of Antongil Bay in the last few months of 1870. He then named the species Propithecus candidus due to its white color, which he likened to that of Verreaux's sifaka (Propithecus verreauxi), but without the dark fur on its head or the ash-colored spot on the back. The first specimen was obtained in 1872 and provided by a "Monsieur Guinet", a planter from Sambava. The specimen allowed both Grandidier and Milne-Edwards to more thoroughly describe the species based on its skin, coat, and skull. Upon those findings, they changed the name to P. sericeus. Upon further review in 1875, Grandidier demoted the silky sifaka to a variety or "race" of the diademed sifaka. By the time German zoologist Ernst Schwarz standardized lemur taxonomy in 1931, P. sericeus had become a taxonomic synonym for the species, with the original name, Propithecus candidus, taking priority.

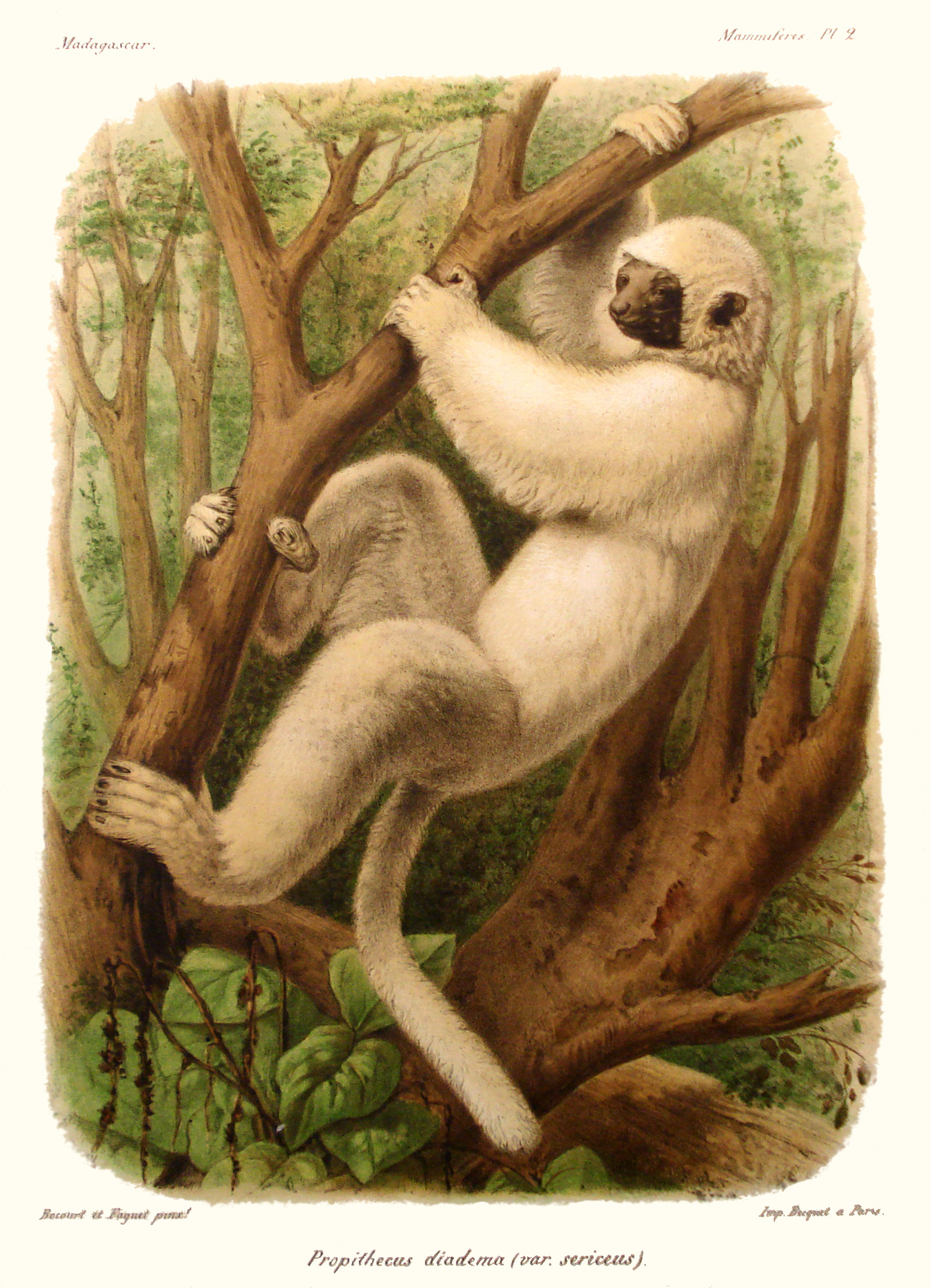
Color print of the silky sifaka from Alfred Grandidier's L'Histoire politique, physique et naturelle de Madagascar (1892)

Schwarz placed all sifakas into two species, the larger diademed sifaka from the eastern rainforests and the smaller Verreaux's sifaka from the dry forests and spiny forests of the west and south. At the time, both species comprised four subspecies, and the silky sifaka was listed as P. diadema candidus, a subspecies of the diademed sifaka. In his 1982 book Primates of Madagascar (book)|Primates of Madagascar, anthropologist Ian Tattersall upheld this classification. When anthropologist Colin Groves reviewed the taxonomy in his book Primate Taxonomy (book)|Primate Taxonomy in 2001, he also upheld the subspecies status of the silky sifaka because variations in fur coloration between the available specimens suggested converging similarities with the diademed sifaka's coloration. Groves later noted that the coloration of the two species did not overlap, suggesting that the populations were distinct.

In 2004, Mayor et al. showed that despite having a similar karyotype (the number and appearance of chromosomes) of 42 chromosomes (2n=42), the silky sifaka was distinct from the diademed sifaka. This was shown through genetic tests (D-loop sequencing) and by comparing external proportions. For example, the silky sifaka has a shorter tail. Their analysis indicated a closer relationship with Perrier's sifaka (Propithecus perrieri). Russell Mittermeier and colleagues followed by adopting the full species status of the silky sifaka for the second edition of Lemurs of Madagascar in 2006. Although Groves maintained the silky sifaka as a subspecies in the 3rd edition of Mammal Species of the World in 2005, he recognized it as a distinct species in 2007 by acknowledging the work of Mayor et al. and also noting the additional distinction that the silky sifaka has relatively long molar teeth compared to the length of its toothrow. Despite the promotion to full species status, the silky sifaka is still considered to be a member of the P. diadema group of four closely related, large-bodied, eastern-rainforest sifakas. The other three members of this group are the diademed sifaka, Perrier's sifaka, and Milne-Edwards' sifaka (Propithecus edwardsi). The species status of the silky sifaka, as well as other sifakas, does not have universal support: in 2007, Tattersall argued against species distinctions within Propithecus, claiming the decisions were made prematurely.

In 1974, Tattersall spotted what he thought was a color variant of the silky sifaka north of Vohemar in northeast Madagascar. Describing it as such eight years later in The Primates of Madagascar, he not only cited its mostly white fur, but also uncharacteristic traits such as a patch of orange on its crown and tufted ears. It was not observed again until 1986, when a team led by paleoanthropologist Elwyn L. Simons captured specimens for captive breeding and identified it as a new species, named as the golden-crowned sifaka (Propithecus tattersalli) in 1988.

== Geographic range and habitat ==
The silky sifaka is confined to a small region of northeastern Madagascar within a strip of humid forest stretching from Maroantsetra in the south to the Andapa Basin and the Marojejy Massif in the north. Marojejy National Park represents the northern limit of its current distribution, although historical sifaka range maps created by Grandidier and Milne-Edwards in the late 19th century show the silky sifaka as far north as the Bemarivo River, north of Sambava. The Androranga River may represent the northwestern range limit within the Tsaratanana Corridor. The southern limit of its range appears to be the Antainambalana River, within the Makira Conservation Site. It is not known if the silky sifaka has ever ranged as far south as the Masoala Peninsula. As of 2009, new observations of a few groups of the silky sifaka in unprotected forest fragments adjacent to northeastern Makira (Antohaka Lava and Maherivaratra) may slightly enlarge the known geographic range of this species. The presence of the silky sifaka has been documented within Marojejy National Park, Anjanaharibe-Sud Special Reserve, the Makira Forest Protected Area, the Betaolana Corridor, and the Tsaratanana Corridor. In 2008, 16 groups were discovered in western Marojejy near Antsahaberoaka.

The silky sifaka tends to be found at higher elevations than any of the other sifaka species and also occupies the greatest range of elevations for the group. In Marojejy National Park and Anjanaharibe-Sud Special Reserve, where most of the remaining groups exist, it is not found below 700 m (2,300 ft) of elevation and not above 1,875 m (6,152 ft). However, at its southernmost location in Makira (Andaparaty), several groups inhabit forest fragments at an unusually low elevation of 300 m (980 ft). The silky sifaka inhabits three types of elevation-specific habitats: primary montane rainforest, sclerophyllous forest, and the most elevated portions of low ericoid bush. How sensitive the silky sifaka is to disturbance or whether it avoids habitat edges ("edge-intolerant") or is more edge-tolerant like the diademed sifakas is unknown. Like other rainforest sifaka species, it seldom crosses unforested regions between forest fragments.

In the Anjanaharibe-Sud Special Reserve, the silky sifaka is shares the same geographic range as the white-fronted brown lemur (Eulemur albifrons) and an all-black population of indri (Indri indri). In Marojejy National Park, it is sympatric with the white-fronted brown lemur. In 2008, the silky sifaka was suggested to be sympatric with the red ruffed lemur (Varecia rubra) near Maherivaratra and Andaparaty.

== Description ==
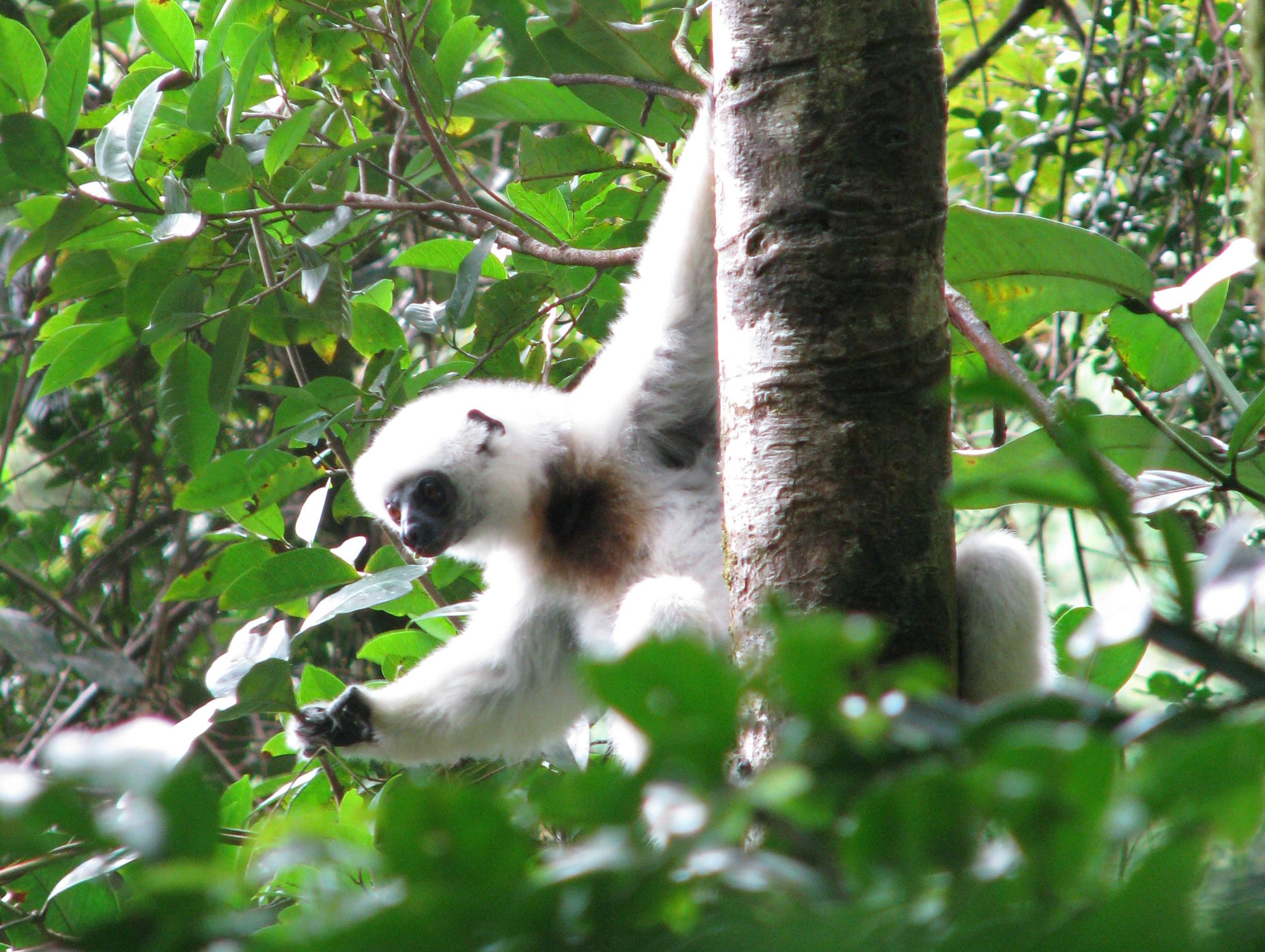

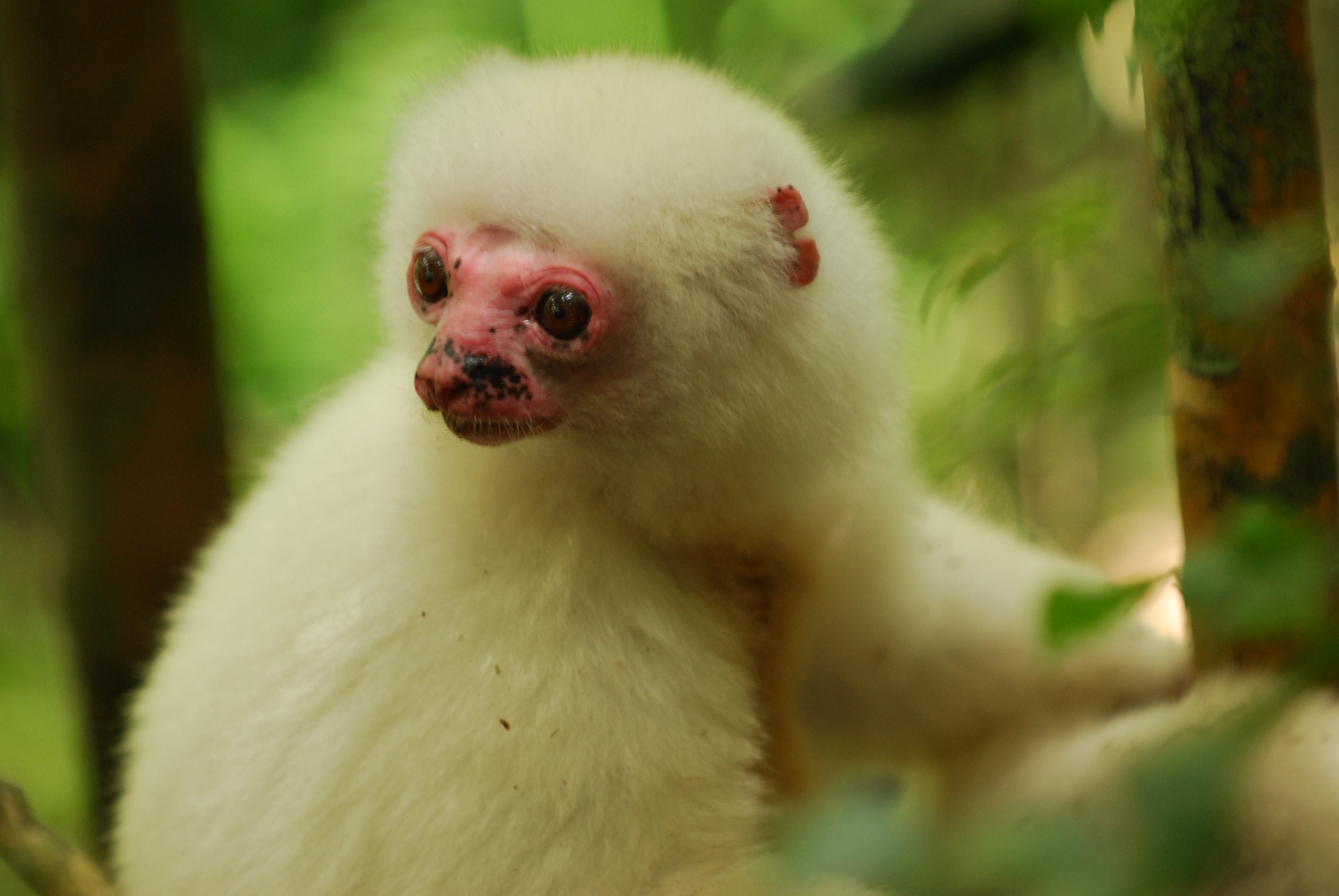
Male silky sifakas have a prominent chest patch due to scent marking (top), and all individuals lose skin pigment with age, leading to totally pink faces in some extreme cases (bottom).

The silky sifaka is one of the largest sifaka species, with a head-body length of 48–54 cm (1.6–1.8 ft), a tail length of 45–51 cm (1.5–1.7 ft), a total length of 93–105 cm (3.1–3.4 ft), and a weight of 5–6.5 kg (11–14 lb). As its common English name suggests, its long, white fur has a silky texture. Not all individuals are completely white: some have silver-gray or black tints on the crown, back, and limbs. The base of the tail ("pygal region") can be yellow. The ears and face are hairless, and the skin may be a mix of pink and black, completely black, or completely pink. The tips of the ears protrude slightly above the fur on the rest of the head. Its eyes have a deep orange-red coloration. Its appearance is distinctive, and since no other sifakas share its range, it is not easily confused with other lemur species.

While it is difficult to distinguish adult males and females in other eastern rainforest sifakas, such as Perrier's sifaka and Milne-Edwards' sifaka, gender in the silky sifaka is easily discerned due to differences in fur coloration of the upper chest. Females have white fur, while males have a large brown patch of fur that results from scent marking with a gland on the chest and throat (the sternal gular gland). During mating season, the size of the "chest patch" increases to cover both the chest and abdomen as a result of increased scent marking.

== Behavior ==
Until the 21st century, brief observations and lemur surveys had merely documented the presence of the silky sifaka in special reserves and national parks. More recently, a 14-month study and two short-term studies in Marojejy National Park have revealed previously unknown details about its behavioral biology, communication, and feeding ecology. The silky sifaka has a variable social structure and is known to live in male-female pairs, one-male groups, and multiple-male/multiple-female groups. Group sizes range from two to nine individuals, while the home ranges are estimated to range from 34 to 47 ha (84 to 116 acres), varying in size by location.

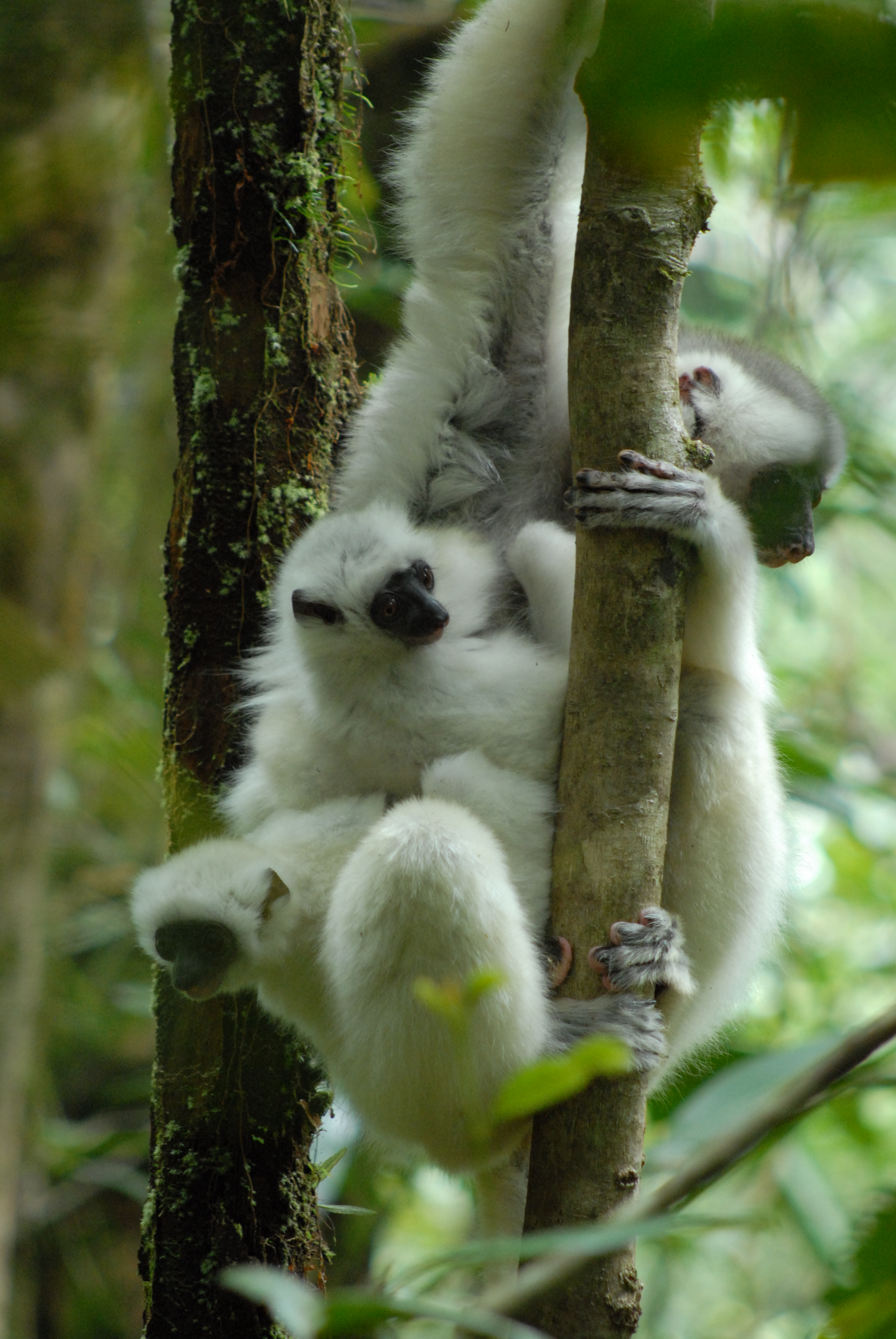
Nonmaternal infant care often occurs in silky sifakas. A mother carrying more than her own infant is rare.

According to some studies, the silky sifaka spends most of its day resting and feeding (about 44 and 25%, respectively). It also devotes approximately 6.8% of the day to social behavior, such as personal grooming, social grooming (allogrooming), and play. The rest of the day is spent traveling and sleeping. Other sources report that the species divides half of the day between traveling and foraging, while the rest is spent resting. Daily foraging usually starts at dawn unless delayed by rain. Group movement is usually led by females, and groups usually travel 700 m (2,300 ft) per day, and may climb 500 m (1,600 ft) along vertical slopes. Although the species spends its time in the trees, terrestrial play is not uncommon, even among adults, with play sessions lasting 30 minutes or more. Like other sifakas, it uses a type of arboreal locomotion known as vertical clinging and leaping. Dominance hierarchies have not been documented among female sifakas, including the silky sifaka, although seasonal hierarchies are known to occur. Aggression, which is generally infrequent, occurs primarily during feeding, where females take priority over males, although submissive signals are not always obvious.

The silky sifaka's diet is similar to that of other eastern rainforest sifakas, consisting primarily of leaves (folivory) and seeds (seed predation). It is highly varied and includes many plant species. A two-month study from the mid-2000s showed that the silky sifaka can feed on as many as 76 species of plant from 42 families. Its favorites included primarily tree species, but also some lianas. The most prominent plant families in the diet were Moraceae (20.30%), Fabaceae (12.87%), Myrtaceae (12.65%), Clusiaceae (10.13%) and Apocynaceae (9.49%). In the study, feeding upon these four plant families took up as much as 37.06% of the total feeding time for the silky sifaka: 16.09% on the fruit of Pachytrophe dimepate, 8.43% on the seeds of Senna spp., 6.52% on the young leaves of Plectaneia thouarsii, and 6.02% on the fruit of Eugenia spp. In sum, folivory accounted for 52% of the feeding time, while fruit-eating accounted for 34%, and seed predation made up 11%. The consumption of flowers, as well as soil (geophagy), was rarely observed in this study. Prior to this, preliminary studies had reported that folivory accounted for 75% of the diet, while fruits and 15% was seed predation, 7% was flower consumption, and bark and soil made up the remainder.

Silky sifaka vocalizations
"Zzuss" vocalization
General purpose alarm call

"Aerial disturbance" roar
Roar given in response to large birds

Chatter squeal
Submissive signal

Howl
Sound made when an individual gets lost

"Hum" vocalization
Contact call

"Mum" vocalization
Another type of contact call

Silky sifakas are known to occasionally eat soil (geophagy).

Although arboreal, silky sifakas sometimes play on the ground.

Like all other lemurs, the silky sifaka is a seasonal breeder, and are thought to mate only one day a year during the start of the rainy season sometime in December or January. Infants are born six months later in June or July. Females typically give birth to a single infant once every two years, although births in consecutive years have been observed. Infants initially cling to the fur of their mother's chest for nearly four weeks and then switch to riding on her back. As with other eastern rainforest sifakas, the infants of this species develop rapidly. This may be due to assistance in the care of infants by all group members (known as alloparental care)—a trait typical among all sifakas. Nonmaternal care usually takes the form of allogrooming, but also playing, occasional carrying, and in rare cases, nursing. The dispersal of offspring is thought to be similar to that of other eastern rainforest sifakas, with both males and females transferring out of the group at sexual maturity. However, dispersal has only been observed once with a young adult male, which left his natal group and proceeded to oust an older male from a group in which he had been a member for seven years. Female dispersal and group transfer has not yet been observed.

The only documented predator of the silky sifaka, other than humans, is the fossa, a cat-like carnivore found only on Madagascar. Although no aerial predators are known, the silky sifaka often watches the sky and emits loud "aerial disturbance" roars at the sight of the large Madagascar buzzard (Buteo brachypterus) and other small birds. Another, more general alarm call is the loud, sneeze-like "zzuss" vocalization, which is emitted in response to terrestrial disturbances, calls from lost group members, and aggression by other group members. Acoustic analyses of the "zzuss" vocalization have shown that the call's acoustic structure differs between individuals and by gender.

Adult eastern sifakas have a moderately sized vocal repertoire of about seven call types. If their vocalizations have specific or varied contexts is uncertain, and as with other primates, arousal level may play a role in the acoustic structure of its calls. Despite the limited size of the silky sifaka's vocal repertoire, it does exhibit high call rates of seven calls per hour, on average. Even infants are known to have several specialized vocalizations. The most frequently emitted silky sifaka vocalizations are low-amplitude, low-frequency, tonal "hum" and "mum" vocalizations. These contact calls are used in a variety of circumstances, including group movement, affiliation, foraging, and while resting.

The silky sifaka uses well-developed olfactory (smell-based) communication, as with all other strepsirrhine primates. Like other eastern rainforest sifakas, it has several specialized glands for scent-marking, including a sebaceous gland on the chest, found only in males, and mixed apocrine-sebaceous glands on the genitals in both sexes. Unlike the true lemurs of the genus Eulemur, the silky sifaka does not directly scent-mark its conspecifics (allomarking), although it does scent-mark its territory. Both sexes will often urinate while scent-marking. Males and females scent-mark in different ways: females rub their genital glands in an up-and-down motion against trees, while males may use their chest gland, genital glands, or a combination of both. Males also use their specialized toothcomb to gouge trees before scent-marking with their chest—a behavior that leaves long-lasting visible marks. The gouging is thought to serve a role in communication and has no dietary component, since males do not eat the bark or tree gum.

Males scent-mark more frequently than females, as much as two or three times as often. Males also respond to female scent-marking by overmarking with their own scent glands, usually by combining chest and genital marking. They also overmark other males, although less quickly and less often. In a one-year study, males responded to 71% of the marks made by females within an average of 61 seconds while only 17% of male marks received a response from other group members. Because males overmark frequently, this results in "totem-tree marking", where certain trees become covered by male scent and gouge marks. However, no observations of widespread home-range border scent-marking have been reported. Scent-marks are usually left on trees in the core area of the home range, as opposed to the territorial boundaries.

== Conservation ==
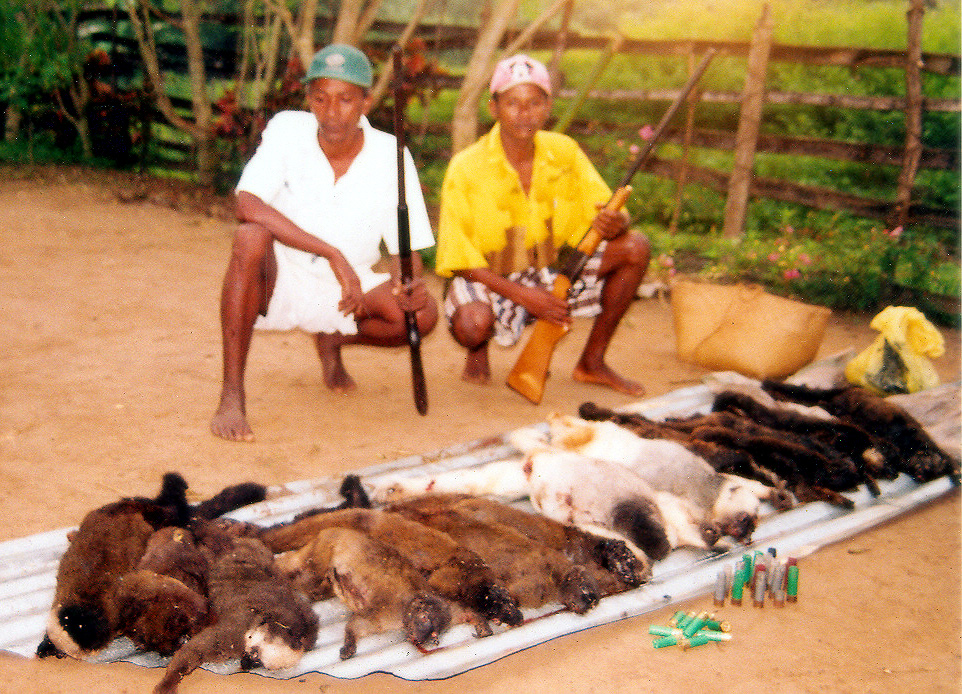
Silky sifakas and other lemur species are hunted within their range.

According to the most recent IUCN Red List assessment, the silky sifaka is critically endangered. It is one of the rarest and most critically endangered lemurs. Its population size is estimated to range between 100 and 1,000 individuals, while the number of mature individuals is thought to be less than 250. No silky sifakas are kept in captivity, such as in zoos.

The silky sifaka is the flagship species for the protected areas in which it is found, particularly for Marojejy, which has recently been inaugurated as part of a World Heritage Site cluster known as the Rainforests of the Atsinanana. Habitat disturbance, such as slash-and-burn agriculture (known locally as tavy), logging of precious woods (e.g., rosewood) and fuel-wood, also occurs within the protected areas where it is found. Unlike the golden-crowned sifaka (Propithecus tattersalli), there is no local taboo (fady) against eating this species, and the hunting of bushmeat is a known issue within its range. It is most heavily hunted in the northern and western parts of Marojejy, as well as other areas around the Andapa Basin. The species is restricted to 90,000 ha (350 sq mi) of protected areas, although this may be an overestimation because in much of its range the silky sifaka is not found below 700 m (2,300 ft) in altitude, possibly due to either hunting pressure or habitat preference.

Illegal logging of precious hardwoods, such as rosewood and ebony, has become one of the greatest threats to the silky sifaka's habitat, especially since the 2009 Malagasy political crisis. Its two largest protected areas, Masoala National Park and Marojejy National Park, have been the hardest hit. The disturbance caused by selective logging increases the likelihood of forest fires, helps invasive species take root, impairs habitat, and causes the loss of genetic diversity.

Local villages adjacent to its remaining protected areas adopted a two-pronged strategy towards silky sifaka conservation education. First, a "cognitive component" was implemented to increase knowledge and awareness through radio interviews, slide presentations, and the disbursement of literature in twelve primary and secondary schools. Additionally, an "emotional component" was begun to link silky sifaka conservation with positive emotional experiences, with the goal of establishing a psychological connection between the children and the lemur. To do this, groups of children were taken on three-day educational eco-tours in Marojejy National Park. Both the teachers and the students showed interest and genuine concern about the plight of the silky sifaka.

Plans are being made to both expand Anjanaharibe-Sud Special Reserve and link existing parks and reserves in the region with wildlife corridors. These corridors include the Betaolana Corridor between Marojejy and Anjananharibe-Sud and Makira, which will connect Anjananharibe-Sud with Masoala National Park to the south. In addition to providing additional habitat for the silky sifaka, the corridors would promote genetic exchange between currently isolated populations.
