= Illegal logging in Madagascar =

Unauthorised trade of timber in Madagascar

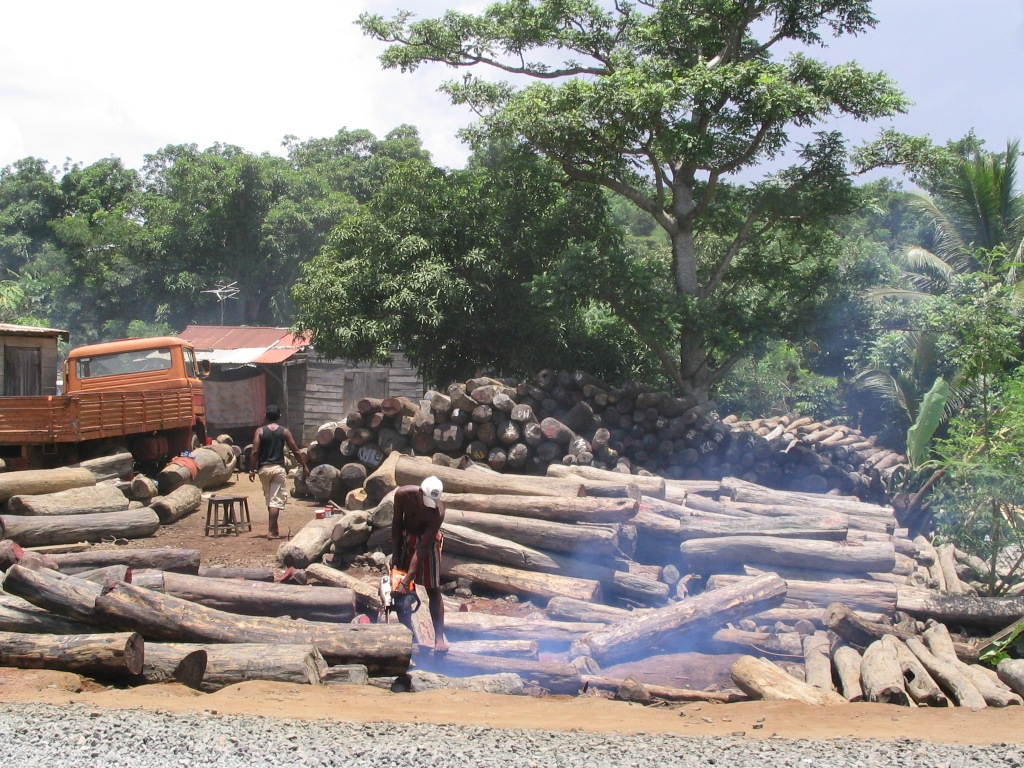
Rosewood is illegally logged from Masoala and Marojejy national parks, with the heaviest exploitation occurring after the 2009 political crisis.

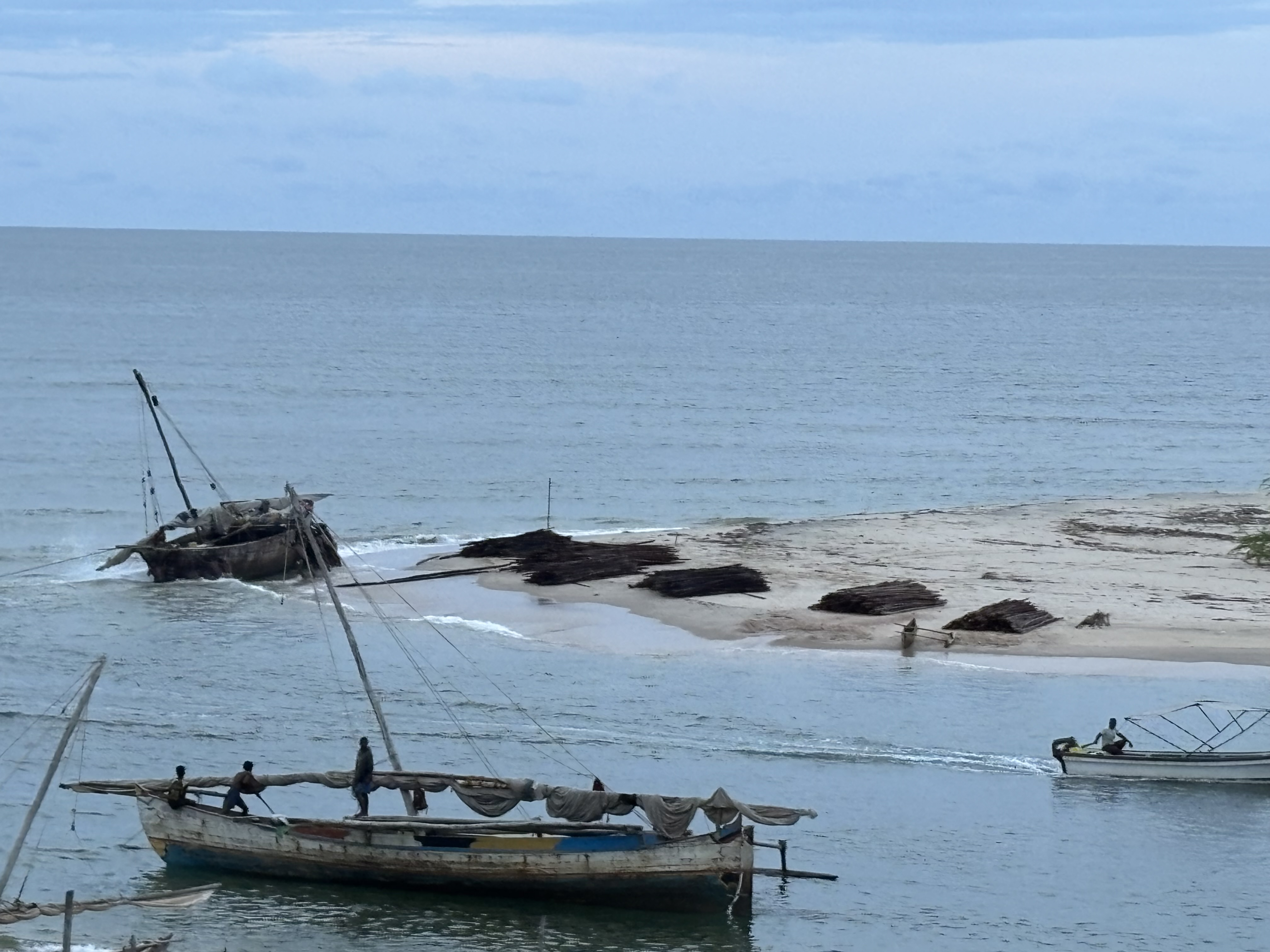
Smugglers in Mahajanga push a smuggling ship, with piles of illegal mangrove logs on the beach behind them

Illegal logging has been a problem in Madagascar for decades and is perpetuated by extreme poverty and government corruption. Often taking the form of selective logging, the trade has been driven by high international demand for expensive, fine-grained lumber such as rosewood and ebony. Historically, logging and exporting in Madagascar have been regulated by the Malagasy government, although the logging of rare hardwoods was explicitly banned from protected areas in 2000. Since then, government orders and memos have intermittently alternated between permitting and banning exports of precious woods. The most commonly cited reason for permitting exports is to salvage valuable wood from cyclone damage, although this reasoning has come under heavy scrutiny. This oscillating availability of Malagasy rosewood and other precious woods has created a market of rising and falling prices, allowing traders or "timber barons" to stockpile illegally sourced logs during periodic bans and then flood the market when the trade windows open and prices are high. Over 350,000 trees were illegally felled in Madagascar between 2010 and 2015, according to TRAFFIC.

== History ==
Being characterized by dilapidated infrastructure and inadequate health care and education systems, Madagascar is one of the poorest countries in the world. With a lack of jobs being created by the formal economy, a large informal economy has developed to accommodate. One of the most significant components of this economy has been illegal logging, particularly of the valuable, dense, hardwoods known as rosewood and ebony.

Rosewood (of the family Leguminosae) generally has a deep, lustrous red coloration, whereas ebony (of the family Ebenaceae) has a dark, heavy fine wood grain. Malagasy rosewoods include Dalbergia baronii, D. louvelii, and the "palissandre wood" D. madagascariensis (which lacks the distinctive red coloration). These rare, endemic species are mainly found in the SAVA Region and the Makira-Masoala Landscape of Madagascar. Although rosewood species from other countries have traditionally been used for high-class musical instruments and furniture, these sources have been depleted, leaving Madagascar as one of the leading sources. Ebony, on the other hand, belongs to the large mostly tropical genus Diospyros. The rare, endemic ebony species of Madagascar grow primarily in the northwestern part of Madagascar, but some also grow in Marojejy and Masoala national parks. Both species are slow growing, and take as much as 300 years or more to reach maturity.

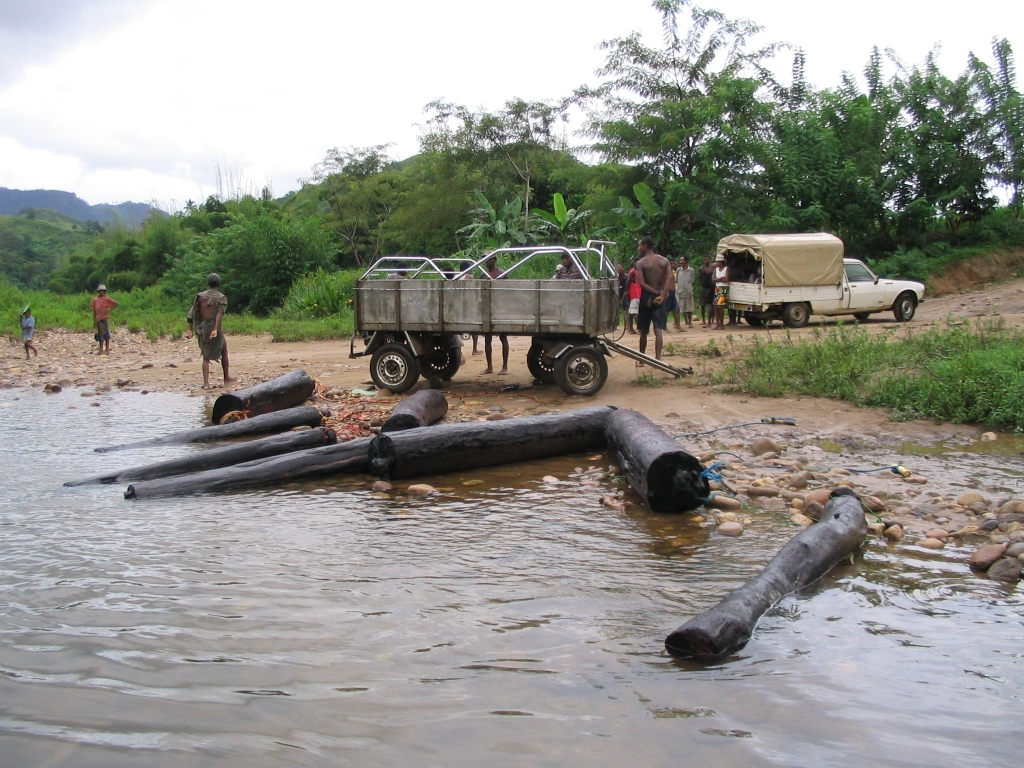
Rosewood removed from Marojejy National Park by waterway in 2005

The use of these rare hardwoods by local people is limited and sustainable, unlike the unsustainable exploitation from illegal and government-approved logging for international markets. The logging of rosewoods and ebonies in Madagascar can be traced back more than twenty years prior to the 2009 Malagasy political crisis. Until recently, the island's forests had not experienced the levels of intense logging seen in countries like Malaysia or Indonesia due to its smaller trees, challenging terrain, and national policies favoring locally controlled, small-scale operations. Forestry laws have been in place since at least the 1960s, and commercial logging has been regulated by the state. For decades, artisanal loggers have extracted high-value trees from most remaining forests on the island. Between 1974 and 1980, logging was permitted in the northern section of the Zombitse protected area. In the 1970s, a logging company received permission from the state to selectively harvest precious hardwoods from Ihera Classified Forest, which continued legally until all trees of commercially valuable size had become rare. However, illegal logging began when local leaders manipulated the remaining loggers to continue the extracting on a smaller scale for their own benefit.

The unauthorized logging of these precious woods was banned from sensitive regions (such as national parks) and their adjoining areas in November 2000 with the passing of Order 12704/2000. The law was subsequently amended repeatedly, with orders and memorandums oscillating between permission and bans for the export of logs, semi-finished wood (i.e. planks), and/or finished wood (i.e. furniture), and one, Inter-ministerial Order 16030/2006 (September 2006), reiterating the explicit ban on logging. Conservation groups challenged that none of these held precedence over the original order in 2000, but merely "lend a pretext of legality" to the export of illegally logged precious woods, and view all recent logging and exports as criminal offenses. So far, operators have only been fined, wood has rarely been confiscated, exports have been permitted, and logging has accelerated, especially near the end of the decade.

Hardwoods are still being harvested from protected areas across the island and exported from most of Madagascar's ports. The most significant activity has been occurring in the SAVA Region, and particularly in Masoala National Park and the eastern and northeastern portions of Marojejy National Park—both part of the Rainforests of the Atsinanana, a World Heritage Site. The terrain in both parks is very rugged, and with only one park ranger per 100 square kilometers (39 sq mi), it is impossible to fend off the loggers. The parks are being targeted because all the rare rosewoods and ebonies outside of Masoala and Marojejy national parks have already been logged.

Thousands of workers may be involved in the logging and transporting, especially since the 2009 political crisis, yet the logging and export is orchestrated by only a few dozen powerful "Timber Barons," a group of exporters who are some of the wealthiest Malagasy citizens and therefore strongly influence regional and national politics. These include, but are not limited to:

- Jeannot Ranjanoro, president of the National Group of Vanilla Exporters
- Eugene Sam Som Miock, Madagascar's largest lychee exporter
- Jean Paul Rakoto, who has ties to former President Didier Ratsiraka
- Martin Bematana, a former member of parliament
- Christian Claude Bezokiny, owner of the Hôtel Hazovola in Antalaha

These exporters are supplied by a regional network of collectors and sub collectors, which procures the wood and transports it from the protected forests to the nearest major port, all through the paid labor of teams of young local men who receive between 5,000 and 10,000 ariary, or around US$2.50 to $5.00 per day. This income, which is sometimes not paid, is equivalent to less than 2% of the export value of the 200–900 kg (440–1,980 lb) logs they cut and transport. A report by the Environmental Investigation Agency (EIA) and Global Witness estimated that 200 rosewood trees were being cut down a day in 2009. With prices at around $3000 per cubic meter or $11 per kilogram, the wood was worth nearly ten times as much as oak or maple.

The work is done with hand axes and rope, often in remote corners of the forest. The trees are felled and cut into 1–2 metres (3.3–6.6 ft) logs, or bola-bola, and dragged for miles to the nearest river, where they are tied into bundles and floated downstream on rafts made of four or five lighter logs. From there, they are transported by truck to a nearby port, such as Antalaha and Vohémar. The work is strenuous and very dangerous. Once out of the parks, the logs are transported to open yards or hidden locations in and around Antalaha and Vohémar. Sometimes logs are hidden beneath vanilla or buried under gardens, houses, beaches, or in riverbeds. In October 2009, a cache of rosewood was discovered during a raid of Tiko headquarters, a company owned by former president Marc Ravalomanana.

Local poverty and the extremely high value of rosewood have driven the local people to violate their local fady (taboos), by cutting down these trees they hold to be sacred. The deputy director of Prevention at the Independent Anti-Corruption Office (BIANCO) cites the sharp fall of vanilla prices in mid-2008 (the local cash crop fell from $230 per kilo to $25 per kilo between 2003 and 2005.), the cutting of conservation funding following the political coup in January 2009, and an increased interest in rosewood from mostly Chinese buyers as major factors behind the explosive surge in illegal harvesting of rosewoods. He reported that before this, in 2008, the illegal logging and export of rosewood had been halted.

Illegal rosewood stockpiles in and around Antalaha and Vohémar
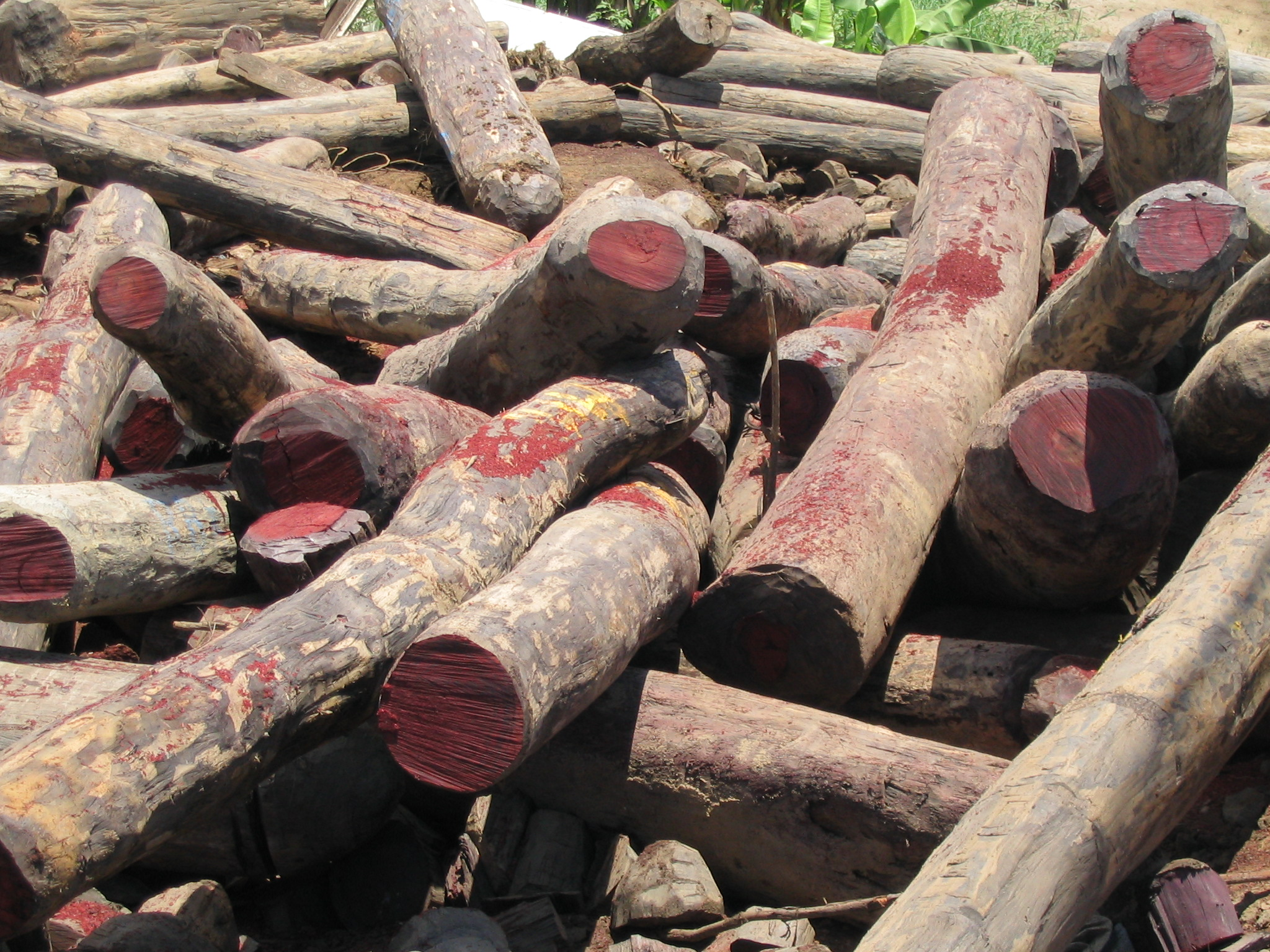
Stockpile in Antalaha (2005)

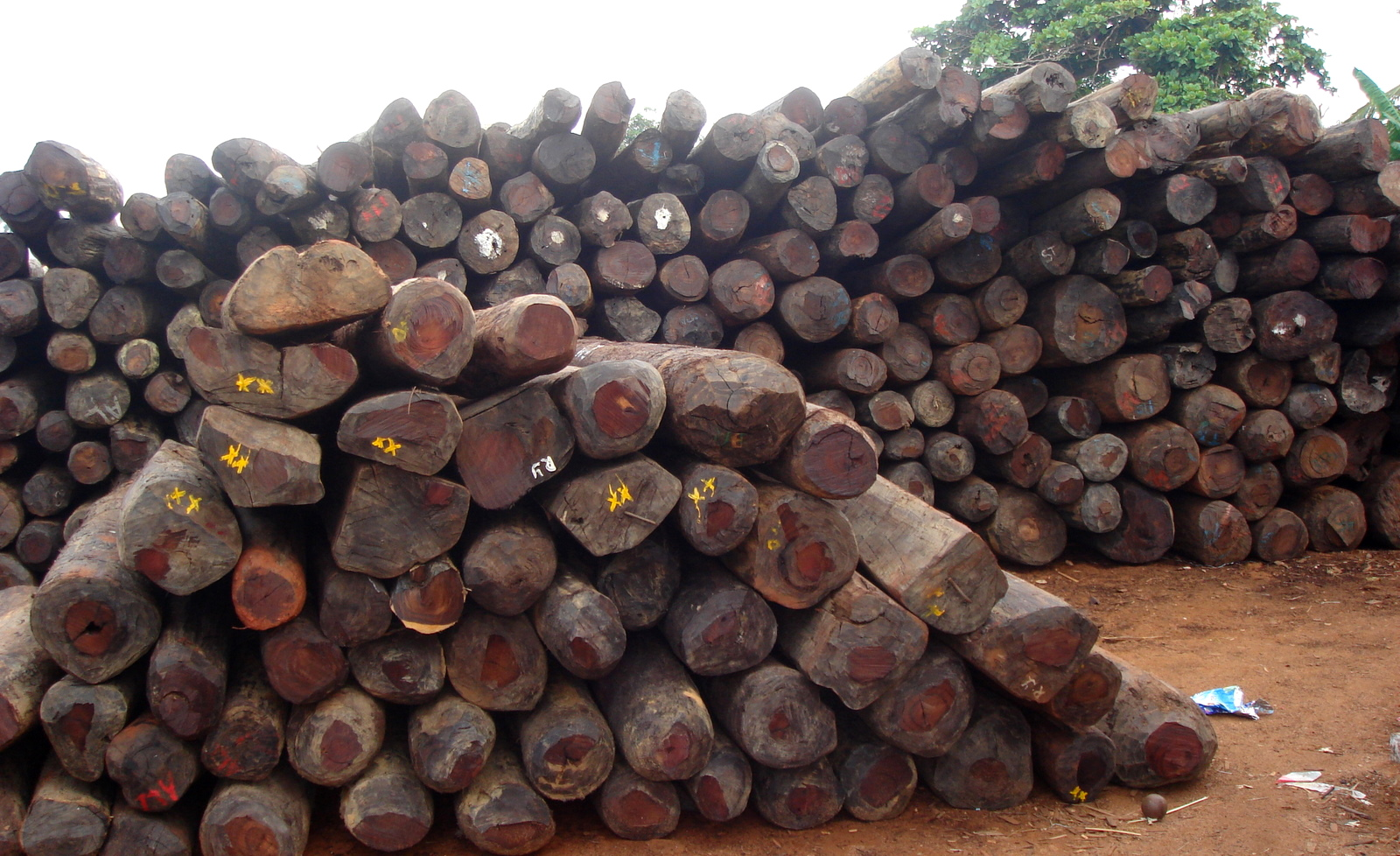
Stockpile in Antalaha (2007)

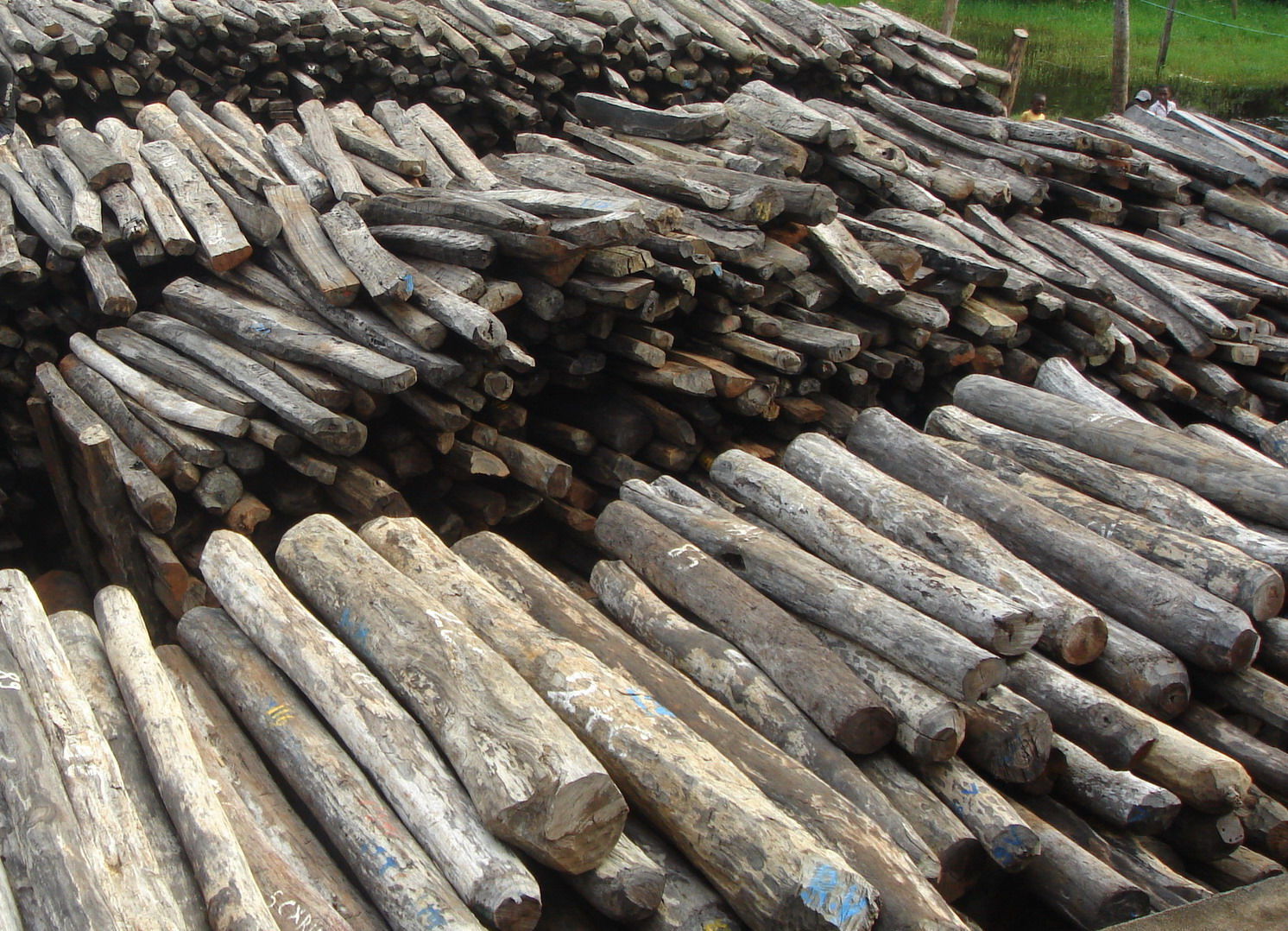
Stockpile in Antalaha (2008)

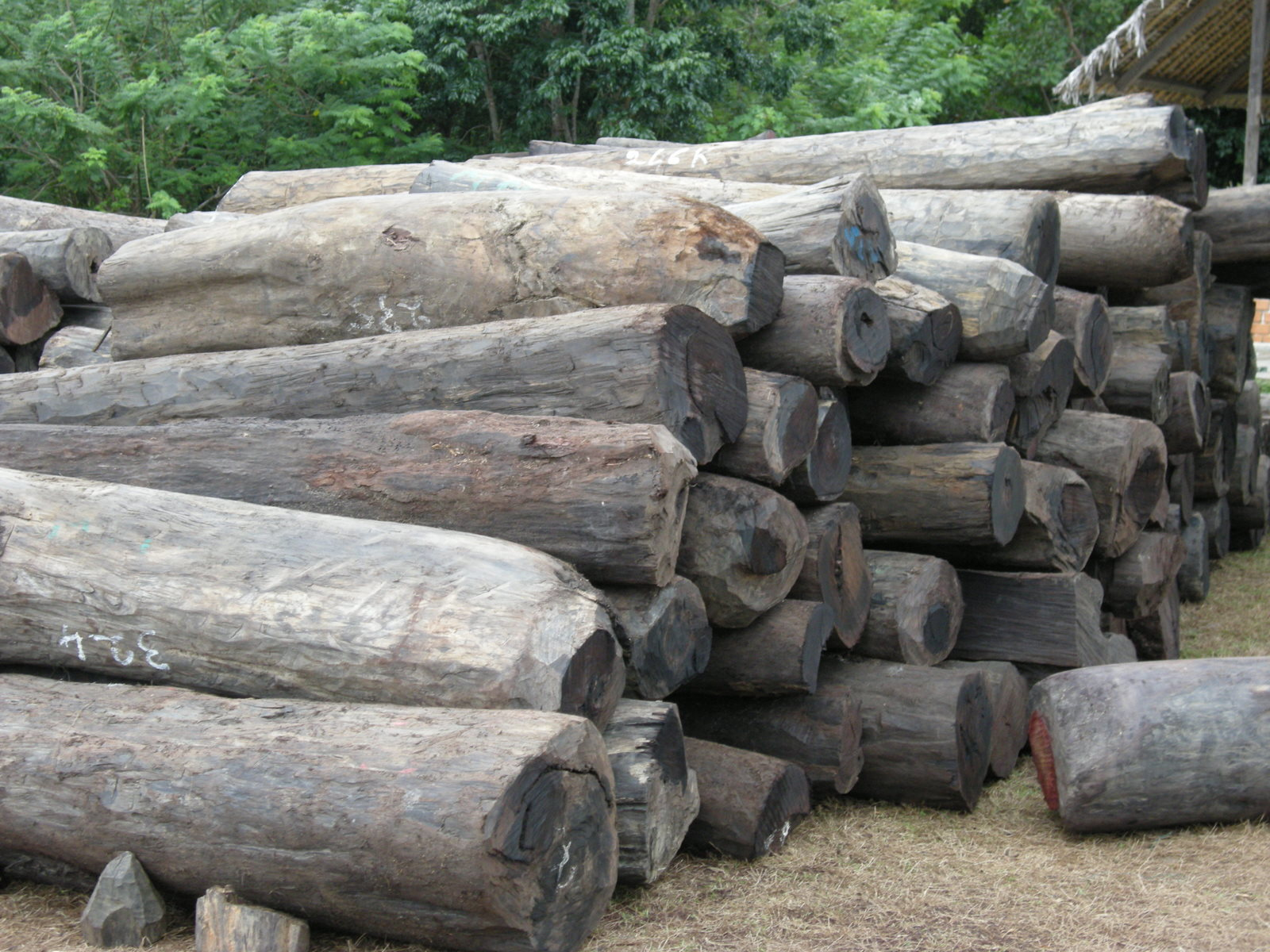
Stockpile in Antalaha (2009)

=== Cyclical exports and cyclone damage ===
Following the bans in 2000 and 2006, exports were restricted to finished or semi-finished products, such as handicrafts. However, exceptions have been made following cyclones that frequently ravage the island's east coast. The export of trees felled by cyclones is permitted, opening a loophole since the government never inventories downed trees. Thus, the timber barons export logs that have been harvested previously, claiming they were a result of storm damage—a technique historically employed by loggers in the United States and elsewhere. The high density of rosewood prevents them from blowing over in cyclones, leading environmental activists to believe the only purpose is to facilitate illegal logging.

Inter-ministerial Order 17939/2004 was passed in September 2004, following Cyclone Gafilo in March, which cleared the way for export of new and existing stocks of rosewood as "salvage." This created anarchy in the national parks in the SAVA Region, with loggers extracting a large amounts of rosewood and ebony, grossly disproportionate to the amount of damage caused by the cyclone. During this time, Marojejy National Park reported that with the granting of export rights, logging in the park had resumed. It wasn't until 2006, with the passing of Inter-ministerial Order 16030/2006, that the export ban was reinstated, nearly two years after the storm, but not before the exporters lobbied the government for an extension "following the grievances expressed by operators" in October 2005, per Memorandum 923/05. Exports were also authorized following cyclones in 2006 and 2007, encouraging the stockpiling of large quantities of lumber in both legal depots and hidden caches around the ports of Vohémar and Antalaha.

These oscillating bans and authorizations for export have created wave-like market of rising and falling prices for rosewood. During times of stricter control, prices rise considerably while illegally harvested wood is stockpiled in anticipation of future authorizations. When restrictions are removed, large quantities of rosewood are dumped on the market, bringing massive profits for traders before causing a rapid fall in prices. During the intervals between exports, the wood traders, who are also vanilla traders, use the relatively steady income from vanilla exports to fund the extraction of the illegal wood.

Cyclones have precipitated illegal rosewood logging in other ways. When Cyclone Hudah hit the island in April 2000, affecting 50,000 people, it exacerbated local poverty. Its devastating effects, later coupled with the downturn in the vanilla market, drove the local people to increase their slash and burn agriculture (called tavy), the use of bushmeat, and the logging of precious hardwoods.

== Effects of the 2009 political crisis ==
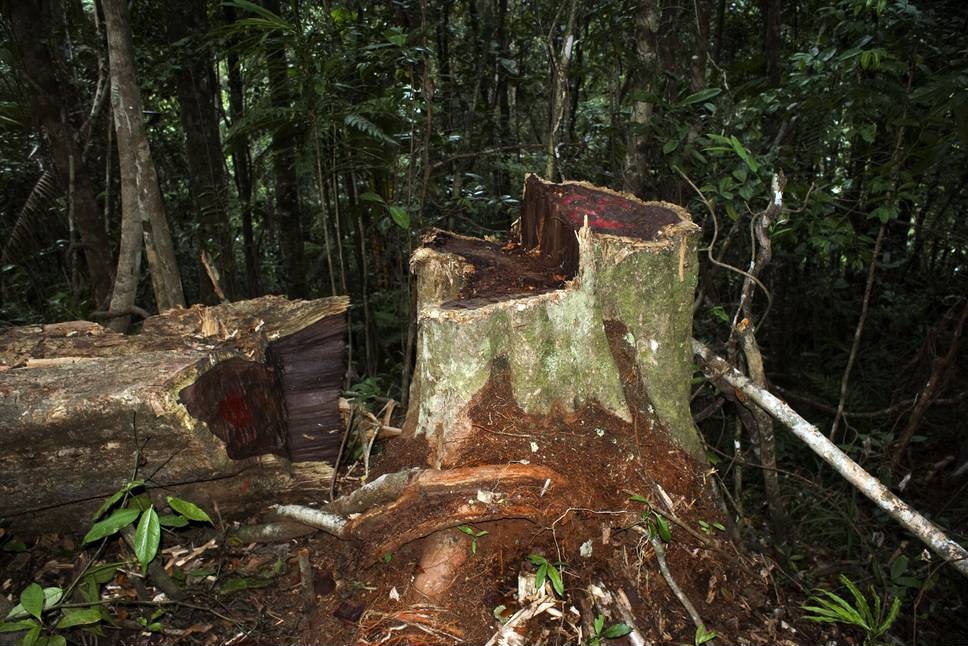
Stump of illegally logged rosewood from Marojejy National Park, Madagascar

In late January 2009, increasing political protests led by the mayor of Antananarivo Andry Rajoelina destabilized the Malagasy government. With the backing of the military, former President Ravalomanana was removed from office on March 18, and power was handed power over to Rajoelina, making him the President of the High Transitional Authority of Madagascar. This drew sharp criticism from the international community and resulted in a sharp cut in foreign assistance from donor countries. Foreign embassies also discouraged their citizens from visiting the country, causing a sharp drop in ecotourism—a critical part of the economy. Coupled with a recent crash in vanilla prices, this has left an already impoverished Malagasy government and economy in an even more desperate state, especially since communities living within the vicinity of the national parks receive half of the park entrance fees. This set the stage for profitable, illegal activities. To meet the surge in demand for Malagasy rosewood, illegal logging of rosewood surged in the SAVA Region, or northeast corner of the island, including Marojejy and Masoala national parks, starting around the time of the first political protests.

On January 19, just before the beginning of the riots, the export of precious woods, which had been stockpiled for the past two years, was once again allowed. This permitted the sale of 500,000 logs of rosewood, ebony, and palisandre, along with many more logs that appeared from hidden caches, thus increasing the pressure for renewed logging. When riots and looting broke out in Antalaha on January 27 and 28, the rosewood mafia recovered an estimated 500 metric tons (500,000 kg) of previously seized logs from the Water and Forests Headquarters. Armed militia backed by foreign profiteers (primarily from China) descended on local villages and began soliciting workers for logging, issuing death threats for villages who opposed them. As a result, the people who had once relied on tourism were left with no other means of support, dividing the community and families. Some turned to the rosewood trade out of desperation, while others who feared prosecution for directly participating in logging instead acted as guides by helping the loggers find the trees.

By March 2009, the national parks of the SAVA Region were swarming with thousands of loggers. This period of intense logging lasted six to eight weeks, and park rangers and guides were forced by armed gangs to abandon their posts, resulting in the closure of Marojejy National Park for over a month, from March 20 to May 11. By early April, the roads leading from the parks were streaked with red from rosewood logs that had been dragged across the pavement. In late March, a representative of the Ministry of Environment, Water and Forestry for the new government met with NGOs concerned with conservation and declared that stopping illegal logging was a top priority. He proposed the following action plan:

1. Send gendarmerie to the region as reinforcements for forest control
2. Use a radio and print campaign to remind people that logging in protected areas is illegal
3. Ceases export at Vohemar (the primary export location for illegal wood) and assess exports more closely
4. Annul the permissions for export given in January
5. Check the visa status of foreign traders in the regions plagued by illegal logging
6. Replace the head of the Directorate General of Waters and Forests
7. Police the radio calls promoting logging in the parks

However, if any of these actions were taken by the cash-strapped central government, they met only limited success. In fact, all attempts by the transitional authority to implement control over trade have had little effect.

Between March and mid-July, authorities in Masoala National Park found a total of 23 stumps, 2,906 logs, 142 logging camps, and over 130 workers within the park. (Few stumps were found because these rare trees are found at low densities—up to 5 trees per hectare, whereas workers, camps, and logs can be found concentrated along paths cut into the forest.) With an estimated 100 to 200 rosewood trees cut per day during peak harvesting in Masoala and the Mananara Biosphere Reserve, between 23,325 and 46,650 trees were cut in Marojejy and northern Masoala while 7,500 to 15,550 trees were cut in Makira and southern Masoala during 2009. Within the SAVA Region, 27,000 to 40,000 acres (11,000 to 16,000 ha) were affected.

It is estimated that $460,000 of rosewood and ebony were harvested per day in 2009, yielding 1,137 containers, or more 24,560 tons, of exported wood worth over $200 million for the year. In Vohémar alone, more than 625 containers of precious wood worth approximately $130 million were exported in 2009. In late April alone, 500 containers of wood harvested from protected areas were exported to China.

As of February 2010, there had been no shipments of precious wood since December 3, 2009. An estimated 15,700 tons of wood, valued at over $100 million, exist in stockpiles awaiting the next export window. Meanwhile, stocks continue to increase as logging in restricted areas continues.

The looting of these forests is well organized and well funded, placing it beyond the regulatory abilities and monitoring of park agents. Workers have been recruited by radio advertisements, the cargo boats of nearby Maroantsetra have all been hired out (to the exclusion of conventional shipping), a 6 km (3.7 mi) road has been built into a remote park in the north, and a flotilla of small boats has been bypassing ports by landing anywhere on the 5,000 km (3,100 mi) of wild coastline to collect wood. In July 2009, investigation teams observed large-scale transport of rosewood logged from national parks in broad daylight along roads policed by posted gendarmerie around Antalaha, demonstrating that these timber traffickers have bribed not only customs officers but also the local law enforcement. This was after a mid-April attempt by the government to increase law enforcement in the parks and toughen enforcement on the export ban. Illegal activities declined during this time, particularly in areas under closer scrutiny, but also increased activities in remote areas.

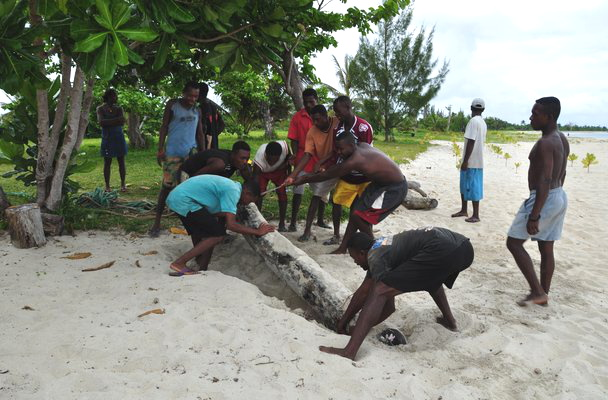
Malagasy laborers work to conceal rosewood illegally harvested from Masoala National Park by burying it at a beach near Cap Est

A few other developments around that time hampered the illegal logging. Shortly before the increased enforcement began in April, about 500 workers gathered in Antalaha, threatening to burn the homes of the rosewood collectors due to continued withholding of their salary. By June, thousands of logs from approximately 20,000 trees had been confiscated in the north-eastern ports of Vohémar and Antalaha. However, the economic and political circumstances that were fueling the looting had not changed, allowing illegal logging to continue and driving even the impoverished gangs of Malagasy loggers to accept partial payments for their labor.

Eleven environmental organizations condemned the logging in March and later identified the withholding of international aid due to the political crisis as one of the most significant problems fueling these illegal activities. In particular, frozen funds from World Bank and United States Agency for International Development (USAID) support capacity building for the national parks, the implementation of chain of custody and tracking for logging, and general funding of the Ministry of Environment and Forests (MEF). In all 70% of the government's operating budget was funded by foreign aid prior to the political turmoil. Since the funding was cut, the government has been strangled by a severe lack of funds, leaving the MEF, for instance, restricted to 10% of its normal budget. Despite pleas from conservation organizations, aid agencies have stood firm on the withholding of aid, arguing that it is the only way send a clear message to the current government that their actions are illegal and disruptive to business relations as well as to pressure them into holding new elections.

An alternative view turns the connection between illegal logging and the 2009 political crisis around completely. Instead of the crippling of the government sparking the illegal logging, the drive to exploit valuable resources on public land may have helped drive the political upheaval, especially since these illicit activities have been problems for decades. If members of Madagascar's higher echelons cannot benefit from this highly profitable trade, it could encourage political change.

=== Corruption and violence ===
Government corruption in Madagascar has been a problem for more than a decade. Transparency International has rated the country between a 1.7 and a 3.4 on its 10-point Corruption Perceptions Index (CPI), with a score less than 3.0 indicating rampant corruption. With the political disturbance in 2009, Madagascar fell from a 3.4 to a 3.0, and suffered a slide in rank from 85 out of 180 countries to a rank of 99.

This downward trend has been demonstrated by the conflicts between various agencies and levels of government. This has allowed wood traders to shop for export clearance among the authorities that regulate it. As a result of this bribery to open periodic trade windows, large-scale exports of illegal precious woods clear customs without much difficulty. Because of the incredibly lucrative nature of recent trades, reports have indicated that government officials have significantly increased the price of export certificates to make more money for themselves. This however has not stopped exporters from re-using single-use export certificates for two or three containers of rosewood. Furthermore, some of the certificates and authorizations from various government agencies bear titles found nowhere in any legal text, such as permis de ramassage and permis de carbonisation (collection permit and carbonization permit respectively). Such authorizations are not supported by and clearly conflict with Malagasy law.

Even when the government has attempted to enforce its own laws, bribery has influenced the outcome. A good example occurred on April 20, 2009, when the port in Vohémar reopened two days after authorities closed it down due to international protests over uncontrolled illegal logging. On the same day as the re-opening, loggers that had previously been arrested were released. One day prior, on April 19, prominent timber barons allegedly flew to the capital city by private plane and met with a senior government official. Another example is when a Malagasy court acquitted timber barons because "the relevant Forestry Administration official had not properly complied with forest control regulations." In other words, because the Forestry Administration had been bribed, the timber barons were cleared of charges.

In many cases, the actions of the criminal syndicates have been direct or even violent. Radio stations have been used to recruit civilians for logging, and on April 20, one person promoted the logging of rosewood in the name of democracy, spawning the resumption of logging in the region. Park rangers and guides at Marojejy National Park were forced away from their posts at gunpoint resulting in the closing of the park in April, and the MEF's regional offices were set on fire and its staff were intimidated. Violent attacks on park staff were documented in August 2009 at Mananara Biosphere Reserve and Masoala National Park, and politicians that have stood up against illegal logging have also faced violent threats or worse. Villagers have lived in fear of the rosewood mafia, silenced and in dire poverty, while people in the coastal city of Sambava demonstrated in strong support of the logging. When remote villagers joined to protest the destruction of their forests, the armed mafia dispersed them by firing shots over their heads. Throughout the region, local communities that opposed illegal logging lived in fear of retaliation since some informants have received death threats. This has made publicizing the situation very difficult.

At the national level, there seems to be only nominal resolve to halt illegal logging. Even the former administrations and members of parliament have been implicated in illegal logging. Given the lack of government funding, the transitional government appears to have little choice but to take money from one of the only profitable industries in the country. Even if the central government wanted to halt the illegal logging and export, they would be hamstrung by decentralization and a lack of funds, leaving them unable to deal with corrupt provincial bureaucrats.

In some ways, illegal actions need to be permitted to combat them. For example, twice in 2009 ministerial orders permitted the export of rosewood and ebony, but only if traders were willing to pay a fine of 72 million ariary, or $35,500, per container of illegally harvested wood. Malagasy law calls for the confiscation of illegal wood, not fines. Furthermore, these ministerial orders do not hold legal precedence over Malagasy law. However, the money from these fines will be used to fund the task force that will attempt to combat illegal logging.

There are some signs that the situation may be starting to change, as conservation groups and the media spotlight have pressured the government to fire some local officials for participating in illegal exports and send gendarmerie to increase surveillance in part of the SAVA region. They have also promised to more closely monitor the exports that they have temporarily approved.

=== Role of the international market ===
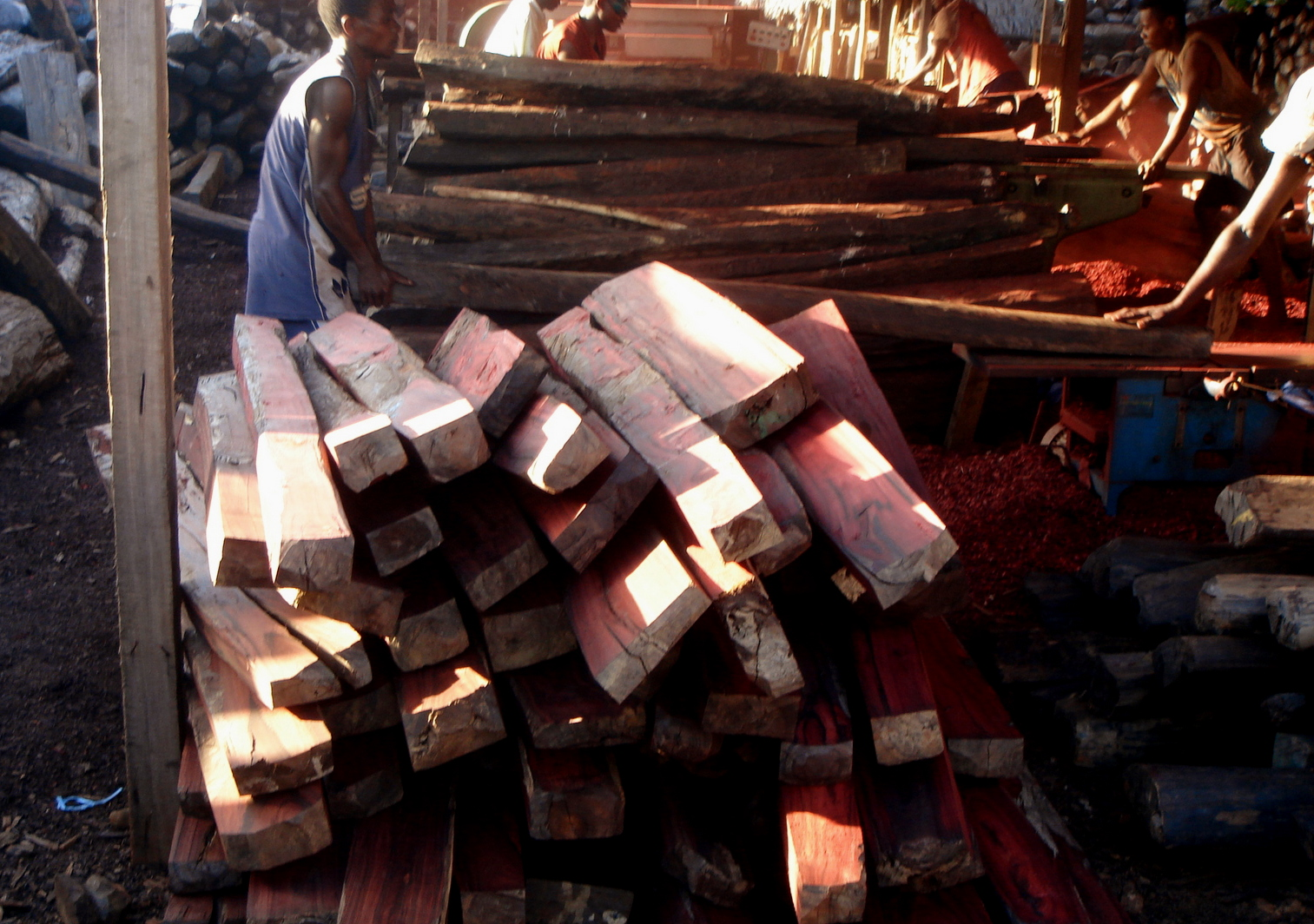
Near the port city of Antalaha, workers process illegally cut rosewood by turning it into planks, which is considered "semi-finished form"

Although timber barons orchestrate the illicit operations, including export, their operations are financed by international sources. This financing comes in the form of down payments of up to half the total sale from foreign buyers and loans from international banks that have branches in Antananarivo. The loans are critical, even in such a profitable industry, because without full payment, most of the capital gets tied up in the stockpiles of logs waiting to be exported.

More than two-thirds (11 out of 15) of the major timber barons have received loans from the Bank of Africa Madagascar while the two most important timber barons have received loans from BFV Société Générale, according to cargo manifests from ports in the SAVA Region. In all, 55% of the loans were made by the Bank of Madagascar, while 45% were made by Société Générale. Local reports have also indicated that Crédit Lyonnais was also involved in giving loans.

Over the course of the political crisis, six nations (in conjunction with the World Bank and three conservation organizations) have called for a stop to this illegal logging in the national parks and other protected areas. Ironically, many of these same governments have either directly or indirectly helped finance these illicit acts through their investments. France, the Netherlands, and Morocco, as well as the World Bank, have been identified as having directly funded these activities. The Bank of Africa is partly owned by France (through the Agence Française du Développement), the World Bank's International Finance Corporation (IFC), Netherlands Development Finance Company (FMO), and Banque Marocaine du Commerce Extérieur (BMCE Bank) in Morocco. Also, Société Générale and Crédit Lyonnais are both partly owned by the French government. Most other western governments are significant shareholders in these banks, thus helping channel foreign investment money into this informal economy. Despite this, these governments and banks have not faced the same level of scrutiny from the public as the shipping companies have. However, as of February 2010, the organized trafficking of illegal wood is being investigated by SAMIFIN (the Malagasy Financial Intelligence Services), which is starting to make these international financial organizations reluctant to participate.

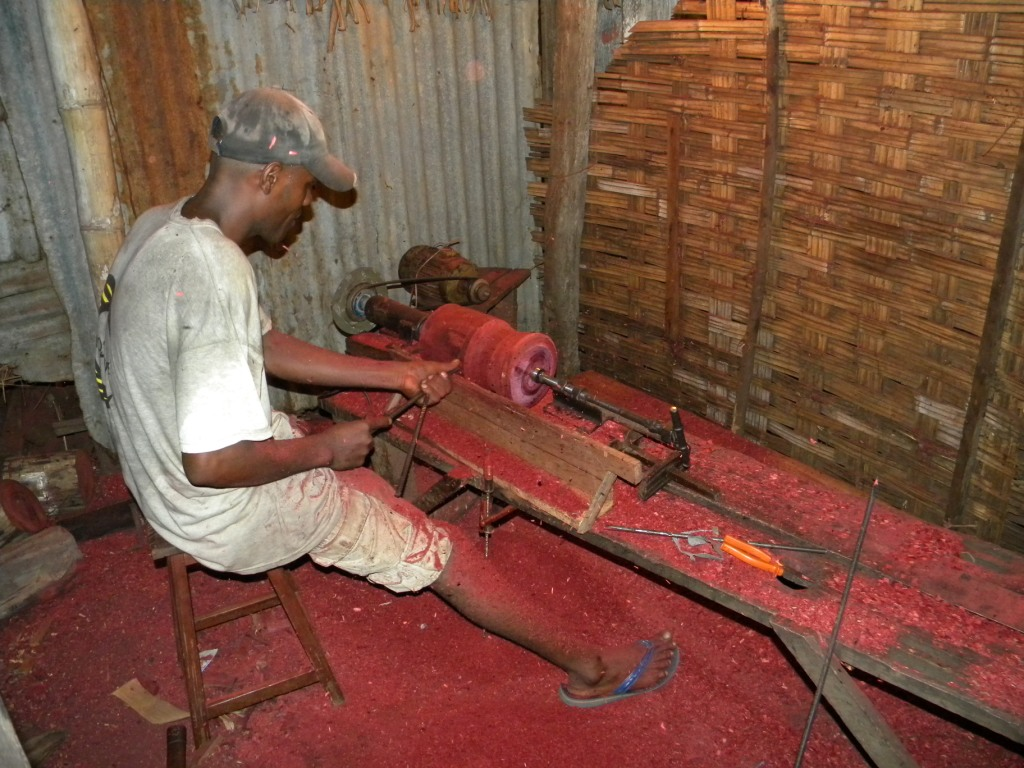
At a rosewood vase factory in Antalaha, an artisan produces an example of "finished form" wood for export

Several international shipping companies have also previously been implicated in the export of illegally harvested wood from Madagascar, although most of them immediately and unequivocally ceased such operations when confronted with the issue. Between January and April 2009, United Africa Feeder Line (UAFL), based in Mauritius, shipped 80% of the exports out of Vohémar and Delmas Shipping, based in France and a subsidiary of CMA CGM, shipped the remaining 20%. According to local sources, Spanfreight and Safmarine Container Lines N.V. have also been involved in the exports, although the EIA and Global Witness report could not substantiate the claim at the time. Other companies, such as Pacific International Lines (PIL), may also be involved or may become involved, but it is difficult to track since containers are transshipped, and effectively laundered, through nearby Réunion or Mauritius. By the end of 2009, only Delmas continued to ship rosewood and other precious woods out of Madagascar, although it was beginning to come under public pressure to stop.

Ultimately demand fuels the market for these precious woods. Most of the blame rests with the Chinese and Westerners, who unknowingly prop up this high-priced market through their demand for high-class furniture and musical instruments made from rosewood or ebony. Therefore, the solution lies in public education to help control demand and teach people how their money can indirectly support these illegal activities by providing revenue to companies that directly support them through investment.

==== China ====
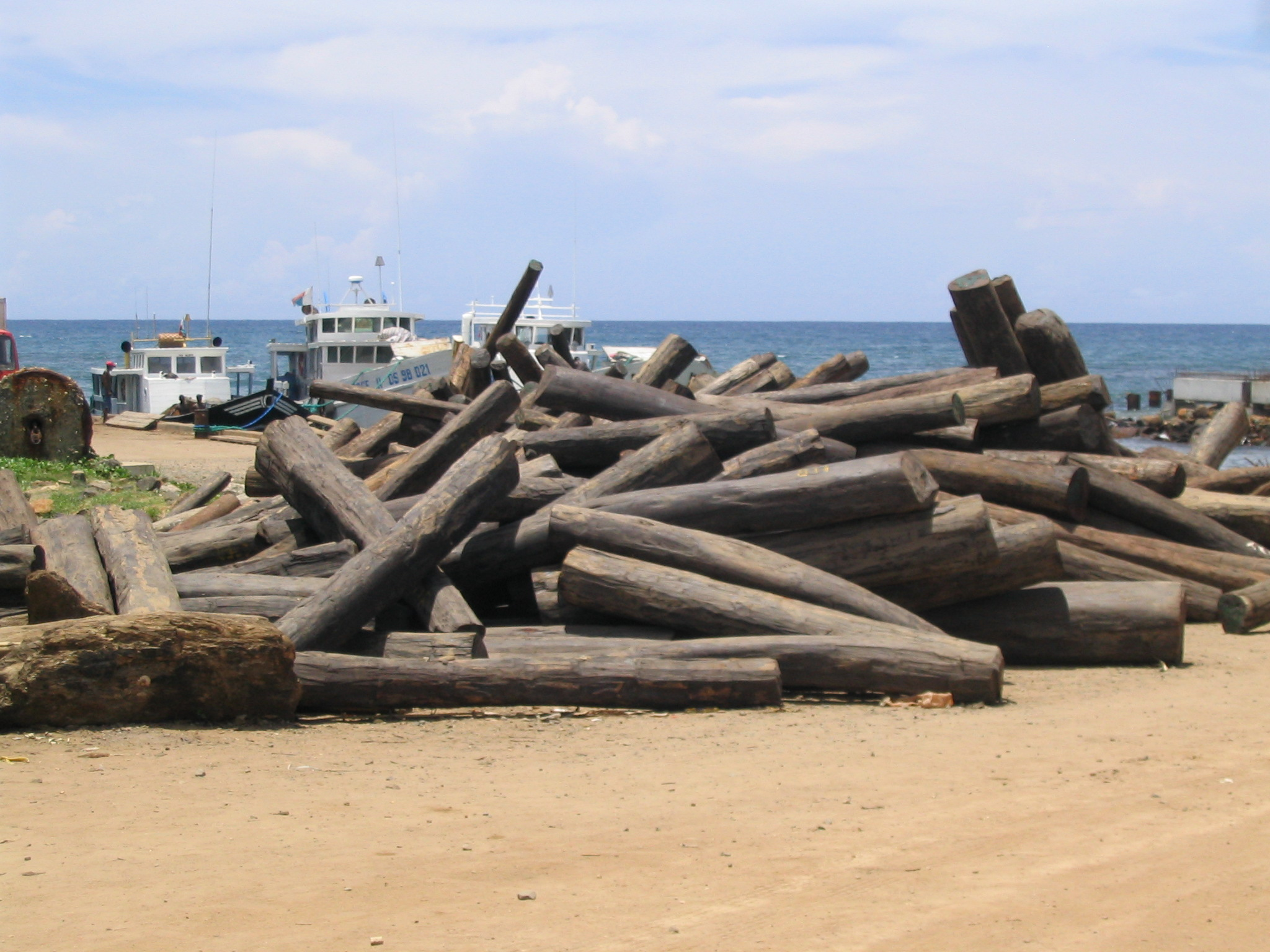
Rosewood stockpile sits on a beach near Antalaha, awaiting export to China or Europe

China is the largest consumer of tropical woods in the world. As of 2008, it imports 45 million cubic meters of tropical wood per year, a fourfold increase since 1998. Having depleted its own rosewood stands and those of nearby neighbors, such as Burma, Chinese timber importers have focused their attentions on Madagascar. As a result, nearly all of the rosewood exported from the SAVA Region is shipped to Chinese import companies. Malagasy precious woods are primarily shipped to four cities in China: Hong Kong, Dalian, Shanghai, Ganzhou.

The international demand for Madagascar's precious woods, such as rosewood and ebony, is growing primarily due to a surge in the numbers of Chinese middle class over the last five years. Furniture, such as armories, beds, and cabinets, styled after ornate designs from the Ming Dynasty fetch up to $10,000, and traditional Chinese instruments are associated with fine red grain of rosewood and have become a popular way for the Chinese middle class to express their new-found wealth.

In 2009, the vast majority of the illegally obtained rosewood was exported to several Chinese ports. On October 31 alone, 55 containers holding 7,267 logs, weighing 989 tons and valued at $11 million, were shipped to China from Vohémar. It has also been demonstrated that illegal logging is funded with advance payments from Chinese buyers; and that the local rosewood mafia collude with the foreign profiteers, primarily from China. The EIA and Global Witness reported further that logging operations also received significant funds from a network of Chinese importers based in Antananarivo. These importers are part of a recently established expatriate community of Chinese people in Madagascar. Many hold passports due to a questionable practice, started by the Prime Minister under former president Marc Ravalomanana, whereby Chinese immigrants could buy passports for 500,000 ariary or $2,500 per person. According to an October issue of the Madagascar Tribune, these importers operate by selling Chinese household and electronic goods in Madagascar, using artificial customs declarations to under-report both their sales and their revenue, and then instead of repatriating the proceeds, they use the money to finance the tropical wood purchases of their compatriots in the SAVA Region.

In addition to the loans from the international banks, this infusion of cash from the new Chinese community is essential to keeping the illegal logging going at times when the wood is blocked from export. According to a local source, boxes of money were unloaded from small planes on November 28, 2009, in Sambava. The money was sent from the bank-like system controlled by the Chinese community in Antananarivo. This infusion of money came in response to two months of blocked rosewood exports at Vohémar, involving 170 containers that required a payment of a $35,500 "fine" per container.

==== Europe and the United States ====
Although Chinese demand constitutes the vast majority of the demand for Malagasy rosewood and other precious tropical woods, they are still popular in Europe and North America—particularly rosewood. Between January and April 2009, approximately 1.5% of the wood harvested in the SAVA Region and exported from Vohémar made its way directly to Europe in semi-finished form for the production of musical instruments and craft furniture. The tree species in these shipments consisted mostly of ebony, palissandre, faho, and andrapotsy. In some cases, the wood is shipped to China, where it is crafted into products that are eventually sold in the United States and Europe as high-end goods. Given the lack of documentation, many importers do not know the species of rosewood used or the country of origin, making it difficult for North American and European companies to filter out illegal products.

Steps are being made to encumber the illegal timber trade by Western countries. In one such instance, federal agents from the United States Fish and Wildlife Service raided Gibson Guitar Corporation's Massman Road manufacturing facility on November 17, 2009, and reportedly confiscated wood, guitars, computers, and boxes of files on the grounds of a possible violation of the Lacey Act, which holds U.S. companies to the environmental laws of foreign countries. Reportedly, the company was involved in plans to ship wood from Madagascar to the United States through Germany. Charges have not been filed, and Gibson Guitar released a statement that it was cooperating fully with the investigation. The day following the raid, CEO Henry Juszkiewicz took a leave of absence from the board of the Rainforest Alliance. Gibson Guitar holds a chain-of-custody certification from the Rainforest Alliance, however wood from Madagascar is not covered under that certificate.

Another company that has been identified as having ties to the illegal timber trade in Madagascar is Flavour Handling LLC. Reports show that Jeannot Ranjanoro, one of Madagascar's most noteworthy timber traffickers, exports rosewood under this Delaware-based corporation. If the allegations are true, they may come under investigation under the Lacey Act and face prosecution.

=== International outcry and effects on shipping ===
Unlike the international banks, shipping companies have been the primary target of the public outcry over the illegal logging and timber trading in Madagascar. Several companies were shown to have been involved in the shipping of rosewood, but most willingly ended their participation when the issue was called to their attention. Delmas, which had been the most prominent transporter of rosewood in 2009, has received the brunt of the attention due to its reluctance to cease its transport of wood. The company originally dismissed criticisms by citing authorizations to export from Madagascar's Minister of Environment and Forests.

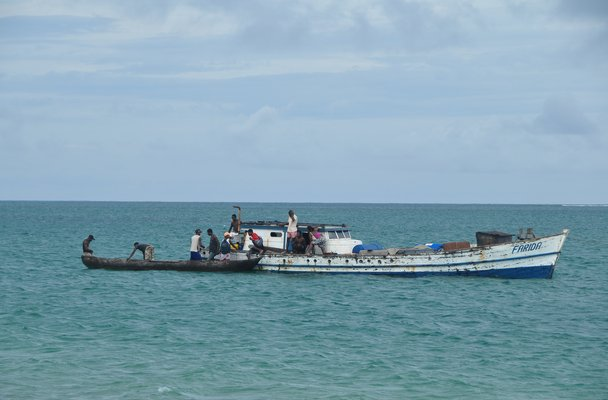
Workers load illegally logged rosewood onto a transport vessel bound for the nearest major port

In December 2009, international outcry was generated and channeled through the internet by activist networks, such as Ecological Internet, over a rosewood shipment scheduled for December 21 or 22 from Vohémar. Both the French government and Delmas were targeted with mass emailing while the French delegation at climate talks in Copenhagen were notified of Delmas' EU FLEGT Action Plan violation, which conflicts with France's position on reducing illegal logging to reduce emissions from deforestation. As a result, the shipment was canceled.

Two weeks after the cancellation, representatives from Andry Rajoelina's government began pressuring Delmas to pick up the shipment, which included more than 200 containers worth $40 million. Threats from Patrick Leloup, an adviser to Rajoelina, were reportedly issued to Delmas, stating that their refusal to transport the wood would result in a ban from doing business in Madagascar. Delmas was targeted because it was the only company that had enough empty containers in Vohémar to transport the shipment. Under pressure, Delmas began to show signs that its position might change.

Despite previous reports of being "enraged" by previous timber exports, Rajoelina may have turned to rosewood exports to fund his financially isolated government. Signing a decree on December 31, 2009, his transitional authority authorized the export of rosewood stocks in Vohémar, with the first pick-up scheduled for January 15, 2010. However, on January 13, Delmas once again refused to ship rosewood in fear of tarnishing its reputation. In March, Delmas succumbed to pressure from the Malagasy government and resumed rosewood shipments with permission of the French government. However, near the end of March the Malagasy government, in turn, gave in to public pressure and reinstated the ban on rosewood logging and exports for two to five years with decree number 2010-141.

== Confiscated logs ==
The confiscation of illegally harvested woods is called for by Malagasy law in accordance with the Forestry Act. However, confiscations have only happened on a small scale, and the wood usually ends up back in the hands of the timber barons. For example, on previous occasions seized wood has been stamped and auctioned off, only to be re-obtained by exporters. Other seized stockpiles have either mysteriously disappeared, or have been stolen back from government headquarters when riots have broken out.

This raises concerns about what effects proper law enforcement would have on the trade, since it may only postpone the problem. Since small-scale auction for international consumption have previously failed, the destruction of seized logs has been discussed in the conservation literature. Although this approach has been taken in Africa to deal with confiscated ivory, the burning of the wood would produce significant pollution and would be dangerous and complicated to control.

Another option involves allowing the local wood crafting community to transform the wood into finished goods, thus bringing money into economically devastated parts of the country. However, the sheer volume of wood currently in stockpiles far exceeds what the local craft community could process, leaving large stocks in storage for decades. Protecting these stored stocks would be problematic at best. Also by promoting the use of these precious woods for crafts, a market is created and people's livelihoods become dependent upon it. Once the confiscated stocks are depleted, once again there will be demand to resume logging.

Another proposed option involves the auctioning of log ownership at their current market value (approximately $1,300) with the money going towards a forest fund. Beneficiaries, selected from those negatively impacted by the logging, would receive operating funds from the sales. Additionally, they would receive engraved logs (bola-bola) for display at protected areas, villages, and education or health centers as reminders of the destruction that peaked during 2009 and 2010.

== Environmental and social impacts ==
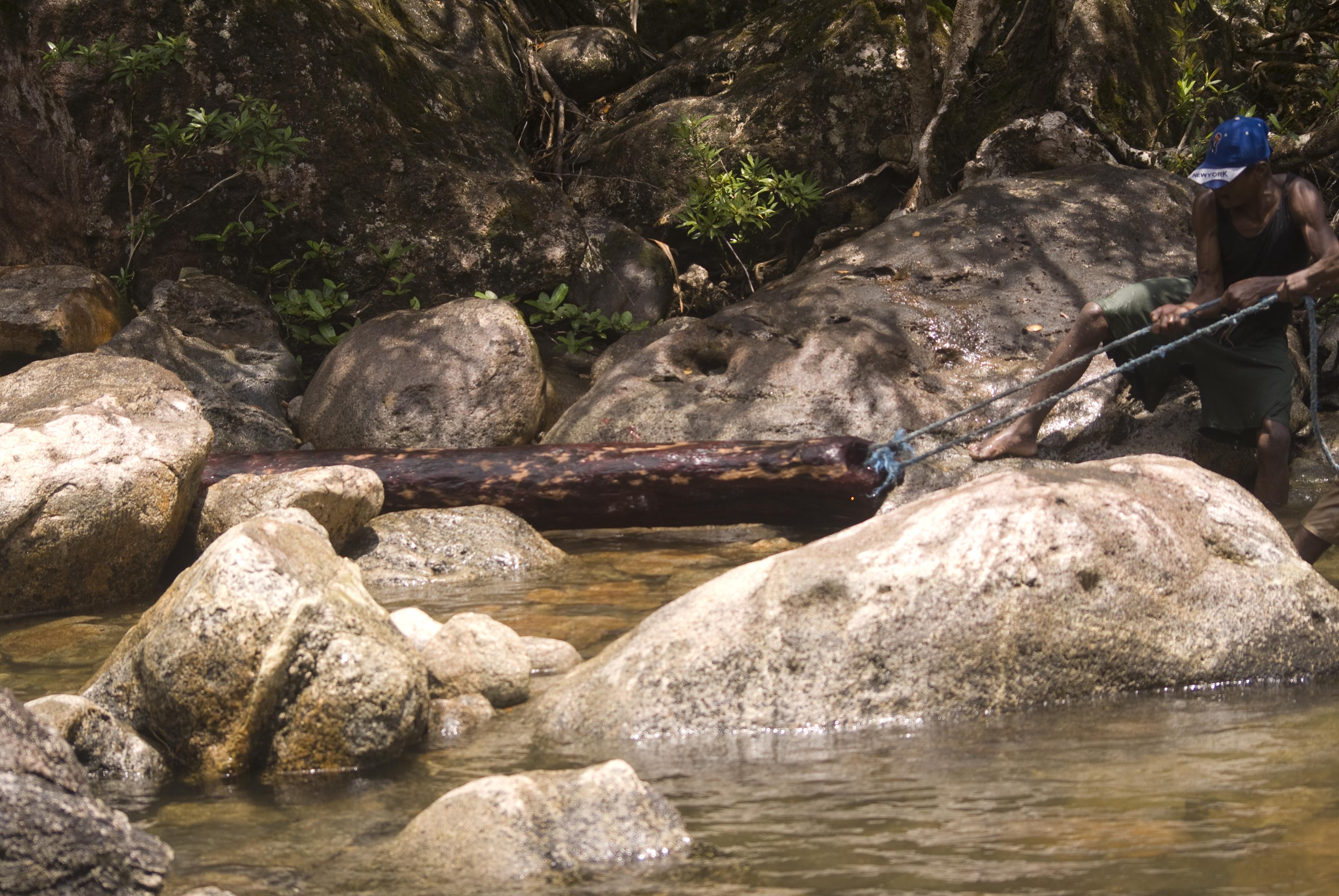
A Malagasy worker extracts a heavy rosewood log from Masoala National Park. The work is very strenuous and pays little, if at all.

Although not as immediately devastating as large-scale clearcutting, the selective logging taking place in Madagascar's protected areas creates secondary effects that can be just as harmful, if not more so, to both the local environment and local communities. These effects include the introduction of invasive species, increased susceptibility to fire due to localized drying, impaired habitat, reduced genetic diversity and biodiversity, and collateral damage from dragging the trees out of the forest. In some cases, the disturbances create enough unbalance to cause the forest to die off completely. Human activities also tend to increase, further destroying what remains. Poaching and wildlife trafficking, as well as illegal mining have been documented in newly disturbed areas. Furthermore, local communities can be negatively impacted. Local villagers have been threatened into silence or exploited for cheap, dangerous labor, and all of these activities within the forest often violate local taboos.

With decades of illegal logging in Madagascar's protected areas it comes as little surprise that evidence of closely associated activities, such as slash-and-burn agriculture, tree cutting, honey extraction, and bushmeat hunting, were discovered in Marojejy National Park by a research team in 2008. With the recent political instability, these transgressions have increased in frequency and severity along with the illegal logging, and now threaten the existence of critically endangered lemurs and other species. This has done irreparable damage and jeopardized over thirty years of conservation work.

The sheer size of the areas already affected during 2009 highlight the threats posed by illegal logging in Madagascar, particularly in the SAVA Region. The total areas impacted include between 4,665 and 9,330 hectares (18.0 and 36.0 sq mi) in Marojejy and northern Masoala, 1,500 hectares (5.8 sq mi) in Makira and 5,000 hectares (20 sq mi) in southern Masoala. To make matters worse, extensive forest clearing has been occurring around the parks' rivers. Since it takes four to five lighter trees (such as Dombeya species) to create a raft to float the much denser, heavier rosewood logs, loggers cut these lighter trees along the riverside first, causing erosion and silting of the streams and rivers. According to the EIA and Global Witness report, observations suggested at that 200 to 400 lighter trees were being cut per day to transport the rosewood.

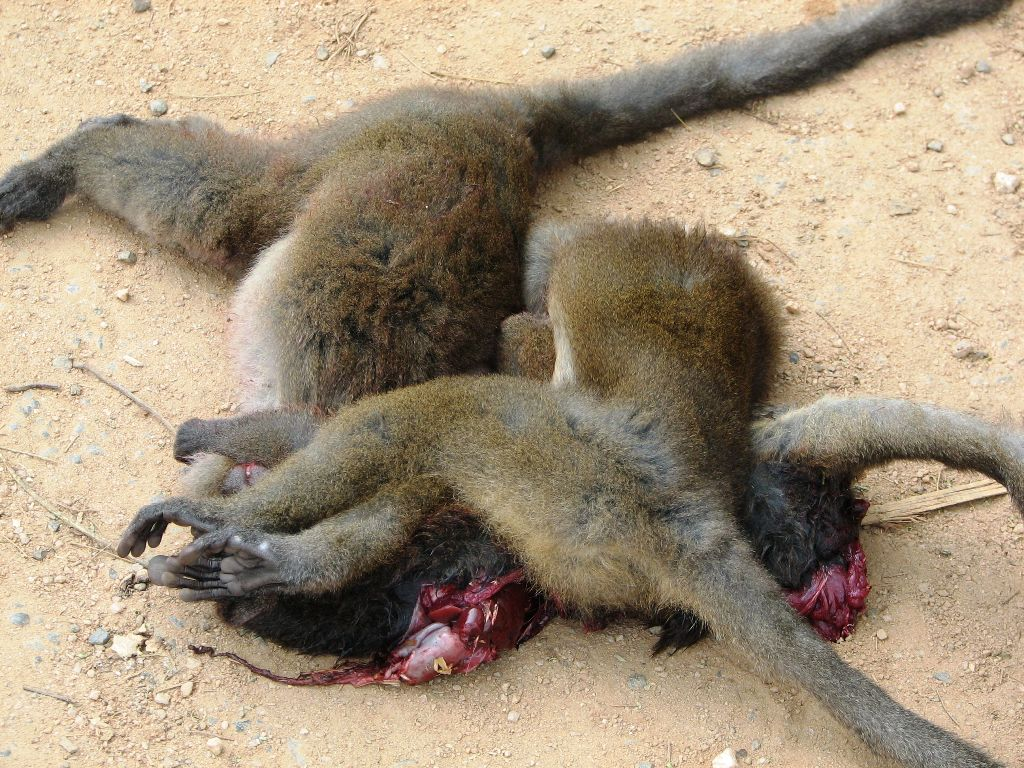
Three dead bamboo lemurs (Hapalemur griseus), killed for bushmeat in northeast Madagascar. The meat is often consumed by loggers or sold to up-scale restaurants as a delicacy.

Lemurs and other endemic wildlife have become the target for poachers, a problem that has increased significantly since the large-scale illegal logging has commenced. Malagasy reptiles have long been a target of animal traders, but as smuggling of these species has intensified, now lemurs are also being collected and illegally exported for the exotic pet trade.

Initially following the political upheaval, conservation organizations were concerned that lemurs and other wildlife would be hunted for food by the thousands of loggers living and working in the protected areas. This indeed has happened, although the scale of the damage is unknown. However, unlike the bushmeat problems in other tropical countries, the majority of the meat from illegal hunting has not gone to feeding the hungry, impoverished rural populations. Instead, a "luxury market" has developed in the larger towns, including the capital, Antananarivo. Around Makira, lemurs have been tracked using trained dogs, killed, smoked on-site, and sold to up-scale restaurants around the region. In August 2009, photos of piles of dead lemurs that had been confiscated from traders and restaurants in northern Madagascar were published by Conservation International.

The numbers of killed and exported lemurs are unknown, but they include the indri and the critically endangered silky sifaka and golden-crowned sifaka. Marojejy alone contains eleven species of lemur, including the silky sifaka.

Illegal logging has affected more than just the forests and the wildlife. Communities living around the national parks rely heavily on tourism for economic support since they receive half of the park entrance fees. Some community members also work as guides, porters, shopkeepers, hotel and restaurant personnel, so when tourism declines or ceases, their lives and the local economy they help fuel fall into jeopardy. Other communities receive fewer benefits from tourists, particularly around Masoala and Marojejy National Parks, which are difficult to reach and have minimal infrastructure. However, logging is still physically demanding and dangerous work that offers minimal pay, leaving them few options. Still, much of the logging and lemur hunting at Masoala is done by members of nearby communities. Emigrants coming into the region likewise have limited or no opportunities for earning income, making these illegal activities their only option.

The influx of immigrant loggers introduces new risks for the local communities, such as rural food shortages, and increase in crime rate, and an increase in the rate of sexually transmitted diseases, such as HIV. Although the increased economic activity introduced by logging might be seen as a benefit, the windfall is mostly seen by the traders and not the rural Malagasy poor, who do the strenuous physical labor for minimal pay. Some locals have abstained from logging from fear of prosecution, while others have turned to logging out of desperation. With armed militia occupying villages and issuing death threats towards people who object to their activities, people live in fear and communities and families have been divided.

== See also ==
- Deforestation in Madagascar
- 2009 Malagasy political crisis
- Economy of Madagascar
- Rainforests of the Atsinanana
