= United Africa Feeder Line =

United Africa Feeder Line (UAFL) is a shipping company founded in 2000 as a regional feeder service in Africa. Head office of UAFL is Dubai (UAE). UAFL is serving East-Africa, Southern Africa and the Indian Ocean Islands out of Europe, Asia and the Middle East/Indian Subcontinent with owned and chartered vessels. UAFL is part of Indian Ocean Shipping Holdings Ltd a shipping and logistics group based in Mauritius.

Director of UAFL is Dr. Dag-Sven Dieckmann and General Manager is Mr Mohamed Atallah
