= One-male group =

Type of social organization

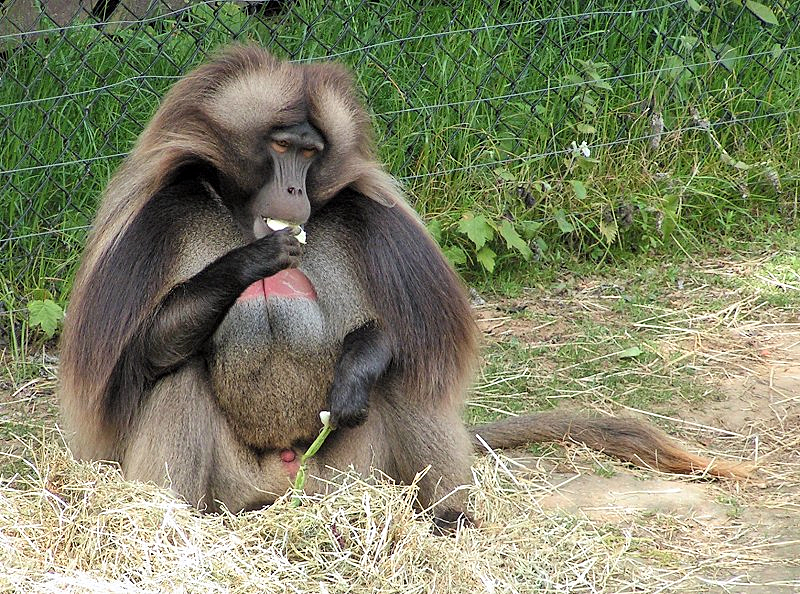
Gelada Baboon Male

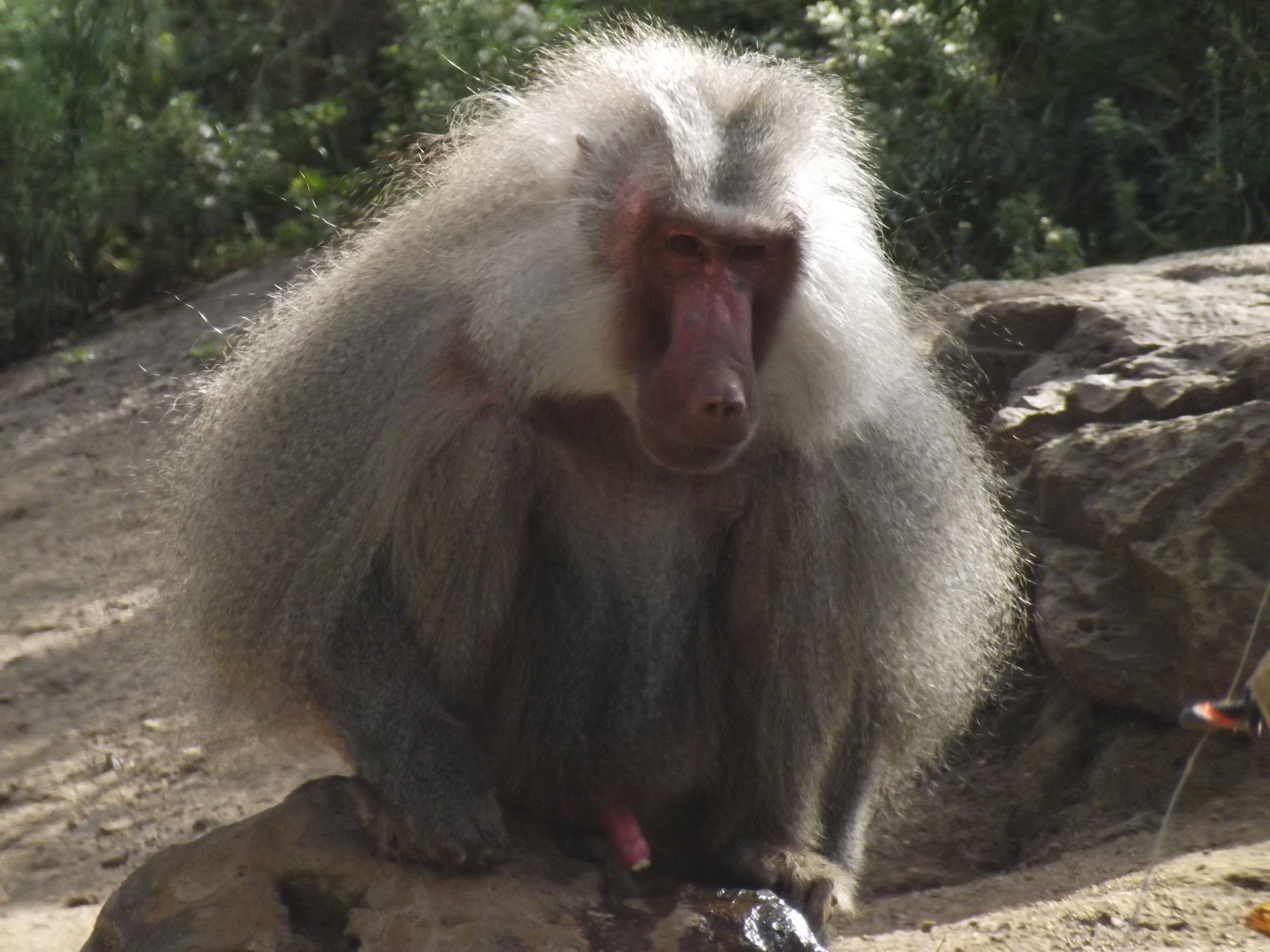
Hamadryas Baboon Male

One-male groups are a type of social organization where one male interacts with a group of females and their immature offspring. Offspring of both sexes are evicted from the group upon reaching puberty. It can be seen in many species of primates, including the gelada baboon, the patas monkey, savanna baboon, sun-tailed monkey, golden snub-nosed monkey, and the hamadryas baboon. There are costs and benefits for individuals living in one-male groups. As well, individuals within one-male groups can interact with each other just like individuals can interact with those from different one-male groups.

== Origin ==
A study of savanna baboons (hamadryas ursinus) indicates that the one-male groups in this species are formed by fissioning. For example, a 100-month old male entered a multi male - multi female (mm) group then formed a one-male group with eight of the adult females in the MM group. Juveniles of the species, suspected to be young of the eight adult females, also joined the new one-male group. However, when a new male successfully enters a one-male group, the social hierarchy will be changed depending on the previously determined rankings of the newly entered male. The previous resident male of the one-male group may be out-ranked and therefore placed lower on the hierarchy of males.

== Costs ==
=== Infanticide ===
One of the costs of living in one-male groups is the killing of unweaned young by conspecific adult males. This is known as infanticide, and mostly occurs when adult males or coalitions of males takeover the group and kill the resident male. This is done to increase the reproductive success of the intervening males because the females are more likely to mate with them now that they need to produce new offspring. While the infanticide is an obvious cost to females, it is beneficial to the infanticidal males. Infanticide in one-male groups has been studied in the Virungas population of mountain gorillas.

=== Inbreeding ===
Another cost of living in one-male social groups is that there is a high occurrence of inbreeding. This means that closely related individuals can mate and produce offspring. This results in decreasing genetic diversity with subsequent generations of the species. For example, inbreeding has been studied in one-male groups of sun-tailed monkeys (Cercopithecus solatus). In this study, the time between two births for females increased when an inbred offspring was born. This suggests that there could be increased maternal costs with giving birth to and rearing an inbred offspring, compared to a noninbred offspring. Inbreeding depression resulted from the decreased genetic diversity within this population, meaning that the population as a whole experienced a decrease in fitness (i.e. reproductive success). Unlike infanticide, the high occurrence of inbreeding in one-male groups is a disadvantageous to both the females and males in the group.

== Benefits ==
=== Feeding advantages ===
Experiments involving the hamadryas baboon species (hamadryas hamadryas) provide evidence of feeding advantages for male and female members of one-male groups. However, the findings of feeding advantages were only evident when these one-male groups formed clans. It has been shown that males from single one-male groups did not approach males that were part of clans to compete for food sources. Additionally, it was found that males from smaller clans did not approach males from bigger clans (i.e. with more one-male groups) to compete for food. Ultimately, these feeding advantages of decreased competition were seen between one-male groups, not for males within the same groups or clans. In addition, it can be said that males and females in a clan have feeding advantages compared to males and females in single one-male groups because it has been shown that the males and females in clans gain access to clumped food sources earlier than those in single one-male groups and that they spend more time with clumped food sources than the single groups.

== Within-group interactions ==
=== Female-female interactions ===
Studies of social interactions among golden snub‐nosed monkeys (Rhinopithecus roxellana) reveal that adult females tend to interact with each other, but they do not form strong social bonds with other females in the same one-male group.

=== Female-male interactions ===
It has been shown that adult female golden snub-nosed monkeys do not form strong social relationships with the resident male in the one-male group. However, the adult females tended to interact more with other adult females instead of the resident male when they were looking for social interaction.

=== Patterns of social relationships ===
While researchers have found that individuals in one-male groups of hamadryas baboons exhibit a pattern of social relationships called a star-shaped relationship, it has been found that gelada baboon (Theropithecus gelada) individuals in one-male groups exhibit a net-shaped relationship pattern. Individuals in the snub-nosed monkey species exhibit a different pattern of social relationships than the two other baboon species.

== Between-group interactions ==
=== Allomaternal nursing ===
In a study of social relationships among a clan (i.e. multiple one-male groups) of Yunnan snub-nosed monkeys (Rhinopithecus bieti), it was determined that the adult females of one-male groups sometimes care for the young of other one-male groups. For example, when a mother and her young offspring were accidentally separated, a mother belonging to a different one-male group cared for the young. The separated young was nursed by the adoptive mother (who also nursed her own offspring) and tolerated by the resident male of the one-male group that the offspring was now temporarily a part of.

=== Affiliative interactions ===
Affiliative interactions between individuals of one-male groups include sitting near, grooming in front of, and handling the infants of other one-male groups. The most prevalent type of affiliative interaction seen in a study involving Sichuan snub-nosed monkeys (Rhinopithecus roxellana) is infant handling. This infant handling can form gatherings of multiple one-male units that forage together. This type of social structure is called a band.

== See also ==
- Multi-male group
