= Multi-male group =

Type of social organization

Basic requirements of individual primates include obtaining food, avoiding predators, and reproducing. When these basic requirements are best pursued in the company of others, groups will form. Multi-male groups, also known as multi-male/multi-female, are a type of social organization where the group contains more than one adult male, more than one adult female, and offspring. This structure is characterized by group living (as opposed to solitary), polygynandrous, and strong reproductive competition among males, which could result in an uneven division of male reproductive success (i.e. reproductive skew). There are no stable heterosexual bonds as both males and females have a number of different mates. Multi-male groups are common among semi-terrestrial primates, like savanna baboons, macaques, colobus and some New World monkeys.

== Avoiding predators ==
A factor influencing the number of males in a group may be to avoid predators, as a study found significant positive correlations between the number of males in a group and the predation risk where the group lived. Another study found that there is a significant positive correlation between the number of males per female and the estimated predation rate. This finding may reflect the adaptive advantage to females of tolerating multiple males that provide vigilance and predator defense.

There are two theories about the advantages of multi-male groups against predators: (1) males are more vigilant or (2) males more actively engage in the physical defense of the group's females and immatures.

== Female reproductive behavior ==
In multi-male groups, there is typically no single male that has full control over the reproductive share of females. Females in multi-male groups will mate multiple times with different top ranking males as well as lower ranking males and occasionally bachelor "lone wolf" males outside of the group. Most female primates do not have a particular breeding season but can be receptive all year around, however they will most likely not mate if they are already caring for an infant.

Female-female conflicts over reproduction have been overlooked in contrast to male-male competition. Recently, reviews and studies found that while it may not affect mating competition, sexual activity is a primary determinant of female-female aggression and thus female social relationships.

== Parental care ==
In social systems with promiscuous breeding like multi-male groups, polygamy causes possible ambiguity in parentage. Since kin discrimination between fathers and infants could be more difficult, it has been theorized in the past that the incidence of male care of infants in polygamous primate groups may be less in multi-male groups than in monogamous primate groups. However, in the last five years, this view has changed as a result of careful documentation of intimate male-infant affiliations in certain species, especially in the savanna-dwelling baboons species and barbary macaques. Male paternal care includes: protection from predators, protection from aggression by conspecifics, access to preferred foods, grooming, transport, and adoption. Among other macaques, chimpanzees, and vervet monkeys, male care of young is reports the least. The variation in male paternal care may be due to the differences in the importance of male care to infant survival, the differences in male confidence of paternity, which may relate to seasonal breeding patterns and the presence or absence of conspicuous signs of female ovulation, and the relative costs and benefits of other opportunities available to males (e.g. mating opportunities).

== Infanticide ==
Significant male infanticide has been documented in a number of multi-male societies in two general contexts: when new immigrants rise to the alpha position in the male dominance hierarchy; or when coalitionary cohorts of alien males collectively replace the entire male membership of a group.

In some multi-male groups, the costs for infanticidal males seem likely to be high, since other resident males might defend the victim, and the benefits seem likely to be low because of the generally lower paternal probability in multi-male groups. However, in other primate species living in multi-male groups, males have been observed to kill infants. The aggressors are typically extra-group males, recent immigrants, have recently been introduced or are conceived outside the group, mainly due to the fact that they could not possibly be related to the infants they kill. A male's age and rank influence the occurrence of infanticide. The youngest and highest-ranking immigrant males are more likely to commit infanticide than their older and lower-ranking counterparts if putative fathers fail to protect infants.

== Costs/benefits (trade-offs) ==
A benefit of living in multi-male groups is the collective protection that the group as a whole receives from outsiders as well as sufficient protection of infants against infanticide from other outside roaming males. Another benefit is the low costs of finding a mate and reproducing since the males and females are always together. Also, participants in multi-male groups have better access to resources such as food and living quarters. However, a major cost to living in a multi-male group is the constant competition for mates, mainly among males but also among females.

== Interactions between overlapping multi-male groups ==
Most non-human primate communities are more or less closed to contact with members of other communities. Most often, they are tied to a particular locale and rarely migrate outside of their home range. This aloofness from other troops prevents high concentrations of individuals, which could result in rapid depletion of local resources. Communities usually avoid each other and are aggressive towards outsiders. As a result, social interactions between members of different troops are usually very rare, especially for females. Chimpanzees are a notable exception. When chimpanzees from different troops come together, there is often an exciting, friendly encounter lasting several hours, following which, some of the adult females switch groups. Apparently, they are seeking new mates. Occasionally, however, contact between communities of the comparatively unpredictable chimpanzees will develop into genocidal violence. Interactions within non-human primate communities are usually unlimited. Subgroups are rarely closed from group interaction. All members of a community have daily face-to-face, casual interaction. The most common type of subgroup consists of a mother and her young offspring.

== See also ==
- One-male group
