= List of bridges in Madagascar =

This is a list of bridges and viaducts in Madagascar, including those for pedestrians and vehicular traffic.

== Historical and architectural interest bridges ==
	Name	Distinction	Length	Type	Carries Crosses	Opened	Location	Region	Ref.
1	Anosizato Suspension Bridge dismantled	Conception by Ferdinand Arnodin	90 m (300 ft)	Suspension	Route nationale 1 Ikopa River	1909	Antananarivo	Analamanga	
2	Tsingy Suspension Bridge	Tsingy de Bemaraha Strict Nature Reserve; World Heritage Site		Suspension	Footbridge		Antsalova; 19°01′03.4″S 44°46′28.2″E	Melaky	

== Major road and railway bridges ==
Kamoro, Mananjary and Betsiboka Bridges are three suspension bridges erected in Madagascar by the French company G. Leinekugel Le Cocq & Fils between 1931 and 1934.

This table presents the structures with spans greater than 100 meters (non-exhaustive list).

	Name	Span	Length	Type	Carries Crosses	Opened	Location	Region	Ref.
1	Kamoro Bridge	206 m (676 ft)	262 m (860 ft)	Suspension; Steel girder deck, steel pylons 206+56	Route nationale 4 Mahajamba River	1934	Antanambazaha; 16°27′38.9″S 47°10′07.5″E	Boeny	
2	New Kamoro Bridge	206 m (676 ft)	265 m (869 ft)	Suspension; Steel girder deck, concrete pylons 206+21+21+18	Route nationale 4 Mahajamba River	2017	Antanambazaha; 16°27′38.5″S 47°10′07.4″E	Boeny	
3	Mananjary Bridge	159 m (522 ft)	196 m (643 ft)	Suspension; Steel girder deck, steel pylons 17+159+17	Route nationale 25; Mananjary River	1934	Mananjary; 21°13′06.0″S 48°13′58.9″E	Vatovavy	
4	Bemarivo Bridge	140 m (460 ft)		Arch; Steel tied arch Bow-string bridge	Route nationale 5a Bemarivo River	1964	Nosiarina; 14°12′11.0″S 50°03′06.2″E	Sava Region	
5	Lokoho Bridge	140 m (460 ft)	174 m (571 ft)	Arch; Steel tied arch Bow-string bridge	Route nationale 5a Lokoho River	1964	Farahalana; 14°26′00.2″S 50°09′25.2″E	Sava Region	
6	Betsiboka Bridge destroyed in 1942	130 m (430 ft)		Suspension; Steel girder deck, steel pylons	Route nationale 4 Betsiboka River	1934	Maevatanana; 16°56′16.4″S 46°56′58.9″E	Betsiboka	
7	Fanambana Bridge	120 m (390 ft)	195 m (640 ft)	Cable-stayed; Steel, 1 pylon 120+75	Route nationale 5a Fanambana River	1964	Fanambana; 13°32′43.8″S 49°59′14.5″E	Sava Region	

== Notes and references ==
- Nicolas Janberg. "International Database for Civil and Structural Engineering". Structurae.com.
- Others references

== See also ==
- Transport in Madagascar
- List of roads in Madagascar
- Rail transport in Madagascar
- Geography of Madagascar
- List of rivers of Madagascar
