= List of rivers of Madagascar =

This is a list of streams and rivers in Madagascar

== A ==
Andranotsimisiamalona River - Ankavanana - Antainambalana River

== B ==
Bemarivo River - Besokatra River - Betsiboka River - Bombetoka River

== F ==
Fanambana River - Faraony River - Fiherenana River

== I ==
Iazafo - Ifasy River - Ihosy River - Ikopa River - Irodo River - Ivondro River

== L ==
Linta River - Lokoho River - Loky River

== M ==
Mahajamba River - Mahajilo River - Mahavavy River - Manambaho River - Manambolo River - Manampatrana River - Mananara River (south) - Mananara River (Analanjirofo) - Mananjary River - Mananjeba River - Mandrare River - Mangoky River - Mangoro River - Mania River - Maningory River - Marimbona - Menarandra River - Morondava River

== N ==
Namorona River - Nosivolo River

== O ==
Onilahy River - Onive River - Onive River (Sava)

== R ==
Ramena River - Rianila River

== S ==
Sahamaitso - Saharenana River - Sahatandra - Sahatavy River - Sakaleona River - Sakanila River - Sakay river - Sahamaitso - Sakeny River - Sambirano River - Sandrananta River - Sandrangato - Simianona River - Sofia River

== T ==
Tahititnaloke River - Tsaratamana - Tsiribihina River

== Z ==
Zomandao River

== See also ==
- List of bridges in Madagascar
