= Massacre of Fort-Dauphin (Madagascar) =

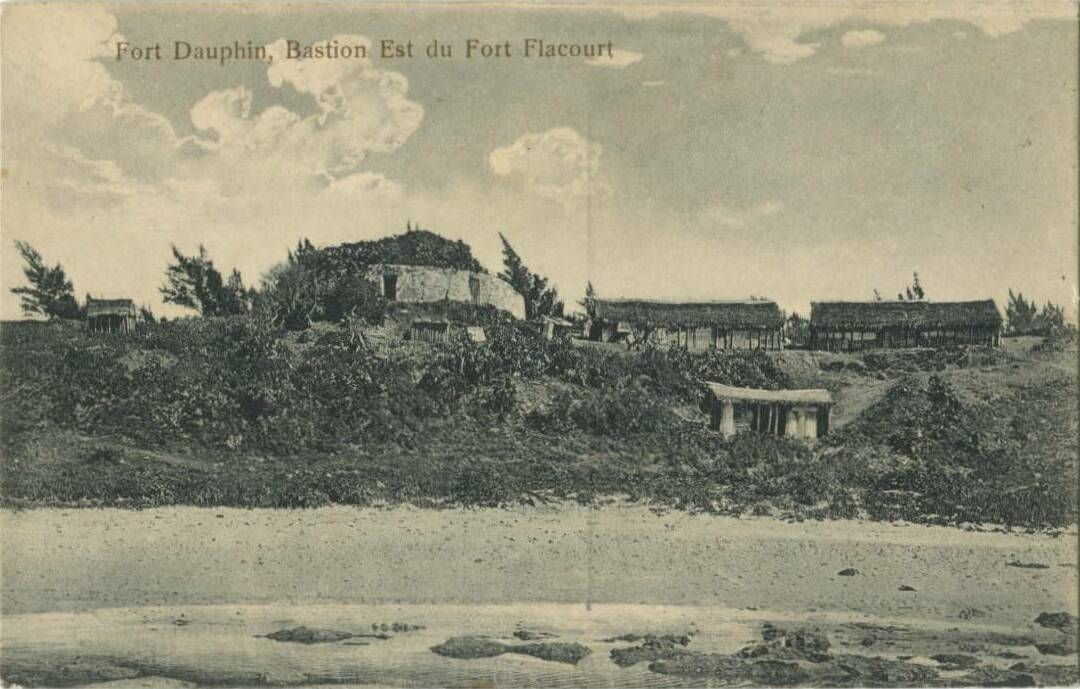
Ruins of the colony, image c. 1900

The Massacre of Fort Dauphin was a massacre that took place in the evening of 27 August 1674 in the coastal French colony of Fort-Dauphin, in the Anosy region of modern-day Tolagnaro, Madagascar. Perpetrated by the nearby indigenous Antanosy population, it was directed against French colonists who had been settled in Fort-Dauphin beginning in 1642 as part of an initiative to settle the island of Madagascar by the Kingdom of France. The massacre marked the end of the first wave of French colonisation of Madagascar.

== Fort-Dauphin and the prelude to the massacre ==
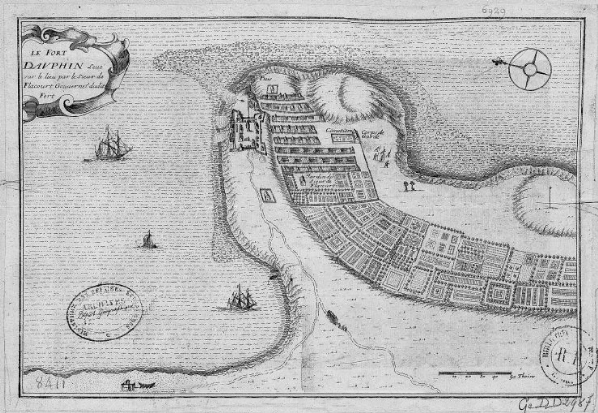
Fort-Dauphin in 1650.

Between 1642 and 1674, approximately 4,000 French civilians and soldiers were sent to the fortified town of Fort-Dauphin. Although they had reserved area to be made into farmland, the colonists had little experience with cultivating crops in this kind of environment, and instead turned to trading for survival. However, not many ships would stop in Fort-Dauphin due to a lack of economic opportunities and from 1648 to 1654 not a single ship arrived in the colony.

The fortress itself was made of hay and the houses were merely huts made of wood, reeds and vegetation, making the community very vulnerable to attack. After the chieftains of Anosy purchased firearms from the Europeans they became as powerful as their French neighbours, ruining any military advantages the town could provide.

Throughout its existence the colony depended on the protection and assistance of the local Antanosy tribes, with whom they held good relations. The French allied with these tribes against their powerful enemy, the chieftain Dian Manangue, who resided to the west of the settlement, around the Mandrare River. The economy of the colony quickly turned from one based on commercial purposes to a system that depended solely on repeated raids against their opponents.

Many missionaries joined the expedition with the intentions of converting the population of Anosy to Roman Catholicism, which caused several conflicts between the colonists and natives. In 1663 the prominent French Lazarist Père Étienne was killed along with his accompanying colleagues after Étienne tried to forcibly take some charms off of Manangue's neck. The French responded with a six-day campaign against the Mandrare River kingdom. A person who had participated in the operation said that the French forces had burned 150 villages in Manangue's land, killing 1,000 soldiers and civilians and taking 4,000 cattle during the six-day campaign.

The colonists were in such a miserable and unfortunate state, sent into deep poverty and with very large amounts dying from starvation, war, and disease, that some observers commented there was no difference in the way of life between the French and the Antanosy. Indeed, the colonists, who were almost entirely male, regularly had sex with Antanosy women and fathered several mixed-race children. Initially the colonial administration approved of these sexual relationships hoping that they would result in the gradual assimilation of the locals into European colonists. The relationships actually had the opposite effect- colonists started speaking the local dialect and even moved into Antanosy villages. Despite efforts by missionaries and officials to stop these events from happening, Antanosy wives and concubines soon began to hold vast influence over Fort-Dauphin's society, having sexual relationships with several men including the governor himself (sparking a mutiny in which the governor was held hostage inside his bedroom for six months).

== The massacre ==
After more than thirty years of existence, the French colony of Fort-Dauphin finally proved to be a burden on the local Antanosy tribes. In addition to the drain on resources the colony represented, their warfare-driven way of life only served to damage and further divide the relations between the tribes. One of the last straws was when a ship sent by the French government called The Dunkerquoise carrying at least twelve unmarried French women arrived at the colony, and were then wed to male colonists. The Antanosy wives and concubines, whose relationships with the colonists had turned into "marriage alliances" that kept Fort-Dauphin safe, grew angry with the fear that they were going to be replaced and ended their marriages, leaving the fort exposed to attack. The chieftains, seeing that Manangue's kingdom was growing stronger and their French allies weaker, decided to join forces with Manangue, knowing that if they did not do so they would themselves be massacred alongside their powerless allies in Fort-Dauphin.

On 16 August 1674, the Antanosy fighters attacked the poorly-defended fort. They murdered at least 74 French colonists (by some accounts over a hundred), and wounded hundreds of others, many seriously. After the massacre ended, half of the colony were lying dead from the slaughter. The survivors who managed to hide from the attackers abandoned the town and escaped on the ship Blanc Pignon (English: White Pigeon) to the island of Bourbon, now Réunion.

After the massacre the French ambitions to settle Madagascar were destroyed and the French presence on the island was ended. The experiment in Fort-Dauphin, now considered the model of how to not establish a colony, was considered disastrous and shattered any hopes of a French recolonization of the island. It would be almost a hundred years before the French returned to Madagascar, establishing the colony of Ile Saint-Marie (now Nosy Boroha), although this colony was also massacred twice, once in 1751 and the other time in 1752. After decades of armed conflicts with the locals and negotiations with the British Empire, the colony of French Madagascar was finally established in 1897.

== See also ==
- Assada Massacre
