= Rianbavy Falls =

- Location within Madagascar
- Location: Ihorombe, Madagascar
- Coordinates: 22°08′50″S 46°53′29″E
- Total height: 250
- Watercourse: Zomandao River

The Rianbavy Falls is a waterfall in the region of Ihorombe in Madagascar.

They are situated on the Zomandao River in the Andringitra Massif near the Andringitra National Park.

At a distance of less than one km from these falls, there are also the Riandahy Falls

== See also ==
- List of waterfalls
