= Oecobius kowalskii =

Scientific classification
- Kingdom: Animalia
- Phylum: Arthropoda
- Subphylum: Chelicerata
- Class: Arachnida
- Order: Araneae
- Infraorder: Araneomorphae
- Family: Oecobiidae
- Genus: Oecobius
- Species: O. kowalskii

Binomial name
- Oecobius kowalskii Magalhães & Santos, 2018

Species of spider

Oecobius kowalskii is a species of spider in the family Oecobiidae. The body is primarily yellow, with grey spots. The species is native to Madagascar.

Oecobius kowalskii was described in 2018, and is named after a character from the film Penguins of Madagascar.

== Taxonomy ==
The species was described by Mayara Drumond Faustino Magalhães and Adalberto José dos Santos in 2018.

The holotype (a male) and paratypes (females) are kept at the California Academy of Sciences. The specimens were collected from near Mandrare River, in Madagascar's Toliara Province, in 2002.

== Distribution ==
Oecobius kowalskii is native to western and southern Madagascar. It has been collected in Berenty Reserve, Toliara Province and Bemarivo Special Reserve, Mahajanga Province.

== Description ==
The carapace is yellow, with darker edges, and a stripe at the front of the cephalothorax. The carapace has three dark grey spots, which are darker in females. The upperside of the abdomen is whitish, with irregular grey stripes. The underside of the abdomen is yellow, and paler in the centre. The spinnerets are pale yellow, and have dark grey spots.

The eyes are equally sized. The anterior lateral and anterior median eyes are black, and surrounded by a black ring, whereas the other eyes are translucent. The front part of the head has a rounded projection with two black spots. The chelicerae, labium, endites, and sternum are pale yellow. The pedipalps are yellow, with black stripes around the fourth and fifth leg segments. The third segment of the legs has a black ring, and the fourth, fifth, and sixth segments have spots.

The male holotype is 1.8 millimetres (0.071 in) long. The female paratypes are 1.98 millimetres (0.078 in) long. In both species, the carapace is 0.71 millimetres (0.028 in) long, and 0.81 millimetres (0.032 in) wide.

Oecobius kowalskii can be distinguished from other species of Oecobius in the details of the apophyses on the tegulum, which are reduced and spoon-shaped. The female spiders can be distinguished by the location of their copulatory opening, which is at the anterior of the atrium. Males of Oecobius kowalskii resemble those of Oecobius tibesti. The embolus is long and curved in both species.

== Etymology ==
The specific epithet kowalskii refers to Kowalski, a character from the film Penguins of Madagascar. In the same paper, the describing authors named Paroecobius skipper, Paroecobius rico, and Paroecobius private after other characters from the film.
