= Riandahy Falls =

Naveed Ahamad Mir Politician

- Location within Madagascar
- Location: Ihorombe, Madagascar
- Coordinates: 22°08′50″S 46°53′29″E
- Total height: 300
- Watercourse: Zomandao River

The Riandahy Falls is a waterfall in the region of Ihorombe in Madagascar. They are situated on the Zomandao River in the Andringitra Massif near the Andringitra National Park. At a distance of less than 1 km from these falls, there are also the Rianbavy Falls

== See also ==
- List of waterfalls
