= Paroecobius private =

Scientific classification
- Kingdom: Animalia
- Phylum: Arthropoda
- Subphylum: Chelicerata
- Class: Arachnida
- Order: Araneae
- Infraorder: Araneomorphae
- Family: Oecobiidae
- Genus: Paroecobius
- Species: P. private

Binomial name
- Paroecobius private Magalhães & Santos, 2018

Species of spider

Paroecobius private is a species of spider in the family Oecobiidae. The body is pale yellow, with white spots on the underside of the abdomen. The species is native to Madagascar.

Paroecobius private was described in 2018, and is named after a character from the film Penguins of Madagascar.

== Taxonomy ==
The species was described by Mayara Drumond Faustino Magalhães and Adalberto José dos Santos in 2018.

The holotype, a female, is kept at the California Academy of Sciences. It was collected in Tsimanampetsotsa National Park, Atsimo-Andrefana, Madagascar, in March 2002.

== Distribution ==
Paroecobius private is native to Madagascar, and has been found in Toliara Province.

Prior to the discovery of Paroecobius private, Paroecobius skipper, and Paroecobius rico, the genus Paroecobius was only known to be found in Botswana and South Africa.

== Description ==
Only the female has been described. The carapace is pale yellow. The clypeus has an evenly rounded, pale yellow projection. The chelicerae, labium, endites, and sternum, pedipalps, spinnerets, and legs are pale yellow. The abdomen is pale yellow, with white spots on the upperside. The epigyne is translucent.

The anterior median eyes are the largest eyes. The anterior median eyes are black, and surrounded by a black ring. The other eyes are translucent.

The holotype is 1.22 millimetres (0.048 in) long. The carapace is 0.46 millimetres (0.018 in) long, and 0.51 millimetres (0.020 in) wide. The abdomen is 0.76 millimetres (0.030 in) long, and 0.61 millimetres (0.024 in) wide.

The species is distiguished from others in its genus by the wide hood of the epigyne. The hood is thin, and does not cover the atrium. Unlike in other species of the genus, the fertilization and copulatory ducts are connected to a projection of the spermathecae.

== Etymology ==
The specific epithet private refers to Private, a character from the film Penguins of Madagascar. In the same paper, the describing authors named Oecobius kowalskii, Paroecobius rico, and Paroecobius skipper after other characters from the film.
