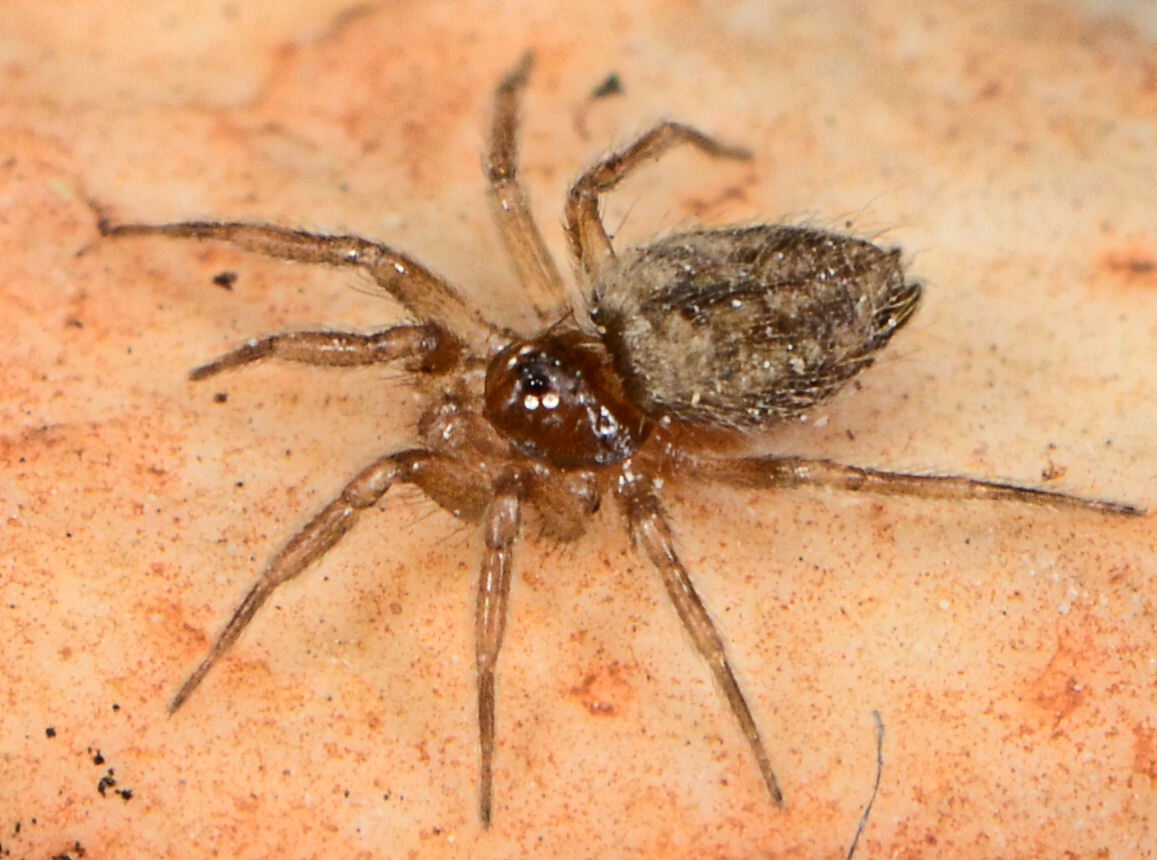
- Female
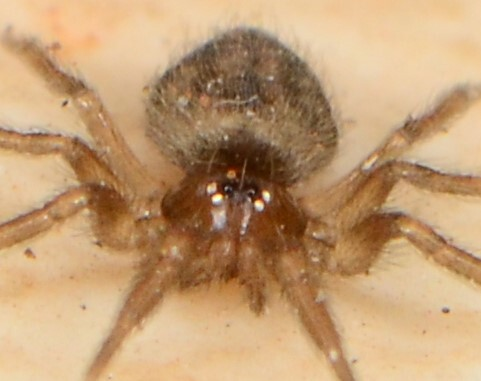
- Female

Scientific classification
- Kingdom: Animalia
- Phylum: Arthropoda
- Subphylum: Chelicerata
- Class: Arachnida
- Order: Araneae
- Infraorder: Araneomorphae
- Family: Oecobiidae
- Genus: Paroecobius
- Species: P. nicolaii

Binomial name
- Paroecobius nicolaii Wunderlich, 1995

= Paroecobius nicolaii =

Nicolai's Large-Eyed Ant Eater

Species of spider

Paroecobius nicolaii is a species of spider in the family Oecobiidae. It is commonly known as Nicolai's large-eyed ant eater and is endemic to South Africa.

== Distribution ==
Paroecobius nicolaii is a South African endemic known from three provinces: Free State, Limpopo, and North West.

== Habitat and ecology ==
The species lives inside shallow crevices of rocks and bark of Marula and Paperbark trees, covered with a silk hammock, which is usually open at two ends. The species has been sampled from the Savanna biome at altitudes ranging from 1,155 to 1,556 m above sea level. At Wyndford Guest Farm, specimens run very fast from one web to another when disturbed.

== Description ==
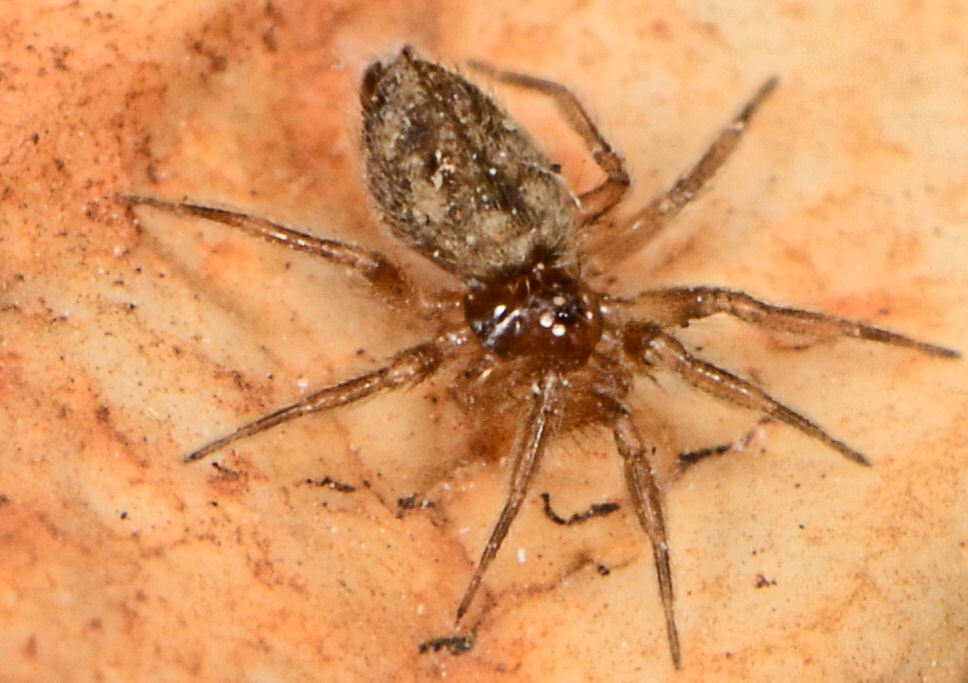
female

== Conservation ==
Paroecobius nicolaii is listed as Data Deficient by the South African National Biodiversity Institute. The species is under-collected and more sampling is needed to determine its range. There are no known threats to the species.

== Taxonomy ==
The species was described by Wunderlich in 1995, based on material collected from tree bark at Nylstroom (now Modimolle), South Africa.
