= Bevonotra =

- Location in Madagascar
- Coordinates: 14°3′S 49°37′E
- Country: Madagascar
- Region: Sava
- District: Sambava
- Elevation: 351 m (1,152 ft)

Population (2001)
  - Total: 16,000
- Time zone: UTC3 (EAT)

Bevonotra is a town and commune (Malagasy: kaominina) in northern Madagascar. It belongs to the district of Sambava, which is a part of Sava Region. The population of the commune was estimated to be approximately 16,000 in 2001 commune census.

Only primary schooling is available in town. The majority 98% of the population in the commune are farmers. The most important crops are rice and vanilla, while other important agricultural products are coffee, sugarcane and beans. Services provide employment for 2% of the population.
