= Zomandao River =

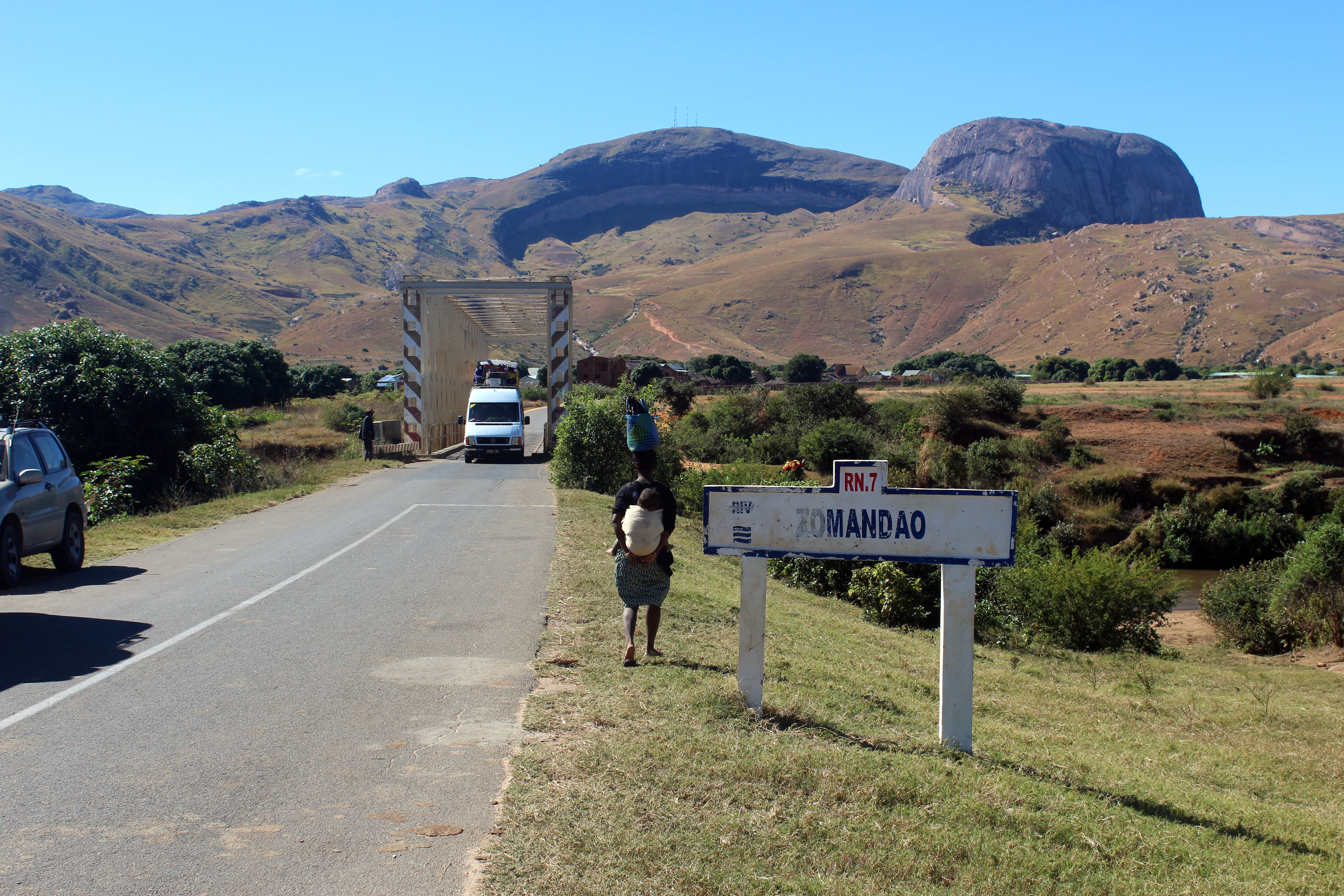
- Zomandao

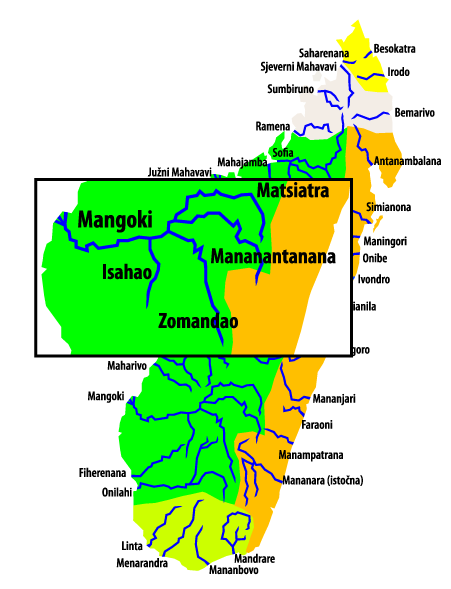
- Map of the Mangoky and Zomandao rivers

Location
- Country: Madagascar
- Region: Haute Matsiatra, Ihorombe
- Cities: Fenoarivo Atsinanana, Ihosy

Physical characteristics
- Source
  - location: Andringitra Massif, Pic Boby, Haute Matsiatra
  - elevation: 2,600 m (8,500 ft)
- Mouth: Mangoky river
  - location: between Bekininy and Sakananjy, Ihorombe
  - coordinates: 21°35′45″S 45°24′44″E
  - elevation: 193 m (633 ft)
- Length: 283 km (176 mi)
- Basin size: 10,300 km^{2} (4,000 sq mi)

Basin features
- Tributaries
  - left: Sohanambo River, Ihosy

The Zomandao River is a 283-km-long river in the regions of Haute Matsiatra and Ihorombe in central-southern Madagascar. It begins in the Andringitra Massif at Boby Peak, the second highest peak of Madagascar, and flows across the Zomandao Plain. It is one of the main tributaries of the Mangoky River. It has some waterfalls, including the Riandahy Falls and Rianbavy Falls.

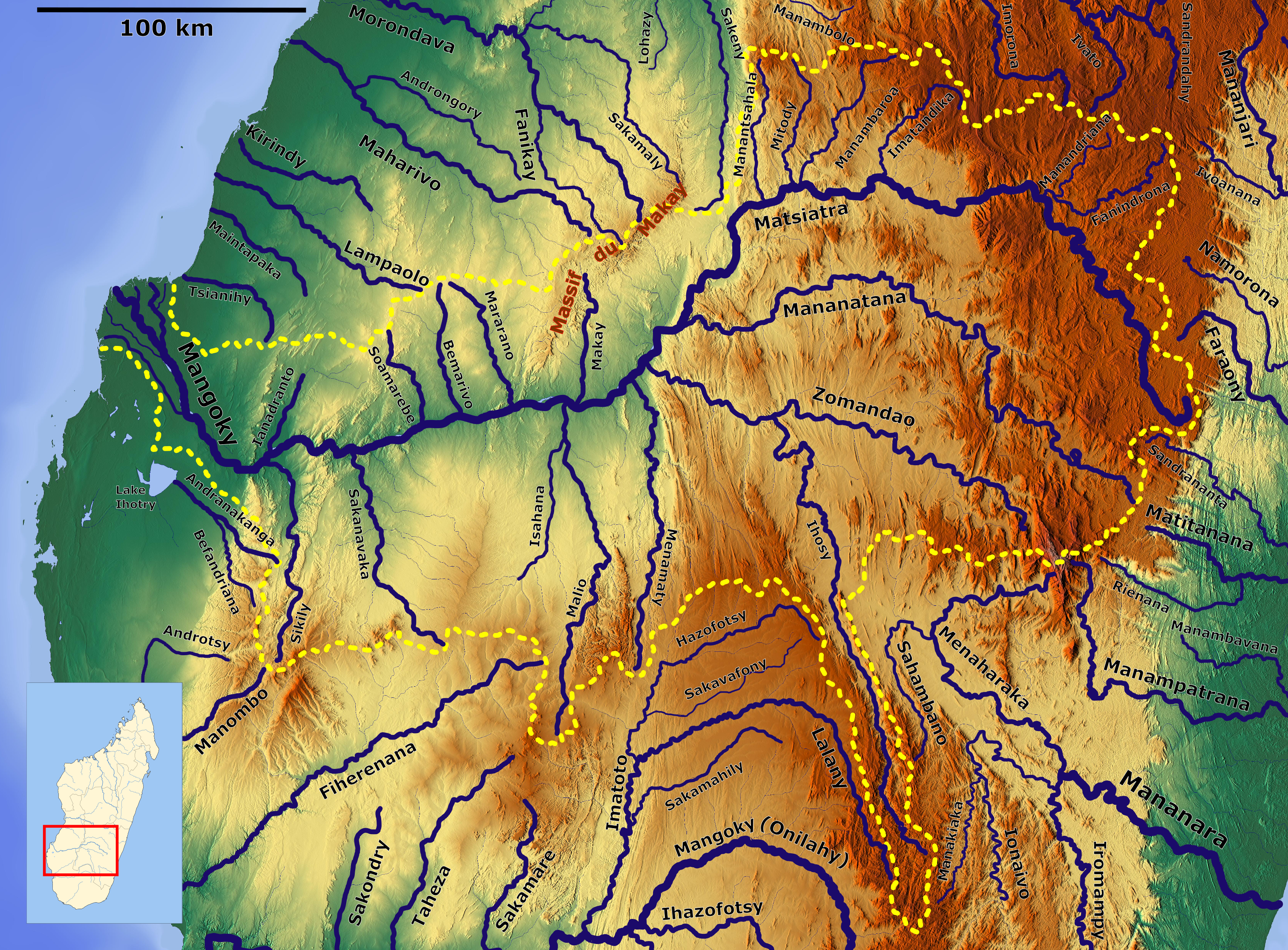
Mangoky Bassin

A main attribute to the Zomandao River is the Ihosy River.
