= Antsahavaribe, Sambava =

Antsahavaribe
- Location in Madagascar
- Coordinates: 13°59′S 49°37′E
- Country: Madagascar
- Region: Sava
- District: Sambava
- Elevation: 659 m (2,162 ft)

Population (2001)
  - Total: 17,000
- Time zone: UTC3 (EAT)
- Postal code

Antsahavaribe is a town and commune (Malagasy: kaominina) in northern Madagascar. It belongs to the district of Sambava, which is a part of Sava Region. The population of the commune was estimated to be approximately 17,000 in 2001 commune census.

Only primary schooling is available. The majority 90% of the population of the commune are farmers, while an additional 8% receives their livelihood from raising livestock. The most important crop is vanilla, while other important products are coffee, cassava and rice. Services provide employment for 2% of the population.
