= Ambodivoara =

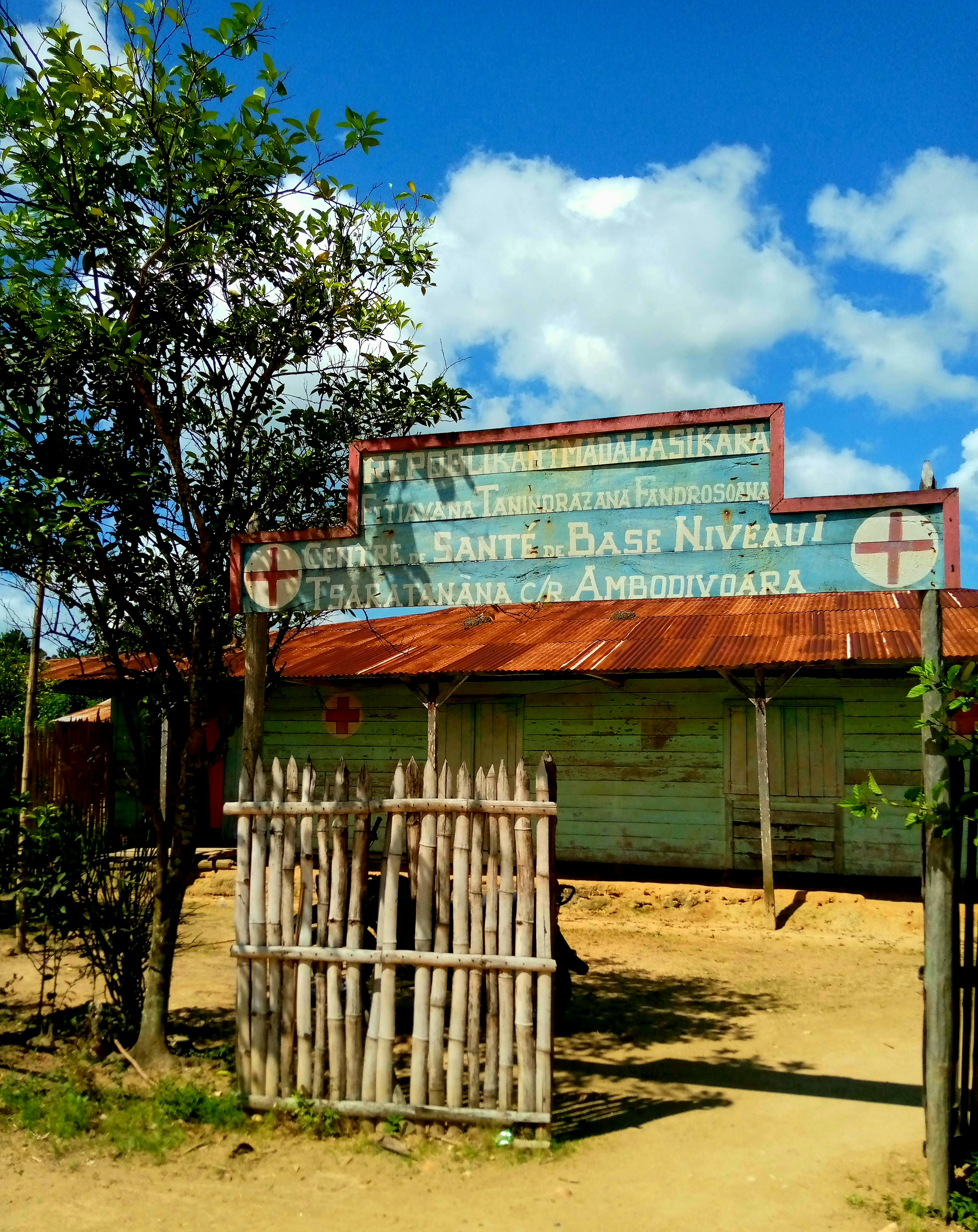

- Location in Madagascar
- Coordinates: 14°24′S 49°57′E
- Country: Madagascar
- Region: Sava
- District: Sambava
- Elevation: 177 m (581 ft)

Population (2001)
  - Total: 10,000
- Time zone: UTC3 (EAT)

Ambodivoara is a town and commune (Malagasy: kaominina) in northern Madagascar. It belongs to the district of Sambava, which is a part of Sava Region. The population of the commune was estimated to be approximately 10,000 in 2001 commune census.

Primary and junior level secondary education are available in town. The majority 98% of the population in the commune are farmers, while an additional 1% receives their livelihood from raising livestock. The most important crop is vanilla, while other important products are coffee and rice. Services provide employment for 1% of the population.
