= Andrahanjo =

- Location in Madagascar
- Coordinates: 14°18′S 49°49′E
- Country: Madagascar
- Region: Sava
- District: Sambava
- Elevation: 127 m (417 ft)

Population (2001)
  - Total: 8,000
- Time zone: UTC3 (EAT)

Andrahanjo is a town and commune (Malagasy: kaominina) in northern Madagascar. It belongs to the district of Sambava, which is a part of Sava Region. The population of the commune was estimated to be approximately 8,000 in 2001 commune census.

Only primary schooling is available in town. The vast majority of the population in the commune are farmers. The most important crop is vanilla, while other important products are coffee, beans and rice.
