= Betsiboka Bridge =

Bridge in Madagascar

- Coordinates: 16.9380°S 46.9512°E
- Carries: RN 4
- Crosses: Betsiboka River

Characteristics
- Total length: ≈350 meters
- No. of lanes: 2

Location
- Interactive map of Betsiboka Bridge

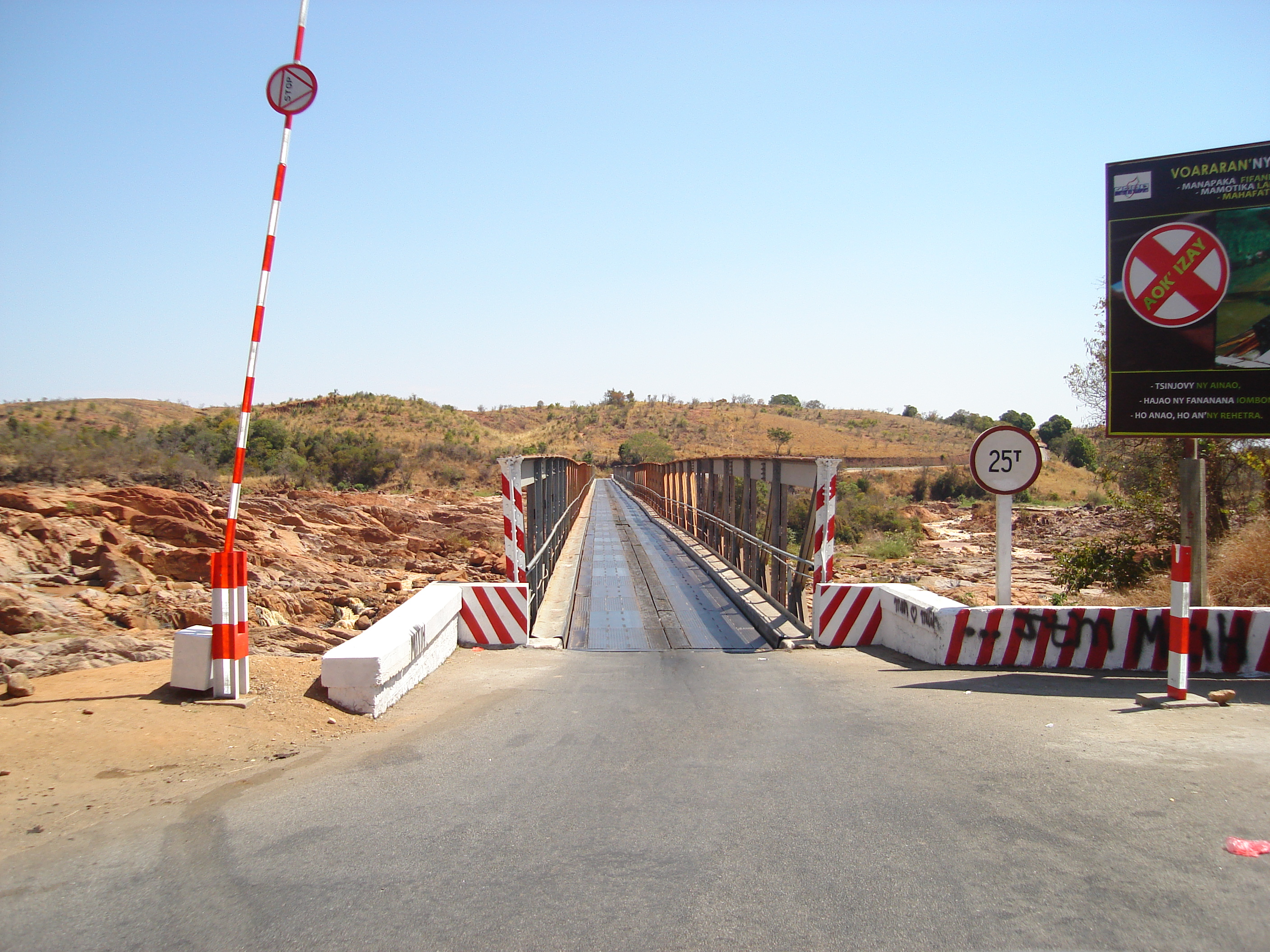
Betsiboka Bridge

The Betsiboka Bridge is a truss bridge over the Betsiboka River, in the district of Maevatanana, which is a part of Betsiboka Region, Madagascar. It is one of the longest bridge on the island, appr. 350 meters long.

== History ==
The first bridge was one of the three suspension bridges erected in Madagascar by the French company G. Leinekugel Le Cocq & Fils between 1931 and 1934.

It was destroyed in World War II and, thereafter, replaced by the present truss bridge which was refurbished in 1980 and rehabilitated in 2015.

== See also ==
- List of rivers of Madagascar
