= Analamaho =

- Location in Madagascar
- Coordinates: 14°12′S 49°57′E
- Country: Madagascar
- Region: Sava
- District: Sambava
- Elevation: 112 m (367 ft)

Population (2001)
  - Total: 6,000
- Time zone: UTC3 (EAT)

Analamaho is a town and commune (Malagasy: kaominina) in northern Madagascar. It belongs to the district of Sambava, which is a part of Sava Region. The population of the commune was estimated to be approximately 6,000 in 2001 commune census.

Only primary schooling is available in town. The majority 90% of the population in the commune are farmers. The most important crop is vanilla, while other important products are coffee and rice. Services provide employment for 10% of the population.
