= Morafeno, Sambava =

Morafeno
- Location in Madagascar
- Coordinates: 14°24′S 50°2′E
- Country: Madagascar
- Region: Sava
- District: Sambava

Population (2001)
  - Total: 9,000
- Time zone: UTC3 (EAT)

Morafeno is a town and commune (Malagasy: kaominina) in northern Madagascar. It belongs to the district of Sambava, which is a part of Sava Region. It is located at the Fanambana River.

The population of the commune was estimated to be approximately 9,000 in 2001 commune census.

Only primary schooling is available in town. The majority 99.9% of the population the commune are farmers. The most important crop is vanilla, while other important products are coffee, cloves and rice. Services provide employment for 0.1% of the population.
