= Ambohimalaza, Sambava =

Ambohimalaza
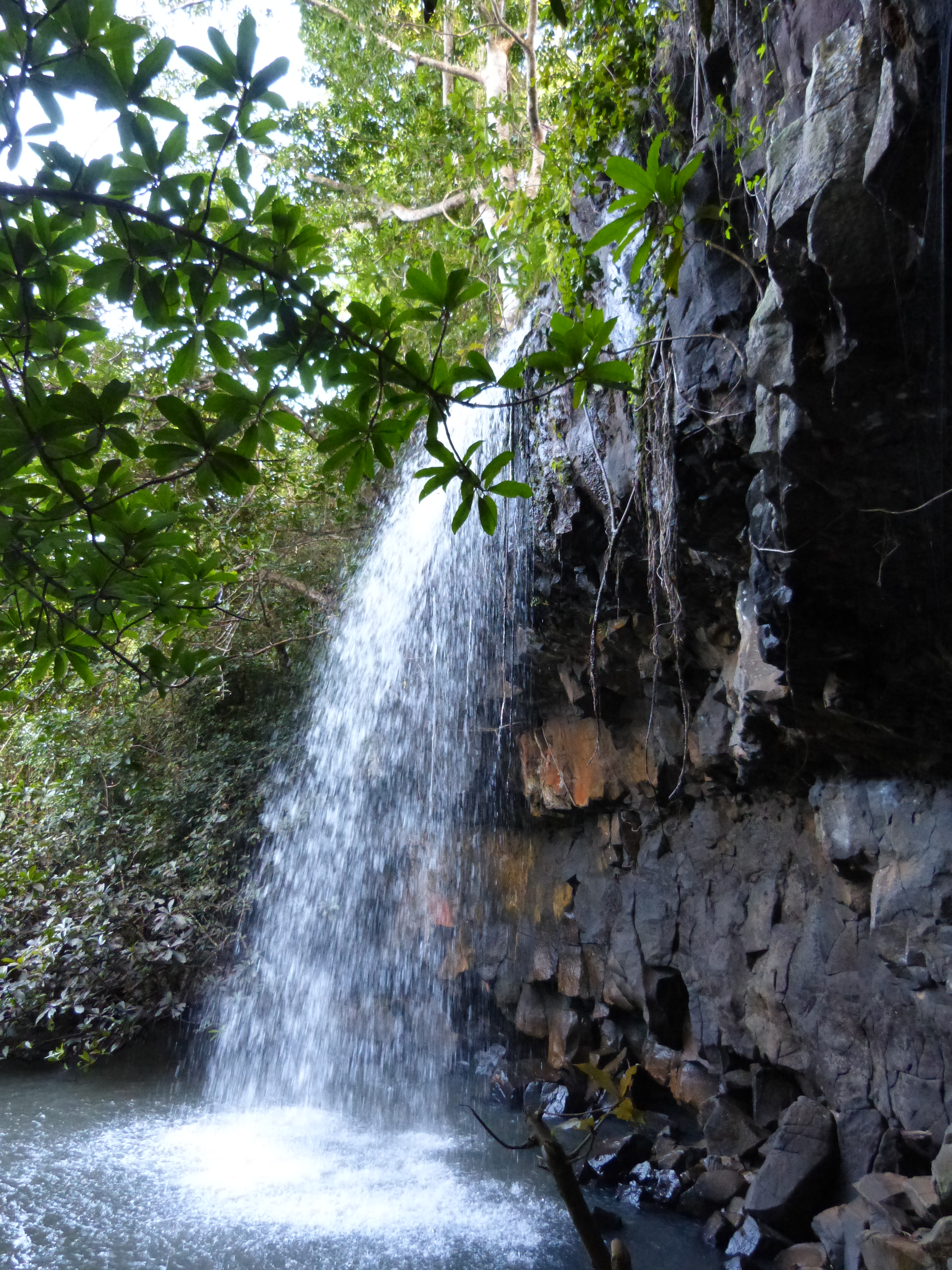
- Andriagnambo falls in Ambariomiambana, a fokontany of Ambohimalaza

- Location in Madagascar
- Coordinates: 14°19′S 50°3′E
- Country: Madagascar
- Region: Sava
- District: Sambava

Population (2001)
  - Total: 8,000
- Time zone: UTC3 (EAT)
- Postal code: 208

Ambohimalaza is a municipality in northern Madagascar. It belongs to the district of Sambava, which is a part of Sava Region. The population of the commune was estimated to be approximately 8,000 in 2001 commune census.

Only primary schooling is available in town. The majority 99.99% of the population in the commune are farmers. The most important crop is vanilla, while other important products are coffee, cloves and rice. Services provide employment for 0.01% of the population.

== Geography ==
It is situated along the National road 3b between Antalaha and Andapa. The small Sambava river flows in the North of the village.
