= Robert Everard (sailor) =

English castaway and former slave

- Born: England
- Occupations: Sailor, Slave
- Employer: Bauden (slave ship)
- Known for: Surviving slavery and captivity in Madagascar
- Parent: William Everard

Robert Everard (fl. 1686–1693) was an English sailor known for surviving extreme hardships after being stranded in Madagascar as the slave of a Malagasy king in the late 17th century.

== Biography ==
Robert Everard, bound in his youth by his father as apprentice to Captain Crib of the slaver Bauden, faced immediate hardships when the ship left London on 5 August 1686, bound for Bombay, India. On the voyage, the ship was attacked by pirates. Everard hid during the fight and survived, though he was wounded, while many crew members, including his captain, were killed. The ship eventually reached Bombay before continuing to Assada (now Nosy Be), Madagascar .

In 1686, Everard survived the Assada Massacre, during which both the men sent ashore and the ship were attacked by the Malagasy. Most of his companions were killed, and Everard survived and was enslaved by the local king.

For nearly three years, he lived naked and in misery, enduring rain, sores, exposure, and humiliation at the hands of the local natives. He was forced to accompany the king on raids and to serve in harsh conditions, suffering severe injuries, including burns on his back. He survived by eating yams, potatoes, crabs, fish, and sea turtles, often digging or hunting with no tools or clothing.

Eventually, an Arab purchased Everard from the king for twenty dollars and treated him kindly. He was placed on a small open vessel with slaves and ivory, bound for Muscat. The voyage was stormy and lasted over a month, with scarce food and water. Upon arrival at Muscat, English residents recognised him after he explained that he had belonged to the Bauden. He then began to relearn English, having forgotten it during his time in Madagascar.

After several years of travel across the Indian Ocean, Everard finally returned to Blackwall, England, in 1693, reuniting with his father after seven years.

== See also ==
- Robert Drury (sailor), an English sailor who was enslaved by the natives in Madagascar.
