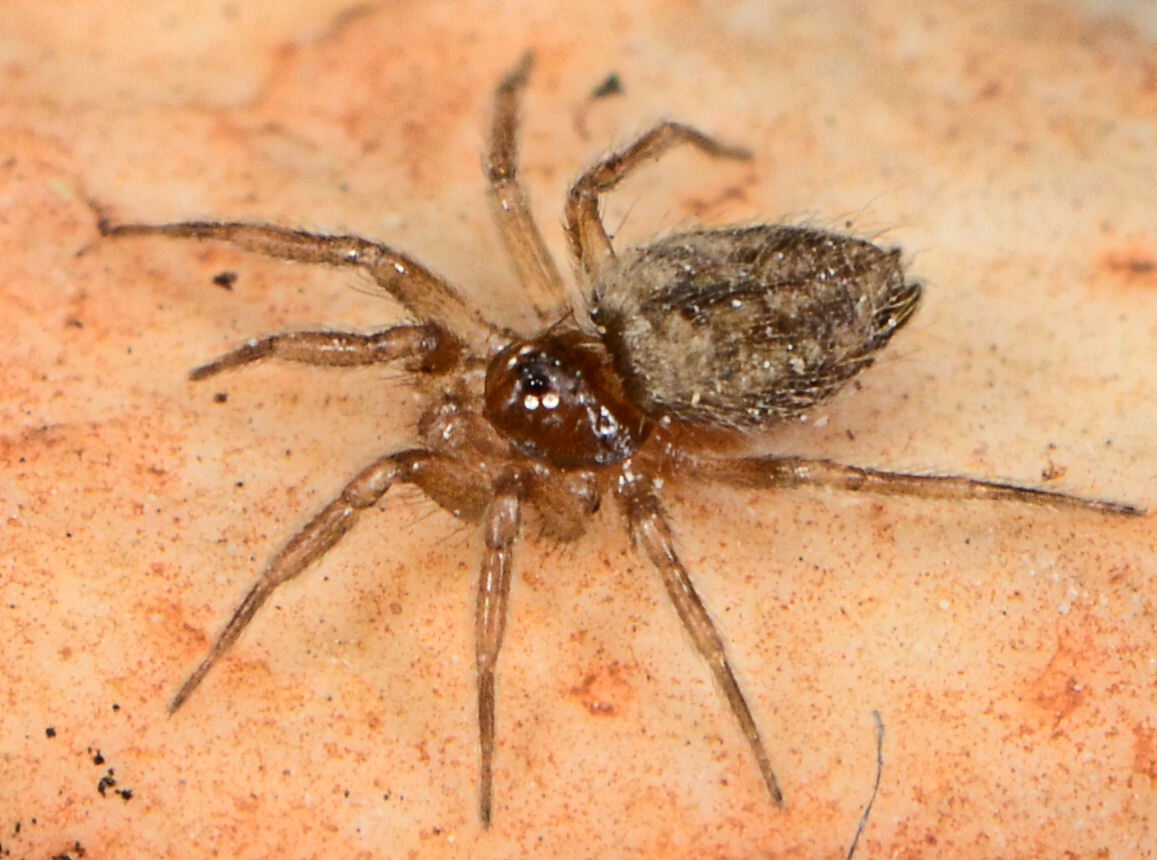
- Female P. nicolaii
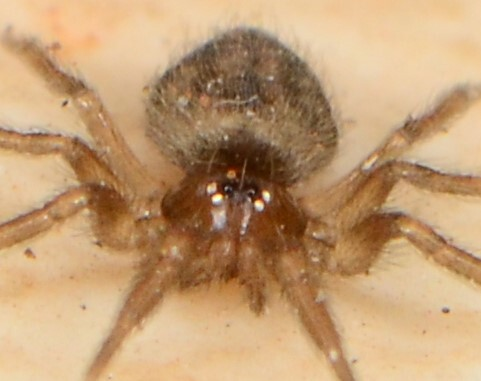
- Female P. nicolaii

Scientific classification
- Kingdom: Animalia
- Phylum: Arthropoda
- Subphylum: Chelicerata
- Class: Arachnida
- Order: Araneae
- Infraorder: Araneomorphae
- Family: Oecobiidae
- Genus: Paroecobius; Lamoral

Species
- 5, see text

= Paroecobius =

Genus of spiders

Paroecobius is a genus of spiders in the family Oecobiidae. It was first described in 1981 by Lamoral. All five described species are found in southern Africa and Madagascar.

== Species ==
As of September 2025, the genus contains five species:

- Paroecobius nicolaii Wunderlich, 1995 - South Africa
- Paroecobius private Magalhães & Santos, 2018 - Madagascar
- Paroecobius rico Magalhães & Santos, 2018 - Madagascar
- Paroecobius skipper Magalhães & Santos, 2018 - Madagascar
- Paroecobius wilmotae Lamoral, 1981 - Botswana (type species)
