= Paroecobius rico =

Scientific classification
- Kingdom: Animalia
- Phylum: Arthropoda
- Subphylum: Chelicerata
- Class: Arachnida
- Order: Araneae
- Infraorder: Araneomorphae
- Family: Oecobiidae
- Genus: Paroecobius
- Species: P. rico

Binomial name
- Paroecobius rico Magalhães & Santos, 2018

Species of spider

Paroecobius rico is a species of spider in the family Oecobiidae. The body is mostly pale yellow, with dark grey and black spots. It is known only from the holotype. The species is native to Madagascar.

Paroecobius rico was described in 2018, and is named after a character from the film Penguins of Madagascar.

== Taxonomy ==
The species was described by Mayara Drumond Faustino Magalhães and Adalberto José dos Santos in 2018.

The holotype, a female, is kept at the California Academy of Sciences. The holotype was collected near the Isantoria river, in January or February of 2002.

== Distribution ==
Paroecobius rico is native to Madagascar. It has been collected in Toliara Province.

Prior to the discovery of Paroecobius rico, Paroecobius skipper, and Paroecobius private, the genus Paroecobius was only known to be found in Botswana and South Africa.

== Description ==
Paroecobius rico has only been described from the holotype, a female. The females have a hood on the epigyne, which is similar to that found in Paroecobius skipper. The hood is harder than that of other species in the genus. The copulatory opening and hood are elongated.

The carapace is pale yellow, with darker margins, and suffused with dark grey. The clypeus has a rounded projection with dark grey spots. The chelicerae, labium, endites, and sternum, pedipalps, and legs are pale yellow. The abdomen is pale yellow, with dark grey stripes, and black spots on the upperside. The spinnerets are pale yellow, and darker at the apex. The spermathecae have an internal glandular chamber. The males may deposit a mating plug inside the females.

The anterior median eyes are the largest eyes. They are dark, and surrounded by a black ring. The other eyes are translucent.

The holotype is 1.47 millimetres (0.058 in) long. The carapace is 0.48 millimetres (0.019 in) long, and 0.53 millimetres (0.021 in) wide. The abdomen is 0.99 millimetres (0.039 in) long, and 0.76 millimetres (0.030 in) wide.

== Etymology ==
The specific epithet rico refers to Rico, a character from the film Penguins of Madagascar. In the same paper, the describing authors named Oecobius kowalskii, Paroecobius skipper, and Paroecobius private after other characters from the film.
