= Paroecobius skipper =

Scientific classification
- Kingdom: Animalia
- Phylum: Arthropoda
- Subphylum: Chelicerata
- Class: Arachnida
- Order: Araneae
- Infraorder: Araneomorphae
- Family: Oecobiidae
- Genus: Paroecobius
- Species: P. skipper

Binomial name
- Paroecobius skipper Magalhães & Santos, 2018

Species of spider

Paroecobius skipper is a species of spider in the family Oecobiidae. The body is mostly yellow, with some darker spots. The species is native to Madagascar.

Paroecobius skipper was described in 2018, and is named after a character from the film Penguins of Madagascar.

== Taxonomy ==
The species was described by Mayara Drumond Faustino Magalhães and Adalberto José dos Santos in 2018.

The holotype (a male) and paratype (a female) are kept at the California Academy of Sciences. The specimens were collected from Madagascar's Toliara Province in 2002, near Ifotaka.

== Distribution ==
Paroecobius skipper is native to Madagascar. It has been collected in Andohahela National Park, Toliara Province.

Prior to the discovery of Paroecobius skipper, Paroecobius rico, and Paroecobius private, the genus Paroecobius was only known to be found in Botswana and South Africa.

== Description ==
Unlike in other species of Paroecobius, the males of Paroecobius skipper have a hook-shaped apophysis and prominent keel on the tegulum. The females have a hardened hood on the epigyne, which is similar to that found in Paroecobius rico. The epigyne is translucent, and has a groove on the anterior. The copulatory opening is anterior to the hood.

The carapace is pale yellow, and darker at the margins. Male have a black spot in the cephalic region of the carapace. The upperside of the abdomen is pale yellow with black spots in males, and dark grey with pairs of yellow spots in females. The chelicerae, labium, endites, sternum, pedipalps, and legs are pale yellow.

The anterior median eyes are the largest, black, and surrounded by a black ring. The other eyes are translucent.

The males are 1.2 millimetres (0.047 in) long. The carapace of males is 0.46 millimetres (0.018 in) long, and 0.51 millimetres (0.020 in) wide. The females are 1.3 millimetres (0.051 in) long. The carapace of females is 0.48 millimetres (0.019 in) long, and 0.53 millimetres (0.021 in) wide.

== Etymology ==
The specific epithet skipper refers to Skipper, a character from the film Penguins of Madagascar. In the same paper, the describing authors named Oecobius kowalskii, Paroecobius rico, and Paroecobius private, after other characters from the film.
