= Anjangoveratra =

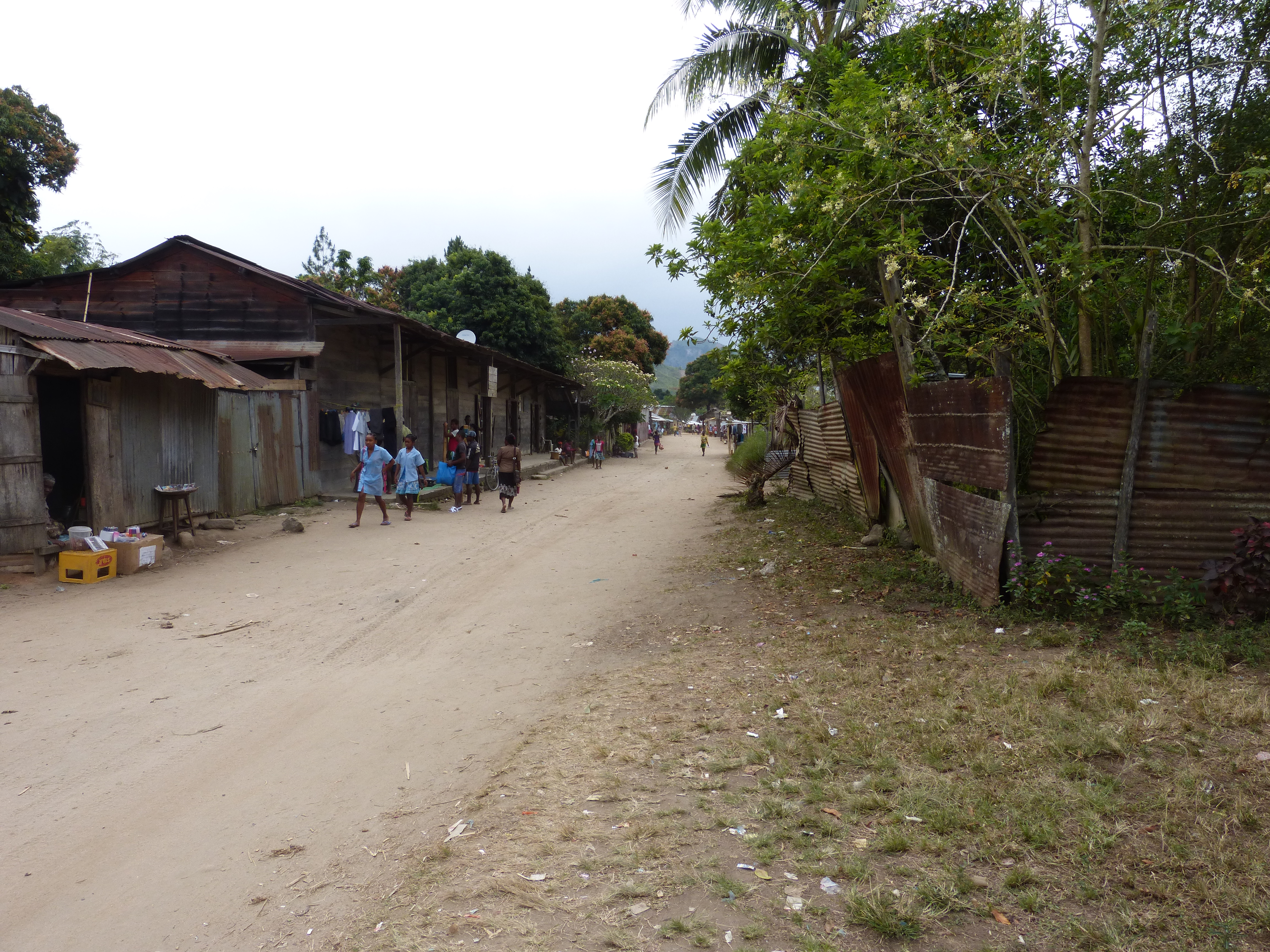
- central road in Antanandava, a village of this municipality

- Location in Madagascar
- Coordinates: 14°8′S 50°5′E
- Country: Madagascar
- Region: Sava
- District: Sambava

Population (2001)
  - Total: 16,000
- Time zone: UTC3 (EAT)

Anjangoveratra is a town and commune (Malagasy: kaominina) in northern Madagascar. It belongs to the district of Sambava, which is a part of Sava Region. The population of the commune was estimated to be approximately 16,000 in 2001 commune census.

Primary and junior level secondary education are available in town. The majority 98.5% of the population in the commune are farmers, while an additional 1% receives their livelihood from raising livestock. The most important crop is vanilla, while other important products are pineapple and rice. Services provide employment for 0.5% of the population.
