= Ambatoafo =

- Location in Madagascar
- Coordinates: 14°7′S 49°41′E
- Country: Madagascar
- Region: Sava
- District: Sambava
- Elevation: 336 m (1,102 ft)

Population (2001)
  - Total: 6,000
- Time zone: UTC3 (EAT)

Ambatoafo is a town and commune (Malagasy: kaominina) in northern Madagascar. It belongs to the district of Sambava, which is a part of Sava Region. The population of the commune was estimated to be approximately 6,000 in 2001 commune census.

Only primary schooling is available in town. The majority 99% of the population are farmers. The most important crop is vanilla, while other important products are coffee, beans and rice. Services provide employment for 1% of the population.
