= Assada Massacre =

Assada massacre
- Location: Assada Island, Madagascar
- Date: 1686
- Target: English traders from the ship Bauden
- Attack type: Massacre
- Deaths: Captain and several crewmen
- Perpetrator: Malagasy natives

The Assada massacre was an attack by local Malagasy inhabitants on the English slave ship Bauden and its shore party in Nosy Be, then known as Assada Island, in 1686.

== Background ==
The Bauden was a slave trading vessel operating in the Indian Ocean in the late seventeenth century. During one of its voyages, it sailed from India toward the northwest coast of Madagascar to obtain enslaved people for trade. Upon reaching Assada Island (modern Nosy Be), the ship anchored offshore to begin negotiations with local Malagasy communities.

== The massacre ==
When the Bauden reached Assada Island, the captain sent a shore party of five men and the apprentice Robert Everard to begin trading for slaves. They carried their wares—guns, pistols, powder, shot, and knives—to a small house prepared for the exchange. The local Malagasy brought them food, and for a short time all seemed peaceful. The English, unaware of their peril, sat waiting, thinking a noise outside signaled the approach of the local ruler. Instead, an angry crowd of armed villagers burst in, wielding lances. All five men were instantly killed, one of whom in his fall accidentally struck Everard to the ground, sparing his life. The supercargo attempted to flee toward the king’s quarters but was stabbed through the belly and killed. The man guarding the boat was also slain, leaving Everard alone among the attackers.

At the same moment, a second tragedy unfolded aboard the Bauden. Several Malagasy men who had come aboard in a canoe to entice the captain ashore were secretly armed with short lances concealed beneath their clothes. While the captain dined with the mate, purser, and several others, the visitors suddenly turned on them, cutting the captain's throat and killing the mate and purser in a violent surprise attack. The ship’s doctor managed to save himself by leaping into the gun-room and barring the door, where he armed the surviving crew. After fierce fighting and the loss of nine or ten men, the English managed to drive the attackers off and regain control of the ship. Believing no one from the shore party had survived, they fired several rounds toward the village and then set sail, unknowingly leaving Everard alive and stranded on Assada.

== Aftermath ==
Everard remained stranded on Assada for nearly three years, enslaved by the local Malagasy king. He was humiliated, forced to scavenge for roots, yams, crabs, and fish, slept naked on the bare ground, and endured constant exposure to rain. Eventually, an Arab merchant purchased him for twenty dollars and later sold him to an Englishman, who freed him.

== See also ==
- Massacre of Fort-Dauphin (Madagascar)
