= Antindra =

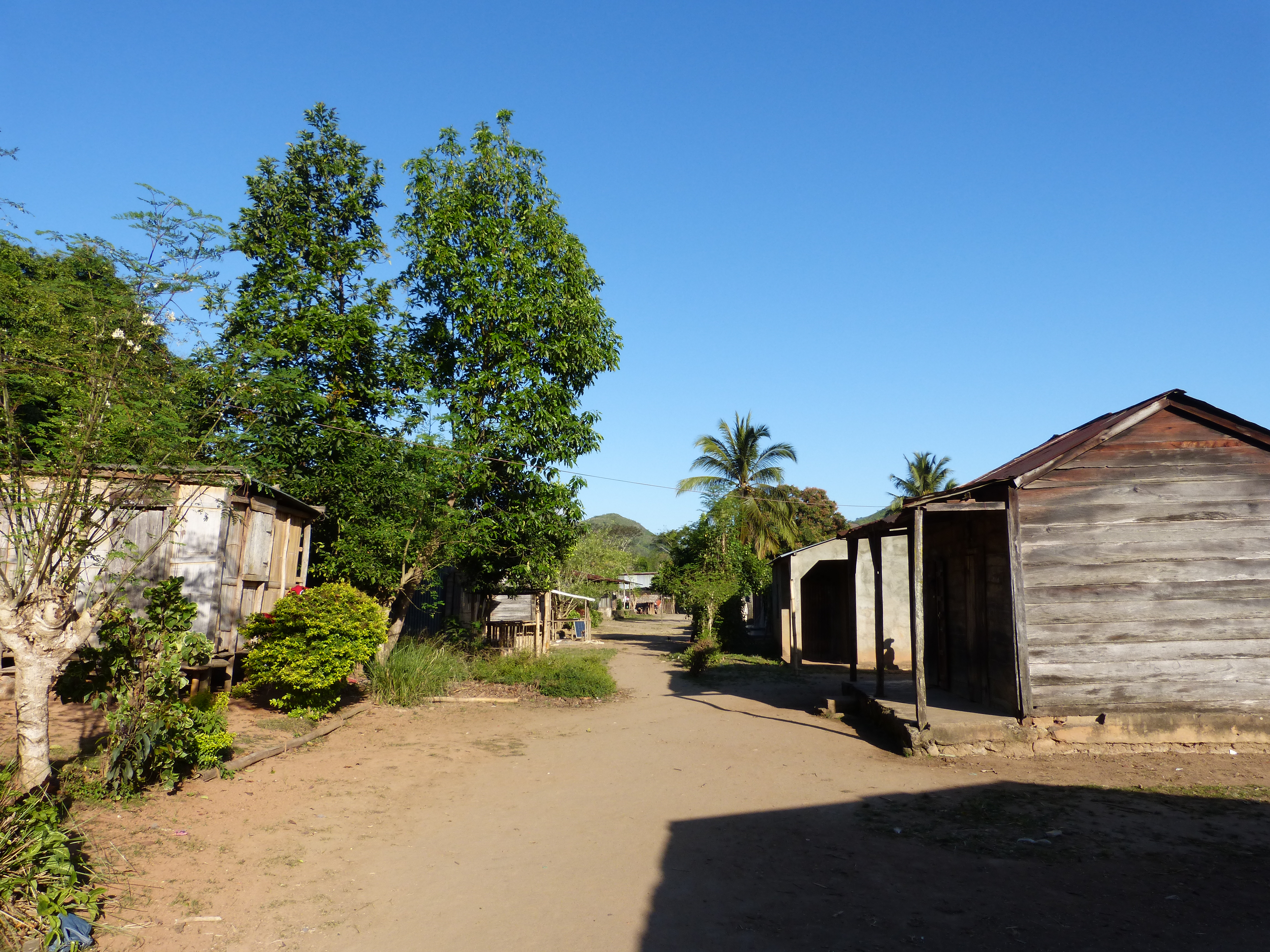
- Atindra

- Location in Madagascar
- Coordinates: 14°8′S 49°49′E
- Country: Madagascar
- Region: Sava
- District: Sambava
- Elevation: 90 m (300 ft)

Population (2001)
  - Total: 16,000
- Time zone: UTC3 (EAT)
- Postal code: 208

Antindra is a municipality in northern Madagascar. It belongs to the district of Sambava, which is a part of Sava Region. The population of the commune was estimated to be approximately 16,000 in 2001 commune census.

Only primary schooling is available in town. The majority 98% of the population in the commune are farmers. The most important crops are rice and vanilla, while other important agricultural products are coffee and sugarcane. Services provide employment for 2% of the population.

== River ==
Atindra is situated at the Bemarivo River.
