= Sambava District =

- District
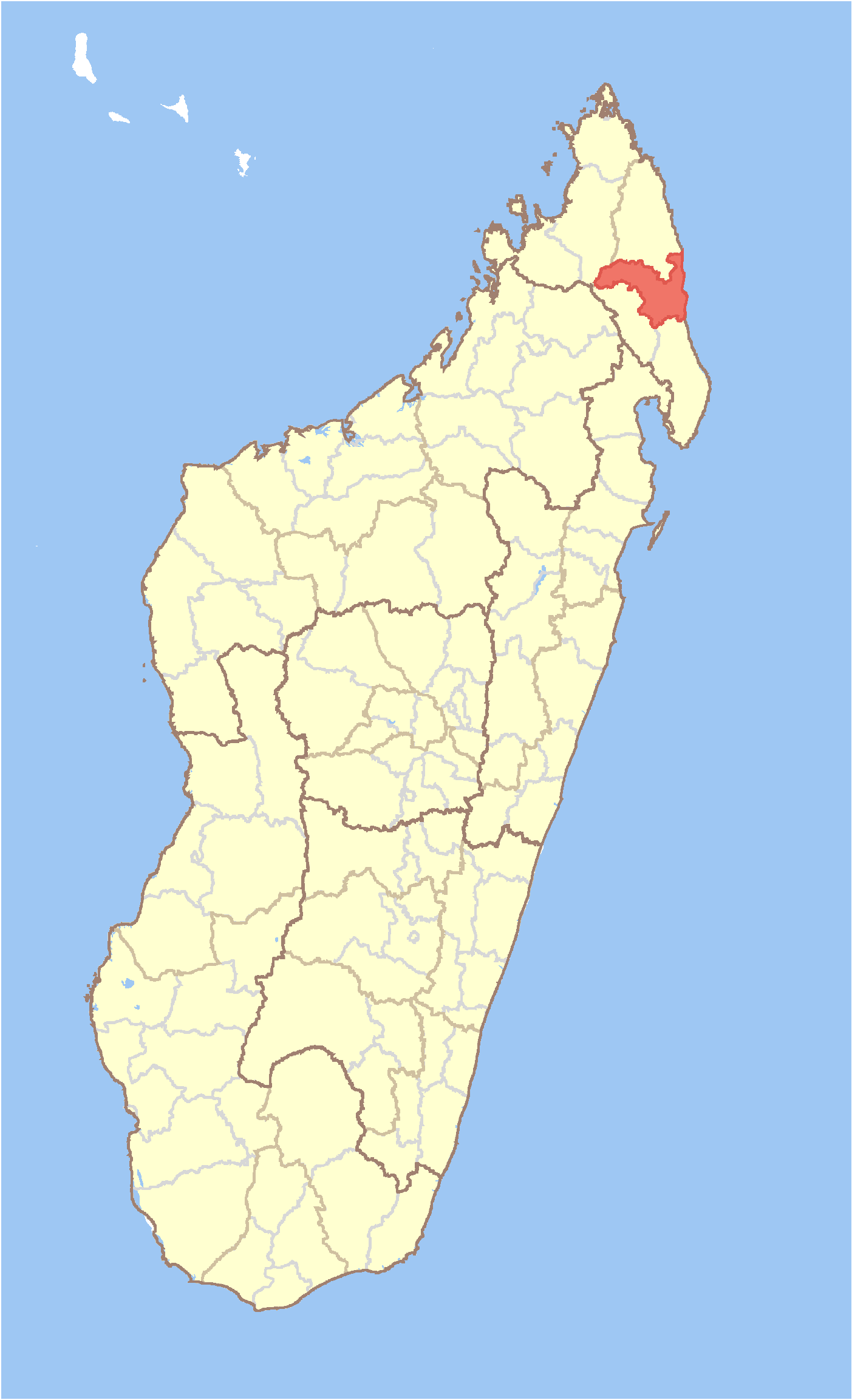
- Location in Madagascar
- Coordinates: 14°10′S 49°47′E
- Country: Madagascar
- Region: Sava

Area
  - Total: 4,681.76 km^{2} (1,807.64 sq mi)

Population (2020)
  - Total: 429,947
  - Density: 91.8345/km^{2} (237.850/sq mi)
- Time zone: UTC3 (EAT)
- Postal code: 208

Sambava District is a district in northern Madagascar. It is a part of Sava Region and borders the districts of Antalaha to the south, Andapa to the south-west, Ambilobe to the north-west and Iharana to the north. The area is 4,681.76 km^{2} (1,808 sq mi) and the population was estimated to be 429,947 in 2020.

== Communes ==
The district is further divided into 25 communes:

- Ambatoafo
- Amboangibe
- Ambodiampana
- Ambodivoara
- Ambohimalaza
- Ambohimitsinjo
- Analamaho
- Andrahanjo
- Andratamarina
- Anjangoveratra
- Anjialava
- Anjinjaomby
- Antindra
- Antsahambaharo
- Antsahavaribe
- Bemanevika
- Bevonotra
- Farahalana
- Maroambiny
- Marogaona
- Marojala
- Morafeno
- Nosiarina
- Sambava
- Tanambao Daoud
