= Anjialava =

- Location in Madagascar
- Coordinates: 14°4′S 49°44′E
- Country: Madagascar
- Region: Sava
- District: Sambava
- Elevation: 212 m (696 ft)

Population (2001)
  - Total: 9,000
- Time zone: UTC3 (EAT)
- Postal code: 208

Anjialava is a rural municipality in northern Madagascar. It belongs to the district of Sambava, which is a part of Sava Region. The population of the commune was estimated to be approximately 9,000 in 2001 commune census.

Only primary schooling is available in town. The majority 99.99% of the population in the commune are farmers. The most important crops are rice and vanilla, while other important agricultural products are coffee and beans. Services provide employment for 0.01% of the population.

== Geography ==
This village is situated north of Sambava on the banks of the Bemarivo River.
