= Marojala =

- Location in Madagascar
- Coordinates: 14°29′S 50°2′E
- Country: Madagascar
- Region: Sava
- District: Sambava

Population (2001)
  - Total: 13,000
- Time zone: UTC3 (EAT)

Marojala is a town and commune (Malagasy: kaominina) in northern Madagascar. It belongs to the district of Sambava, which is a part of Sava Region. At the time of the 2001 commune census, the population was estimated to be approximately 13,000.

Only primary schooling is available in town. Most of the population in the commune are farmers. The most important crop is vanilla, while other important products are coffee, cloves and rice. Services provide employment for 0.01% of the population.
