= Andranotsimisiamalona River =

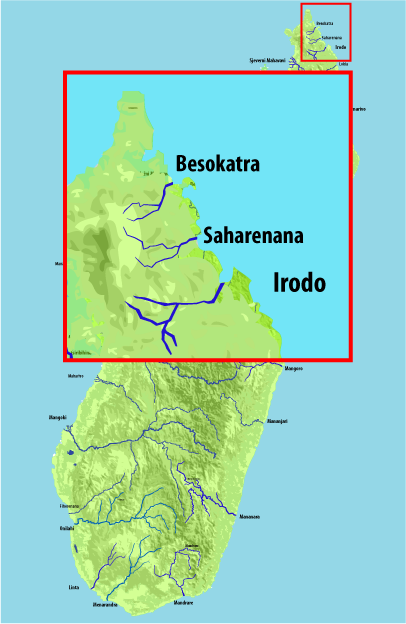
- Ambohitra Massif river system

Location
- Country: Madagascar
- Region: Diana

Physical characteristics
- Source
  - location: Ambohitra Massif, Diana
  - elevation: 1,354 m (4,442 ft)
- Mouth: Saharenana River
  - location: Diana
  - coordinates: 12°28′00″S 49°21′20″E
  - elevation: 100 m (330 ft)
- Length: 51.2 km (31.8 mi)
- Basin size: 59.9 km^{2} (23.1 sq mi)
- Discharge
  - location: near Antananandrenitelo
  - average: 0.38 m^{3}/s (13 cu ft/s)
  - minimum: 0.128 m^{3}/s (4.5 cu ft/s)
  - maximum: 2.42 m^{3}/s (85 cu ft/s)

The Andranotsimisiamalona River is located in northern Madagascar. Its sources are situated in the Ambohitra Massif; it flows into the Saharenana River above Antananandrenitelo.
