= Lokoho River =

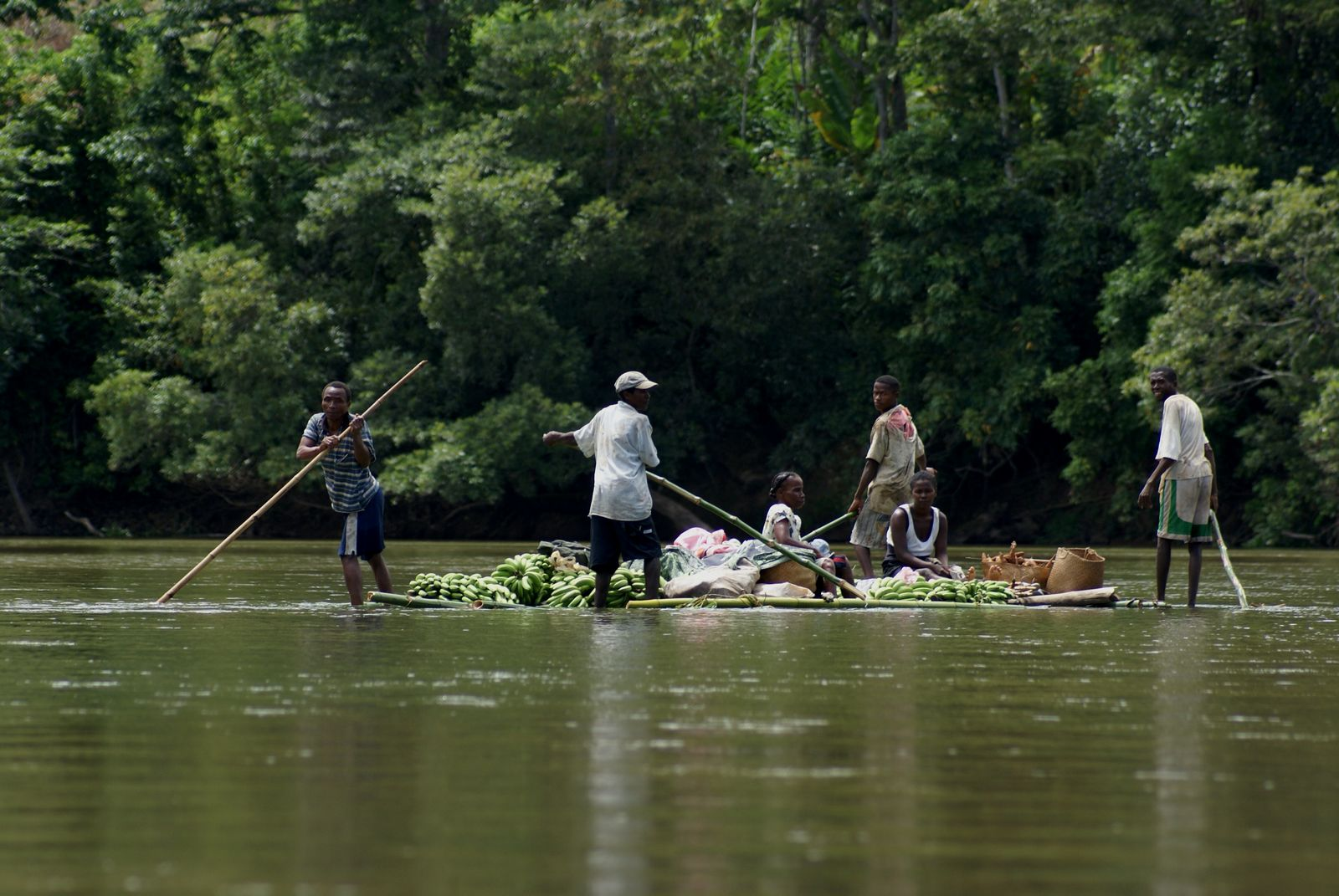
- Lokoho river

Location
- Country: Madagascar
- Region: Sava
- Cities: Farahalana, Marojala

Physical characteristics
- Source
  - elevation: 2,100 m (6,900 ft)
- Mouth
  - location: Farahalana, Indian Ocean
  - coordinates: 14°25′00″S 50°10′43″E
- Length: 150 km (93 mi)
- Basin size: 2,237 km^{2} (864 sq mi)
- Discharge
  - location: Near mouth
  - average: (Period: 1971–2000)86.1 m^{3}/s (3,040 cu ft/s)

Basin features
- River system: Lokoho River
- Tributaries
  - left: Ankaibe

The Lokoho River is located in northern Madagascar. It drains to the north-east coast, into the Indian Ocean. It drains the southern half of the Marojejy Massif. Its mouth is situated 25 km in the south of Sambava, near Farahalana.

There were some projects for the installation of hydroelectric power plants by Jirama in the 1970s, but they were never completed.

In 2002 another project, for a plant of 6 kW capacity by Jirama in cooperation with the French EDF, German RWE, GTZ and Canadian Hydro-Québec, was launched. It was stopped in 2009 due to the Malagasy political crisis.
