= Ihosy River =

River in Fianarantsoa, Madagascar

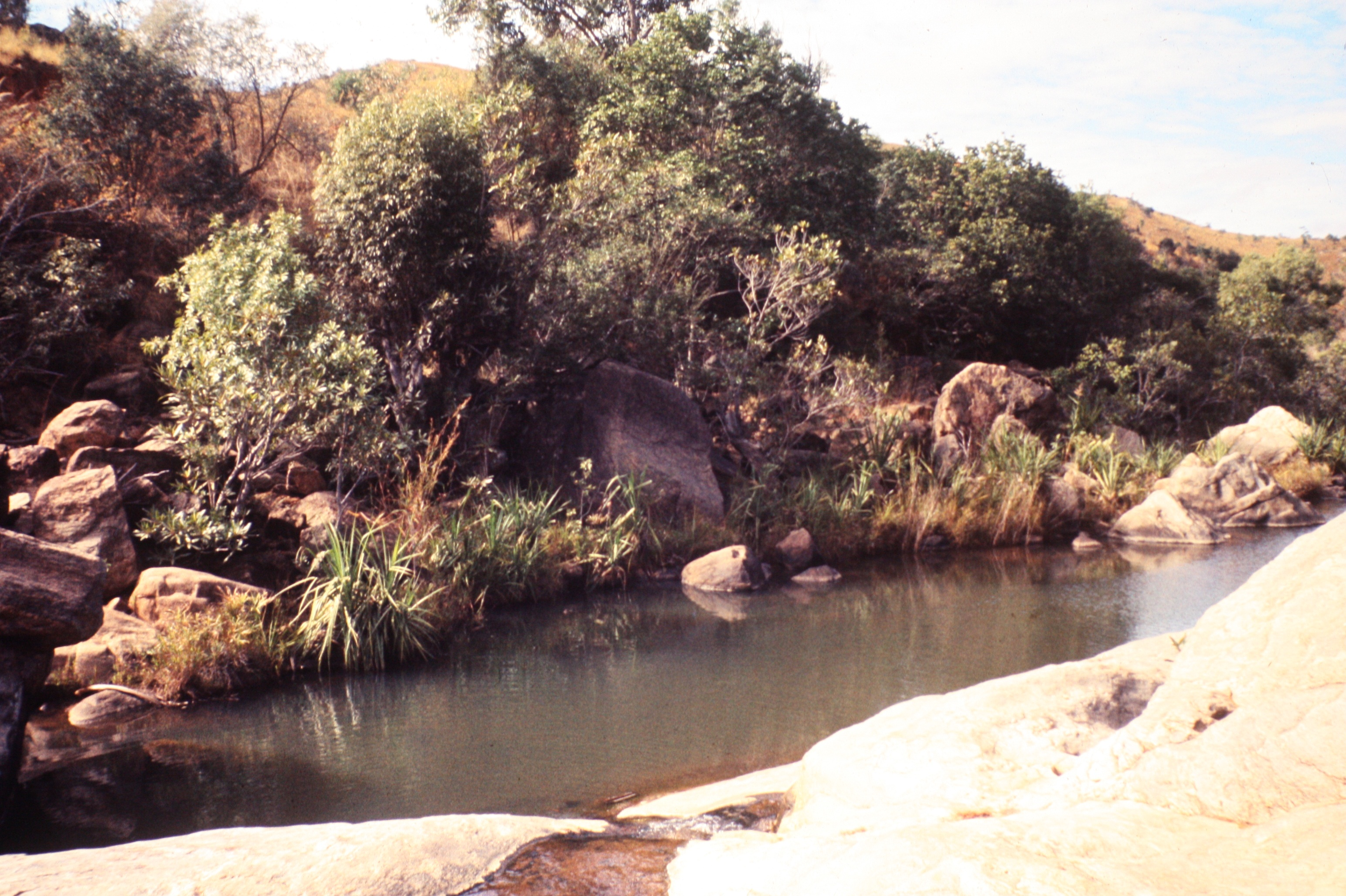
The Ihosy River in Madagascar

The Ihosy River is a river in Fianarantsoa Province in central Madagascar. It runs down from the hills of Bekisopa, through the town of Ihosy (at 22.4°S 46.1166667°E), which provides the name of the river.

Other passage points are Ambodiala and Ionadria. It empties in the Zomandao River

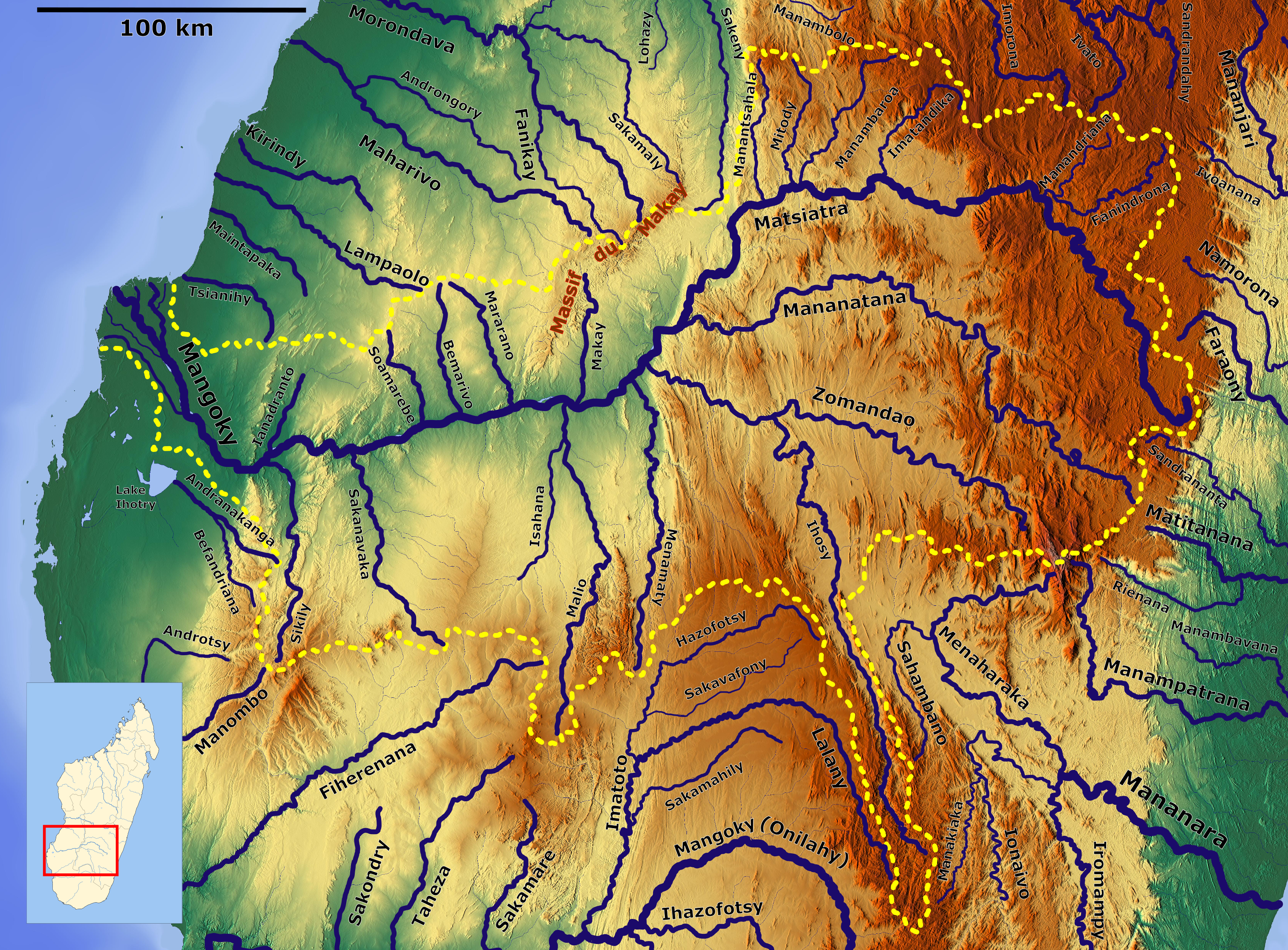
Mangoky Basssin
