= Farahalana =

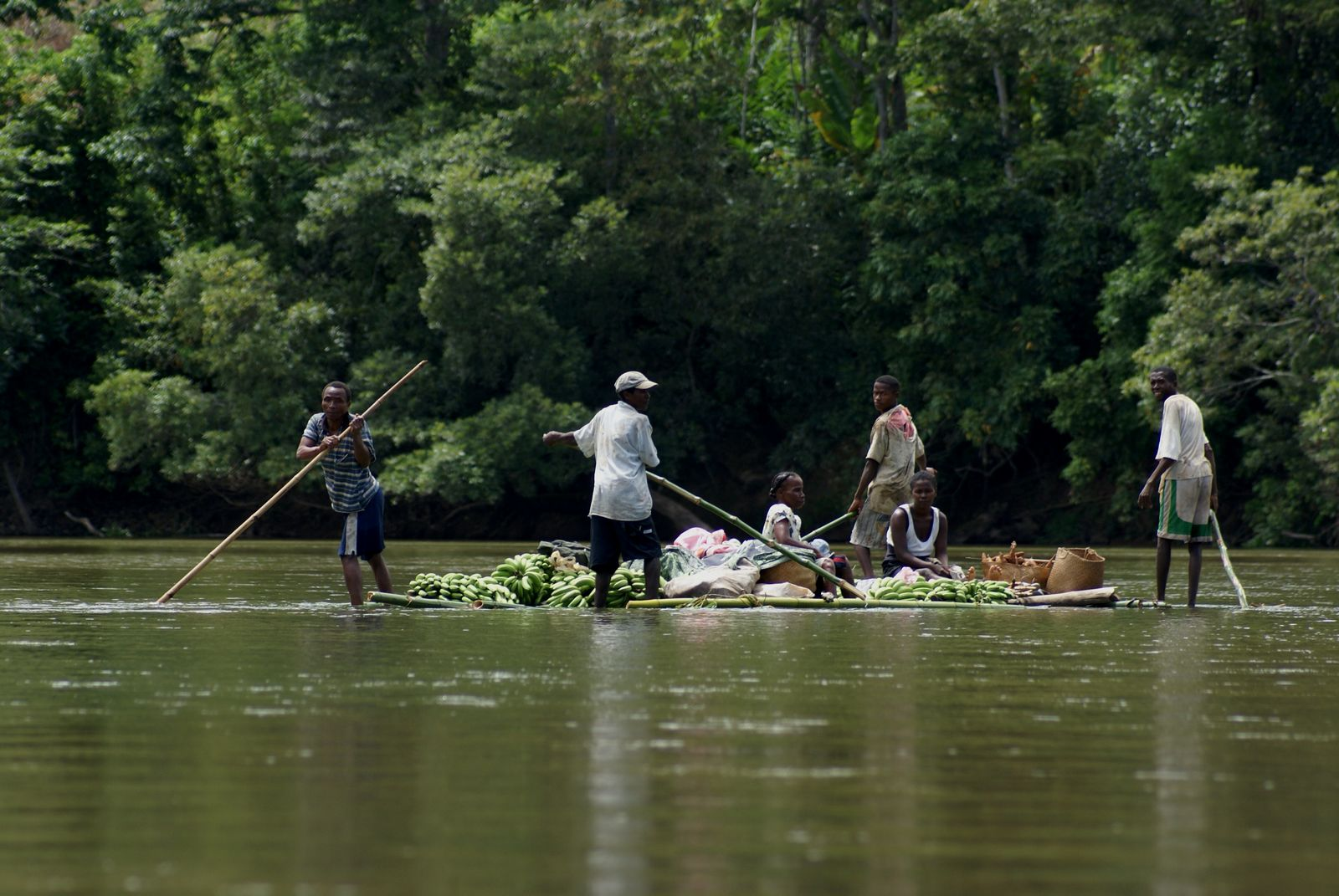
- the Lokoho river

- Location in Madagascar
- Coordinates: 14°26′S 50°10′E
- Country: Madagascar
- Region: Sava
- District: Sambava

Population (2001)
  - Total: 23,000
- Time zone: UTC3 (EAT)
- Postal code: 208

Farahalana is a municipality in northern Madagascar. It belongs to the district of Sambava, which is a part of Sava Region and lies near the mouth of the Lokoho River at the Indian Ocean. The population of the commune was estimated to be approximately 23,000 in 2001 commune census.

Primary and junior level secondary education are available in town. The majority 96% of the population the commune are farmers. The most important crop is vanilla, while other important products are coffee, cloves and rice. Services provide employment for 2% of the population. Additionally fishing employs 2% of the population.

== Geography ==
The municipality is situated south of Sambava on the National Road 5 on the Lokoho River.
