= Fanambana Bridge =

Bridge in Madagascar

Coordinates: 13.5454°S 49.9874°E

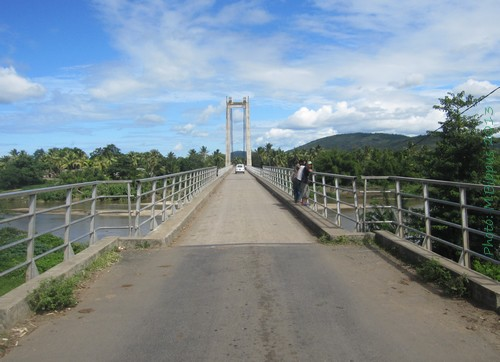
Fanambana Bridge

The Fanambana Bridge is situated at the Fanambana River on Route nationale 5a between Vohemar and Sambava in Sava, Madagascar. This bridge is a cable-stayed bridge with fan system, completed in 1964. The total length is 195 meters, including a main span of 120 meters.
