= Saharenana River =

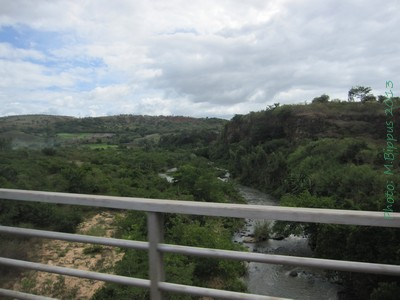
- Saharenana River near Antananandrenitelo

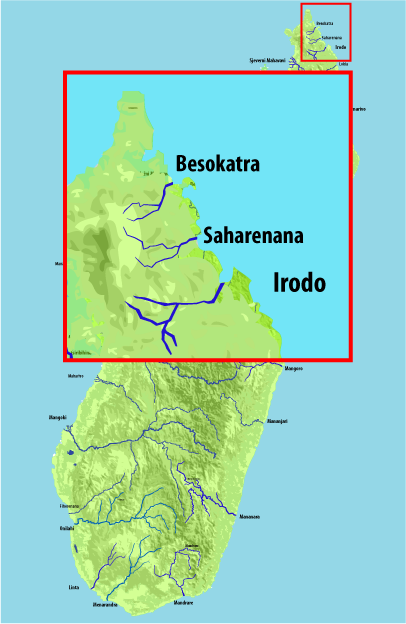
- Ambohitra Massif river system

Location
- Country: Madagascar
- Region: Diana

Physical characteristics
- Source
  - location: Ambohitra Massif, Diana
  - elevation: 1,445 m (4,741 ft)
- Mouth: Indian Ocean
  - location: Diana
  - coordinates: 12°39′40″S 49°33′20″E
  - elevation: 0 m (0 ft)
- Length: 52 km (32 mi)
- Basin size: 140 km^{2} (54 sq mi)
- Discharge
  - location: bridge of the RN6
  - average: 1.48 m^{3}/s (52 cu ft/s)
  - minimum: 0.86 m^{3}/s (30 cu ft/s)
  - maximum: 8.1 m^{3}/s (290 cu ft/s)

Basin features
- Tributaries
  - right: Andranotsimisiamalona River
- Bauduin & Servat, Etude d'Hydrologie à usage Agricole - ORSTOM pp.1-829 - page 16–17

The Saharenana River is located in northern Madagascar and crosses the Route Nationale 6 near Antananandrenitelo. Its sources are situated near Joffreville in the Ambohitra Massif and flows into the Indian Ocean.
