= Mandrare River =

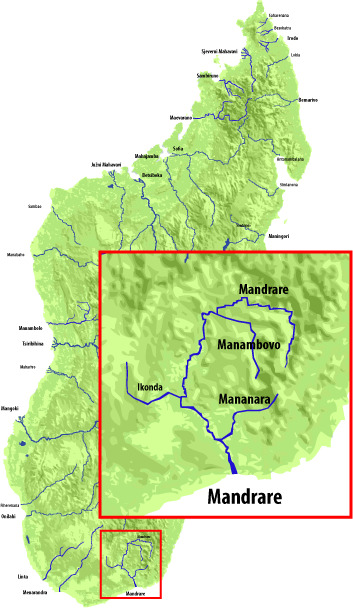

Location
- Country: Madagascar
- Region: Anosy
- Cities: Mahaly, Amboasary Sud, Berenty, Mahaly

Physical characteristics
- Source
  - location: Beampingaratra massif near Trafonaomby peak
  - elevation: 1,800 m (5,900 ft)
- Mouth: Indian Ocean
  - location: Anosy
  - coordinates: 25°10′26″S 46°26′00″E
  - elevation: 0 m (0 ft)
- Length: 270 km (170 mi)
- Basin size: 12,435 km^{2} (4,801 sq mi)

Basin features
- Progression: Amboasary Sud
- Tributaries
  - left: Manambovo River (above Mahaly), Mananara River (Anosy) (above Amboasary Sud)
  - right: Andratina River

Mandrare is a river in the region of Anosy in southern Madagascar. It flows into the Indian Ocean near Amboasary Sud. It becomes dry in certain months of the year.

In 1957, near Amboasary Sud a steel bridge of 414m was built, that was designed by Anciens Ets Eiffel.

== See also ==
- List of rivers of Madagascar
