= Andringitra Massif =

Mountain range in Madagascar

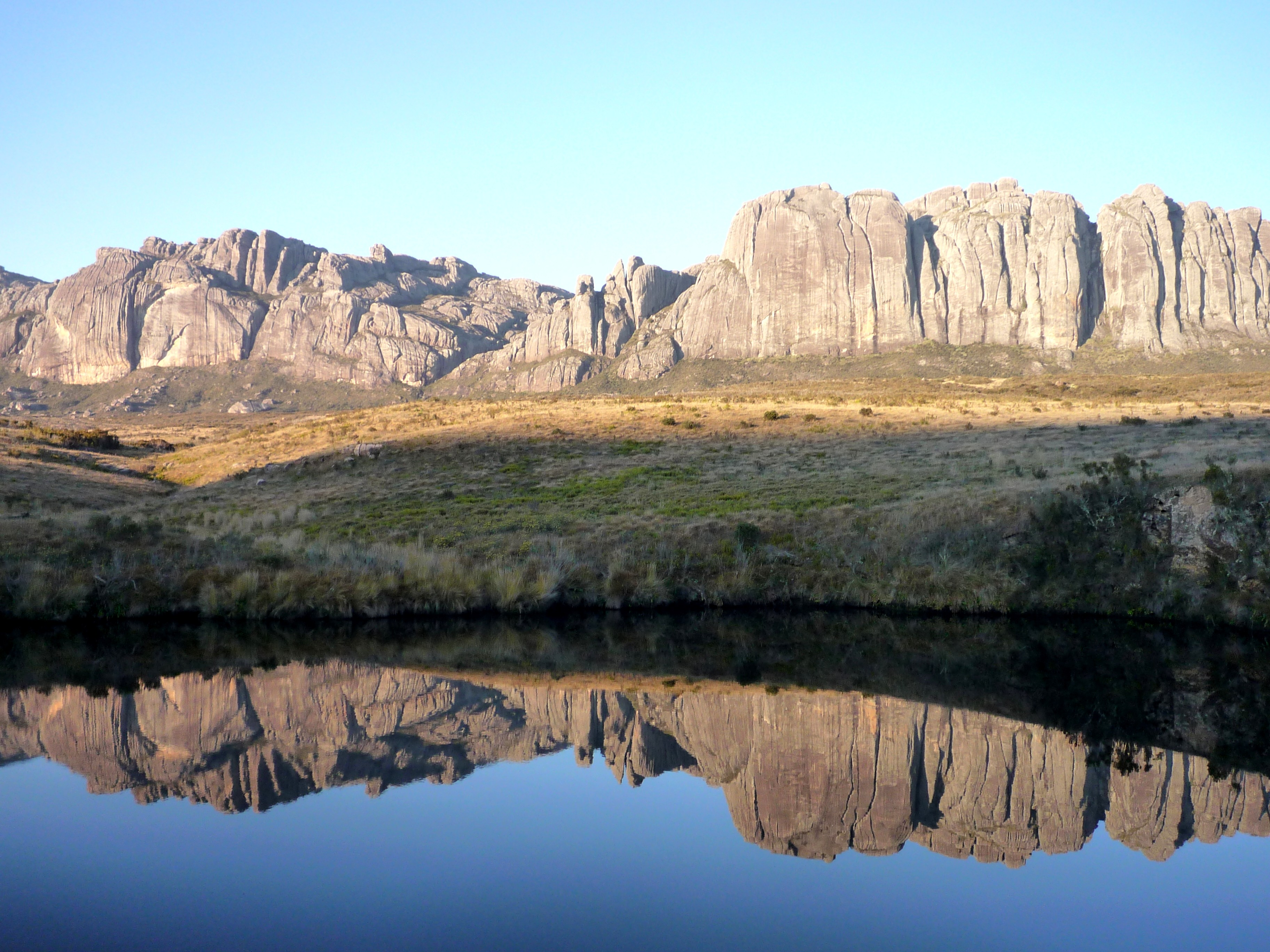
- A view of the massif.

Highest point
- Peak: Pic Boby
- Elevation: 2,658 m (8,720 ft)

Geography
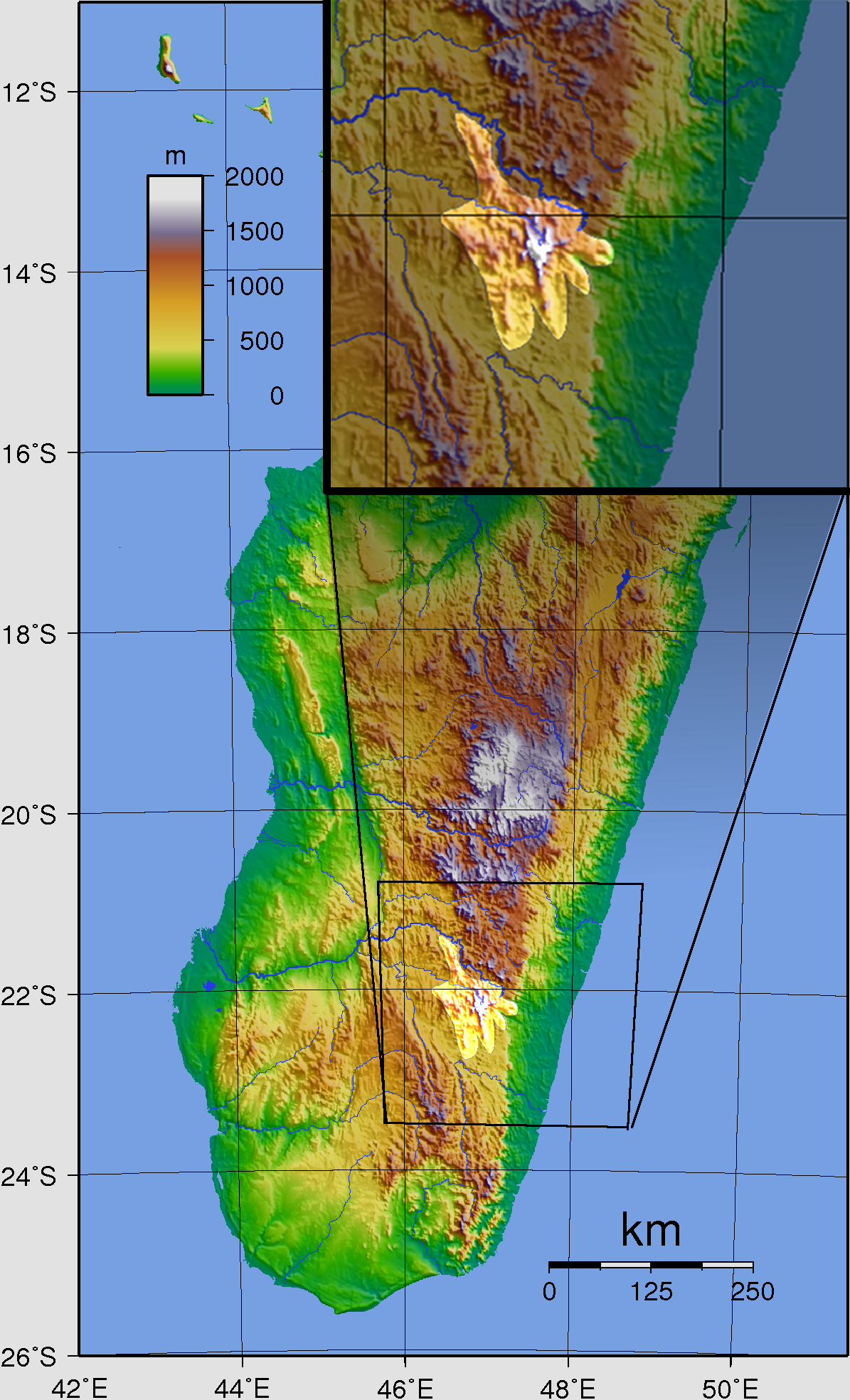
- Country: Madagascar
- Region: Fianarantsoa Province
- Range coordinates: 22°11.7′S 46°53.1′E

Geology
- Rock age: Precambrian
- Rock type(s): Igneous, metamorphic

The Andringitra Massif ("desert of rocks") is a granite massif located within Andringitra National Park in Madagascar. The range is approximately 64 kilometres (40 mi) long. In its central area, the range is almost 10 kilometres (6.2 mi) wide, though it is much narrower on either end. Pic Boby, the highest peak, stands at 2658 meters (8,720 ft) high.

The massif varies dramatically based on slope and altitude. The eastern slopes tend to be barren, with abrupt cliffs and channels scoured into the rock by erosion from tropical storms. The western slopes tend to slope more gradually, and are partly forested. The mountains' base is tropical, but the forest gives way to thick carpets of lichen. At approximately 2,000 metres (6,600 ft), there is a belt of hardy shrubs. Above this belt the mountains are a grassland.

Today, it is mainly occupied by herders and shepherds who move in a bid to find the freshest grazing grounds for their livestock. Tourists and adventurers have also visited the area as it provides both hiking and backpacking opportunities, as well as views of its geological formations.

== Geology ==
The massif is located in a relatively geologically-stable area, on solid Precambrian ground, which is evidence of the fact that these mountains were formed by a relatively sudden volcanic event. The mountains have many sharp cliffs and rises, as well as several volcanic formations. The Andringitra Massif contains many notable granite erosion sites, which have been formed over millions of years.
