= Route nationale 3a (Madagascar) =

Road in Madagascar

Location
- Country: Madagascar

Highway system
- Roads in Madagascar

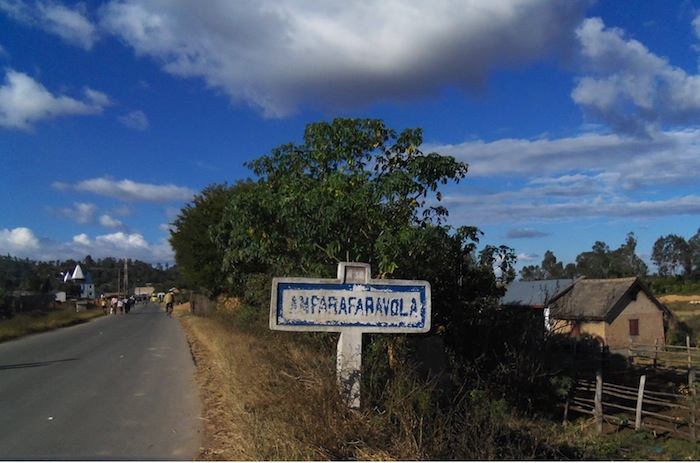
RN3a at Amparafaravola

Route nationale 3a (RN 3a) is a secondary highway of 180 km in Madagascar, running along the western banks of Lake Alaotra to Andilamena. It crosses the region of Alaotra-Mangoro.

== Selected locations on route ==
(north to south)

- Andilamena (continues as RN 32)
- Ankarefo
- Amboavory
- Tanambe
- Ambohijanahary
- Ambohitrarivo
- Amparafaravola
- intersection with RN 33 Bejofo and Morarano Gare
- Bejofo
- intersection with RN 44 near Andilanatoby

== See also ==
- List of roads in Madagascar
- Transport in Madagascar
