= Andilanatoby =

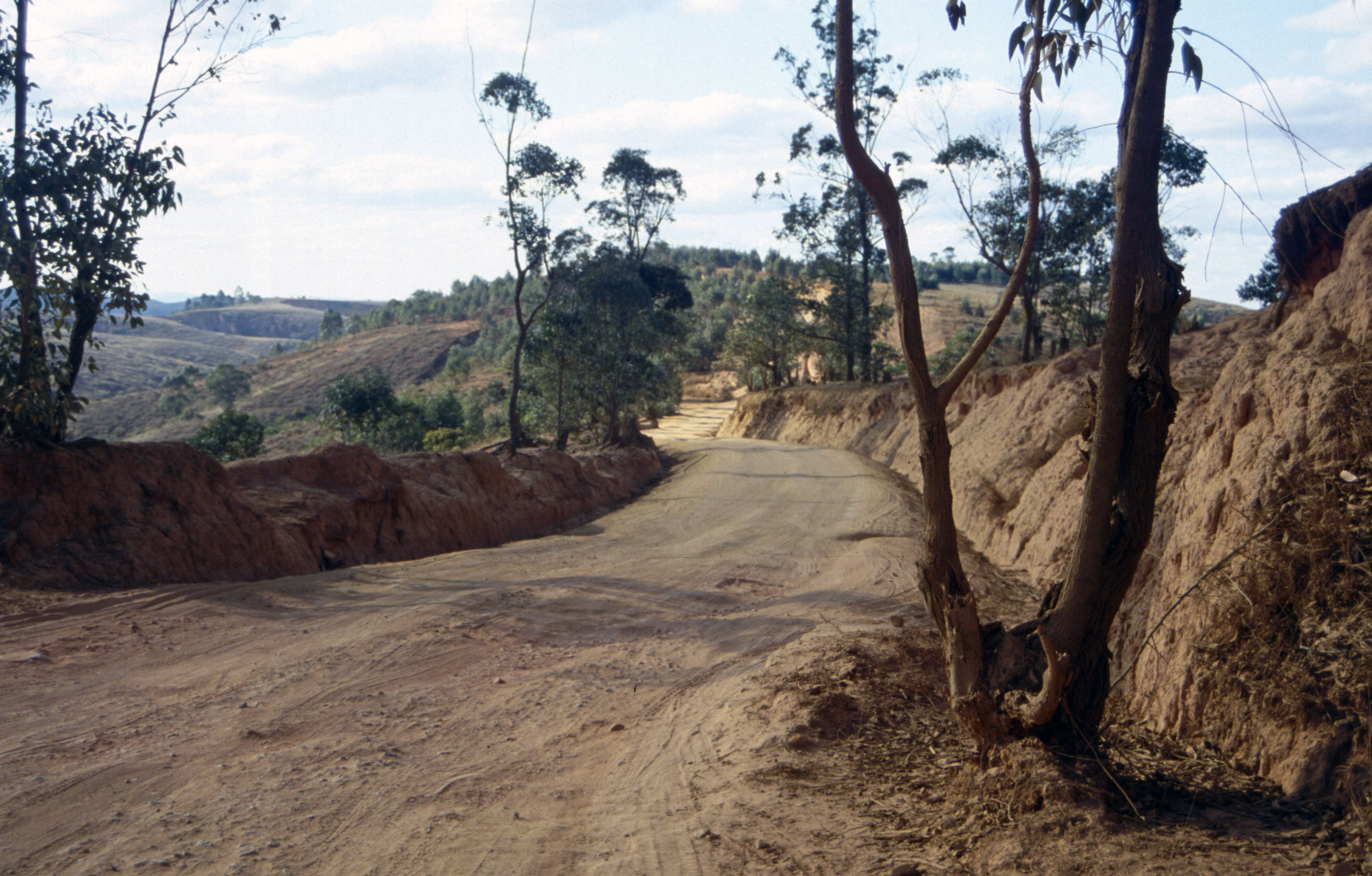
- National road 44, 3 km from Andilanatoby

- Location in Madagascar
- Coordinates: 17°56′S 48°14′E
- Country: Madagascar
- Region: Alaotra-Mangoro
- District: Ambatondrazaka
- Elevation: 802 m (2,631 ft)

Population (2001)
  - Total: 22,000
- Time zone: UTC3 (EAT)

Andilanatoby is a rural municipality in Madagascar. It is situated at 55 km south-east of Ambatondrazaka and also belongs to the district with the same name: Ambatondrazaka, which is a part of Alaotra-Mangoro Region. The population of the commune was estimated to be approximately 22,000 in 2001 commune census.

Primary and junior level secondary education are available in town. The majority 85% of the population of the commune are farmers, while an additional 10% receives their livelihood from raising livestock. The most important crop is rice, while other important products are beans and cassava. Services provide employment for 2% of the population. Additionally fishing employs 3% of the population.

== Roads ==
Andilanatoby is a railway station on the Moramanga - Alaotra Lake line. Also the Route nationale 44 passes this municipality.

== Rivers ==
The Ranofotsy, which is an affluent of the Maningory River.
