= Amparafaravola District =

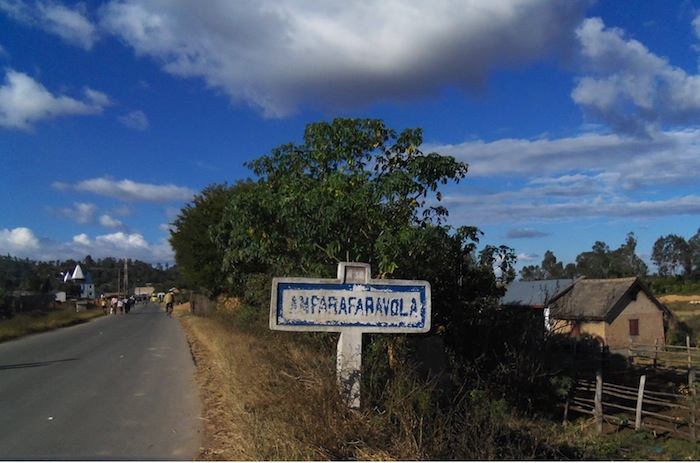
- Amparafaravola

- Location in Madagascar
- Coordinates: 17.5833°S 48.2167°E
- Country: Madagascar
- Region: Alaotra-Mangoro
- District: Amparafaravola

Area
  - Total: 4,623 km^{2} (1,785 sq mi)

Population (2020)
  - Total: 338,494
  - Density: 73.22/km^{2} (189.6/sq mi)
- Climate: Cwa

Anparafaravola District is a district in the Alaotra-Mangoro region in Madagascar. Its capital is Amparafaravola. The district has an area of 4,623 km^{2} (1,785 sq mi), and the estimated population in 2020 was 338,494.

The district hosts the western part of Alaotra lake protected harmonious landscape.

== Communes ==
The district is further divided into 21 communes:

- Ambatomainty
- Amboavory
- Ambodimanga
- Ambohijanahary
- Ambohimandroso
- Ambohitrarivo
- Ampasikely
- Amparafaravola
- Andilana Nord
- Andrebakely Nord
- Andrebakely Sud
- Andromba
- Anororo
- Beanana
- Bedidy
- Morarano Chrome
- Ranomainty
- Sahamamy
- Tanambe
- Vohimena
- Vohitsara

== Protected area ==
- Part of Alaotra lake protected harmonious landscape
