= Andrebakely Nord =

- Location in Madagascar
- Coordinates: 17°23′S 48°38′E
- Country: Madagascar
- Region: Alaotra-Mangoro
- District: Ambatondrazaka
- Elevation: 764 m (2,507 ft)

Population (2018)
  - Total: 17,078
- Time zone: UTC3 (EAT)

Andrebakely Nord is a town and commune (Malagasy: kaominina) in Madagascar. It belongs to the district of Ambatondrazaka, which is a part of Alaotra-Mangoro Region. The population of the commune is 17,078 inhabitants by 2018.

Andrebakely Nord lies on the RN 44, between Imerimandroso (south) and Amboavory (north).
