= Manakambahiny Ouest =

Manakambahiny Ouest Manakambahiny Andrefana
- Location in Madagascar
- Coordinates: 17°48′S 48°20′E
- Country: Madagascar
- Region: Alaotra-Mangoro
- District: Ambatondrazaka

Government
  - Mayor: Mamy Hary Tiana Ramanamahefa

Area
  - Total: 380 km^{2} (150 sq mi)
- Elevation: 791 m (2,595 ft)

Population (2001)
  - Total: 22,000
- Time zone: UTC3 (EAT)
- Postal code: 503

Manakambahiny Ouest or Manakambahiny Andrefana is a rural municipality in Madagascar. It belongs to the district of Ambatondrazaka, which is a part of Alaotra-Mangoro Region. The population of the commune was estimated to be approximately 22,000 in 2001 commune census.

Primary and junior level secondary education are available in town. Als the state university of Aloatra-Mangoro, the Université de Manakambahiny is situated in this town. The majority 90% of the population of the commune are farmers, while an additional 7% receives their livelihood from raising livestock. The most important crop is rice, while other important products are manioc and maize. Industry and services provide both employment for 1% of the population. Additionally fishing employs 1% of the population.

== Infrastructures ==
The National road 44 (Moramanga - Ambatondrazaka). Manakambahiny Andrefana also has a railway station on the Moramanga - Alaotra Lake line.

== Geography ==
Manakambahiny Andrefana is situated at 18 km south of Ambatondrazaka on the National road 44.14 fokontany (villages) are part of this municipality.
