= Ambodirano =

Village in Madagascar

Ambodirano Ambodirano Andaingo
- Location in Madagascar
- Coordinates: 18°11′50″S 48°15′13″E
- Country: Madagascar
- Region: Alaotra-Mangoro
- District: Moramanga
- Time zone: UTC3 (EAT)
- Postal code: 514

Ambodirano (also known as Ambodirano-Andaingo) is a small village in Madagascar. With a population of 1,300 the village's main source of income comes from traditional farming. The national road Route nationale 44 serves as the main artery that links the village of Ambodirano to the cities of Moramanga (in the south) and Ambatondrazaka (in the north). One of the major problems that the population of Ambodirano faces is the lack of clean drinking water; villagers have no access to safe water. Adding to that, the majority of the population has no access to any form of sanitation facilities; this situation causes diseases such as diarrhea and tuberculosis.

== Municipality ==
Ambodirano is part of the municipality of Andaingo.
