= Sahamamy =

- Location in Madagascar
- Coordinates: 17°31′S 48°18′E
- Country: Madagascar
- Region: Alaotra-Mangoro
- District: Amparafaravola

Population
  - Total: 4,000
- Time zone: UTC3 (EAT)
- Postal code: 504

Sahamamy is a rural municipality in Madagascar. It belongs to the district of Amparafaravola, which is a part of Alaotra-Mangoro Region. The population of the commune is not known, but in 2013 elections there had been 3942 authorized voters.

== Geography ==
This municipality is situated at 15 km North of Amparafaravola. 4 fokontany (villages) belong to this municipality.

== Infrastructures ==
The National Road 3a crosses this municipality.
