= Rail transport in Madagascar =

1000 mm railways in Madagascar

Rail transport in Madagascar is primarily operated by Madarail. There are two unconnected systems having a total length of 855 km (531 mi), as of 2023, all metre gauge, 1,000 mm (39 3/8 in). The northern railway is concessioned to Madarail. Since April 2022 Madarail has been 100% owned by the Madagascan state. The southern line, Fianarantsoa-Côte-Est railway is a parastatal (state owned) line.

The historical length of lines in the country was 899 km (559 mi) together with a number of military and industrial lines of at least 108 km (67 mi).

== History ==
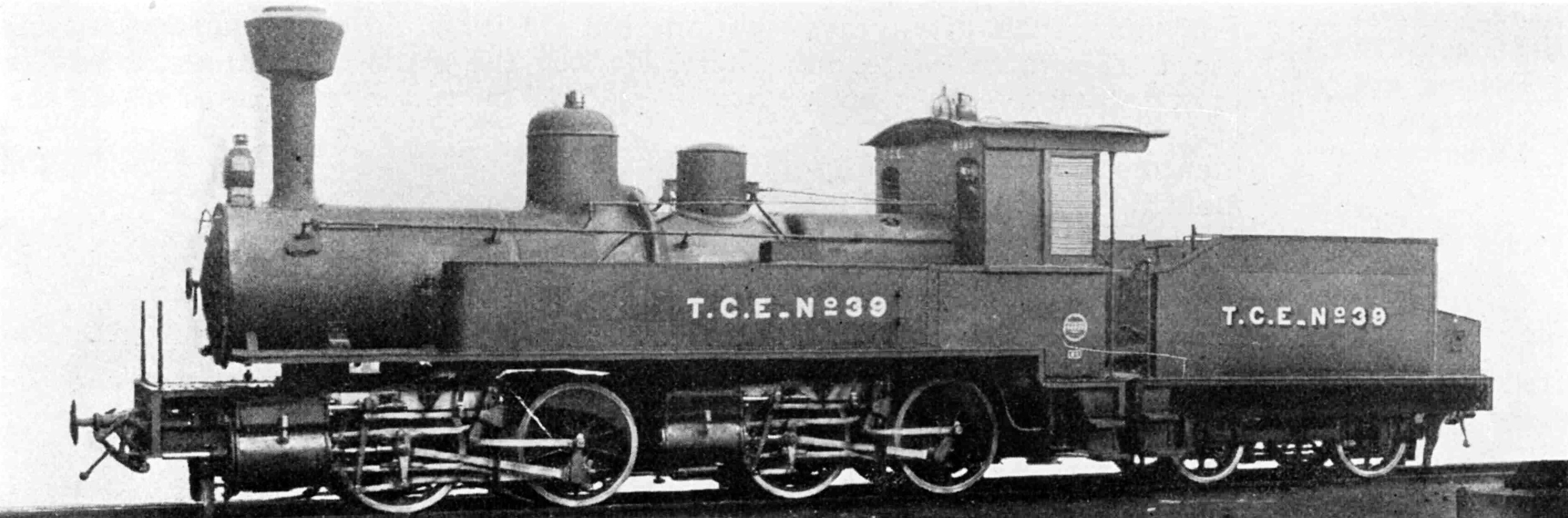
C. de F. de Madagascar 0-4-4-0 Mallet locomotive, built by Baldwin Locomotive Works.

The history of rail transport in Madagascar began at the end on the nineteenth century, with the construction of industrial and military Decauville lines in the north of the country, centred on the port of Diego-Suarez (now Antsiranana).

These were closely followed by the construction a metre gauge line between Brickaville (now Ampasimanolotra) and Madagascar's capital, Tananarive (now Antananarivo) in 1909. This line was extended to Toamasina, the country's chief seaport in 1913. The line is known as the Tananarive–Côte Est railway (TCE). It subsequently became the nucleus of a network of three railways, the Network North (French: Réseau Nord).

Between 1926 and 1936, an isolated line, the Fianarantsoa-Côte Est railway (FCE), was built, again in metre gauge, in the south east of the island. The FCE is known as Southern Network (French: Réseau Sud).

Construction on the Madagascar Railway (Le Chemin-de-Fer de Madagascar) started in 1901 at Anivorano on the line from Tananarive to Toamasina / Tamatave. The northern network was essentially complete by 1923 and the southern line by 1936.

=== Management ===
The two separate networks were combined under the same management in 1944.

On 1 January 1951 Régie des chemins de fer de Madagascar (RCFM) came into operation.

The whole system was nationalized in 1974.

It became a state corporation on 6 May 1982 as Réseau National des Chemins de Fer Malagasy (RNCFM).

By the 1990s, the national system was very run down and the Malagasy government decided to privatize it. In 2003 Network North was concessioned to a joint stock company, Madarail, under a 25-year concession, while the Southern network remained under parastatal operation. In 2022 the private investors desisted and the company is now 100% owned by the state of Madagascar.

=== Existing lines ===
- Antananarivo-Toamasina via Moramanga (TCE): 376 km, completed 1913
- Vohidiala-Morarano Chrome (VMC): 19 km, completed 1969
- Moramanga-Ambatondrazaka (MLA): 142 km, completed 1923
- Antananarivo-Antsirabe (TA): 153 km, completed 1923
- Fianarantsoa-Manakara (FCE) - 163 km, completed 1936

All of the above are of 1,000mm gauge.

Service on the line from Antananarivo to Antsirabe ceased the mid-1990's after the passage of the Cyclone Ana damaged a bridge over the river Sasaony. The line between Antananarivo and Antsirabe re-opened on 2 December 2023.

There had been also a project to connect the port of Mahajanga with the port of Toamasina, via Lac Alaotra. This was never realized. In January 2026 a new rail line service was launched, connecting Soarano station in the city centre with Ambohimanambola.

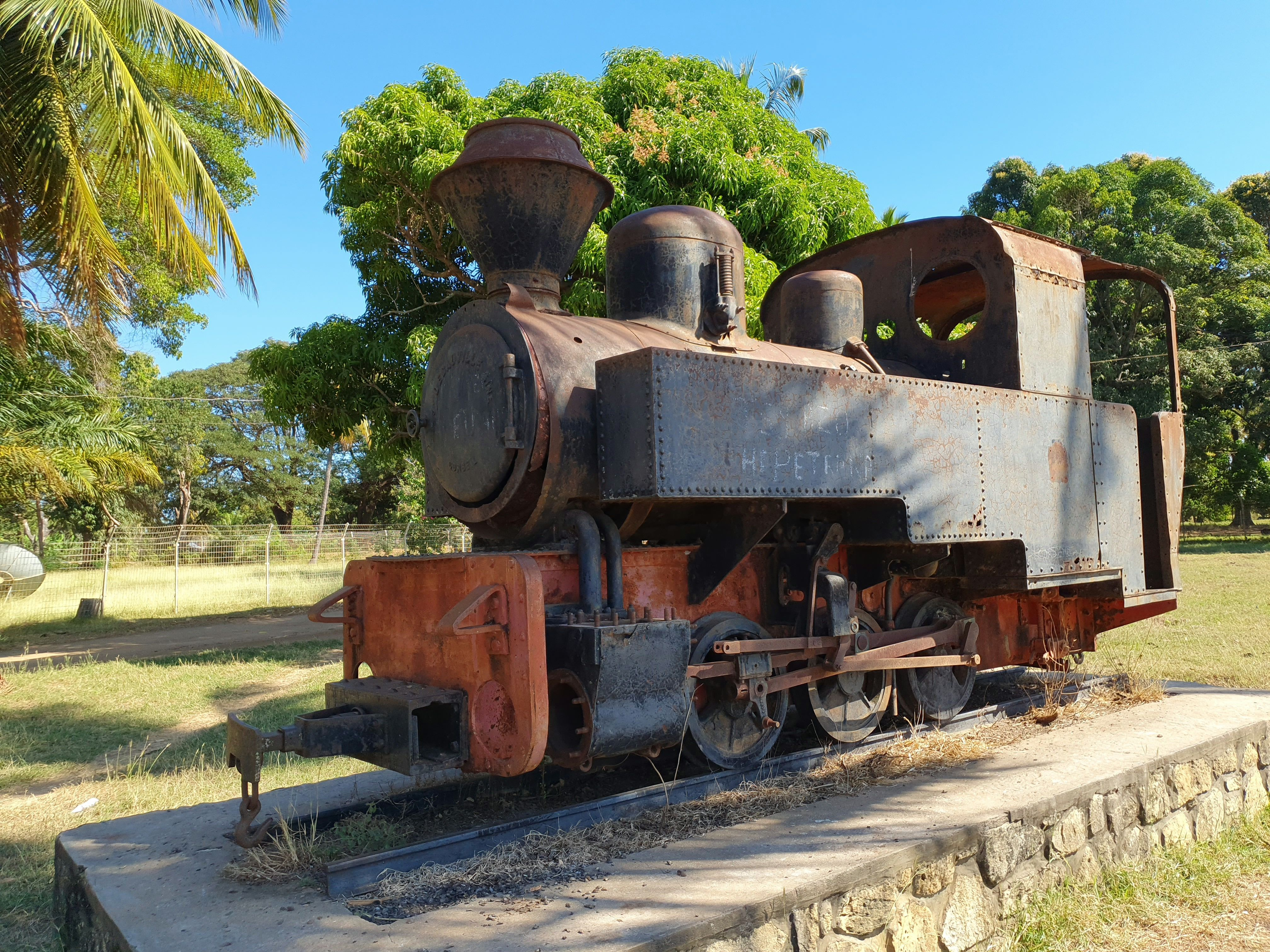
Decauville locomotive at Namakia

=== Former Lines ===
- Antananarivo-Alarobia: 4km, a tramway in the capital city, 2.5 km of which is incorporated in to the TCE line.
- Antsirabe-Vinaninkarena: 13 km, an extension of the TA line completed in 1986.
- Ambatondrazaka-Ambatosoratra: 25km, a closed section of the MLA line.

All of the above were of 1,000mm gauge.

In addition there were a number of industrial and military lines including:

- Sucreries de Nosy-Bé et de la Côte Est (SNBCE), around 13km of 914mm gauge.
- Sucrerie de Brickaville (now Vohibinany), around 10km of 600mm gauge.
- Sucrerie de Namakia, around 10 km of 600mm gauge to Mahajanga from the sugar factory in Namakia.
- Sucrerie de la Mahavavy, Ambilobe, around 10km line of 600mm gauge to a river wharf at Port Saint-Louis.
- Antsiranana (Diego-Suarez)-Mahatsinjarivo Fort, around 13km of 600mm gauge Decauville line.
- Anamaki-Antongombato, around 8km of 600mm gauge Decauville line operated by Graineterie Française.
- Antsiranana-Camp de Sakamary, around 25km of 600mm gauge Decauville line, the Diego Suarez railway.
- Morondova-Four à Chaux, around 11km operated by Gites Minéraux de Madagascar (GMM).

== Operations ==
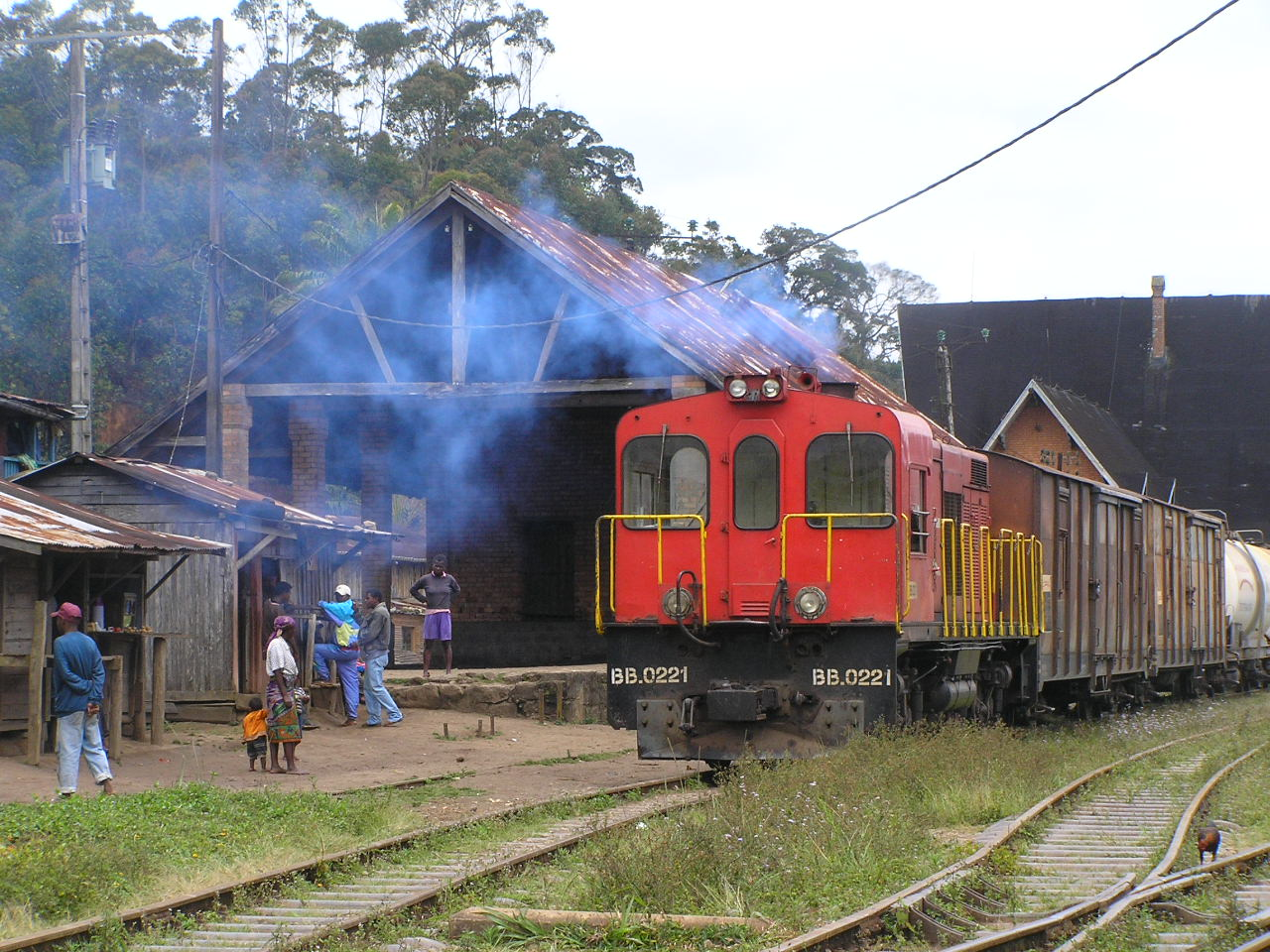
A freight train in Andasibe, Moramanga

There is a regular (at least daily) goods traffic between the port city of Toamasina and the capital city of Antananarivo. There are daily passenger trains on the Madarail system. Very occasionally, there are special chartered trips on restored Micheline railcars for tourists. The southern line has a regular daily passenger train, which provides a slow but picturesque alternative to the recently rehabilitated road in the region.

The line between Antananarivo and Antsirabe re-opened on 2 December 2023.

== Urban Passenger Service ==
A passenger service between Soarano (Antananarivo main station) and Amaronakona (18°55'49.9"S 47°34'44.8"E, on the TCE line) was due to commence in August 2023. Eight stations were planned. Similarly diesel powered trains will initially operate instead of the planned electric trains.

Initial operation was subsequently delayed until 'early 2024' in an announcement on 7 December 2023.

A limited service of two pairs of trains per day commenced in December 2025, operating 16km between Antananarivo and Ambohimanambola.

== Interfaces ==
- Continuous Brakes: Air/Vacuum/Unbraked ?
- Couplers: Centre buffer and two side hooks and chains.

== Cities served by rail ==
- Antananarivo - national capital
- Toamasina - chief seaport

== See also ==
- Economy of Madagascar
- History of Madagascar
- Madarail
- Transport in Madagascar
