= Amboasary Gara =

- Location in Madagascar
- Coordinates: 18°26′S 48°16′E
- Country: Madagascar
- Region: Alaotra-Mangoro
- District: Moramanga
- Elevation: 907 m (2,976 ft)

Population (2018)
  - Total: 13,601
- Time zone: UTC3 (EAT)
- Postal code: 514

Amboasary (also Amboasary Gara) is a rural commune in Madagascar. It belongs to the district of Moramanga, which is a part of Alaotra-Mangoro Region. The population of the commune was 13,601 in 2018.

Primary and junior level secondary education are available in town. The majority 60% of the population of the commune are farmers. The most important crop is rice, while other important products are cassava and taro. Industry and services provide employment for 8% and 22% of the population, respectively. Additionally fishing employs 10% of the population. Amboasary Gara is a railway station on the Moramanga - Alaotra Lake line.

== See also ==
- Sahamaitso (river)

== Transport ==
The town is situated at the RN44 and the railway line Moramanga – Ambatondrazaka (TCE).
