= Bedidy =

- Location in Madagascar
- Coordinates: 17°28′S 48°1′E
- Country: Madagascar
- Region: Alaotra-Mangoro
- District: Amparafaravola
- Elevation: 917 m (3,009 ft)

Population (2001)
  - Total: 10,000
- Time zone: UTC3 (EAT)
- Postal code: 504

Bedidy is a rural municipality in Madagascar. It belongs to the district of Amparafaravola, which is a part of Alaotra-Mangoro Region. The population of the commune was estimated to be approximately 10,000 in 2001 commune census.

Only primary schooling is available. The majority 99% of the population of the commune are farmers. The most important crop is rice, while other important products are maize and cassava. Services provide employment for 1% of the population.

== Geography ==
Bedidy is situated 46 km West of Amparafaravola to which it is linked by a unpaved piste.
