= Morarano Gare =

Morarano Gare Morarano Gara
- Location in Madagascar
- Country: Madagascar
- Region: Alaotra-Mangoro
- District: Moramanga

Government
  - Mayor: Lala Razanaparany

Area
  - Total: 921.35 km^{2} (355.74 sq mi)

Population (2018)
  - Total: 17,545
- Bezanozano (80%)
- Time zone: UTC3 (EAT)
- Postal code: 514

Morarano Gare is a rural municipality in Madagascar. It belongs to the district of Moramanga, which is a part of Alaotra-Mangoro Region. The population of the commune was 17,545 in 2018.

7 fokontany (villages) belong to the municipality that are: Marovoay, Morarano Gare, Ambohidray, Marofody, Androfia, Ambohibolakely and Sakalava.

In the west flows the Mangoro River over 25 km at the limits of the municipality.

Primary and junior level secondary education are available in town. The majority 98% of the population of the commune are farmers. The most important crop is rice, while other important products are cassava and sweet potatoes. Industry and services provide both employment for 1% of the population.

== Transport ==
The town is situated at 30 km from Moramanga on the RN44 and the railway line Moramanga – Ambatondrazaka (MLA: Moramanga-Lac-Alaotra).

== Mining ==
The Ambatovy mine, a large nickel and cobalt mine, is partly located in this municipality.
