= Ampasikely =

- Location within Madagascar
- Country: Madagascar
- Region: Alaotra-Mangoro
- District: Ambatondrazaka
- Elevation: 782 m (2,566 ft)

Population (2012)
  - Total: 6,995
- Time zone: UTC3 (EAT)

Ampasikely is a town and commune (Malagasy: kaominina) in Madagascar. It belongs to the district of Ambatondrazaka, which is a part of Alaotra-Mangoro Region. The population of the commune was estimated to be approximately 6,995 in 2012.

It had become a village (Fokontany) in 1975. It borders in the north to Ambohimandroso, in the south to Ambodifarihy, in the east to Ambatomainty and Mahakary and in the west to Ampandriatsara and Amparihimaina.

== Economy ==
It is based on agriculture. 70% of its inhabitants plant rice.

== Ethnicities ==
- Merina - 60%
- Betsimisaraka - 20%
- Sihanaka - 15%
- Antandroy - 5%

== Religion ==
85% are Christians, there are 4 churches in the town. 15% belong to traditional religion.
