= Andrebakely Est =

Coordinates: 17.6872°S 48.1935°E

- Interactive map of Andrebakely Est
- Country: Madagascar
- Region: Alaotra-Mangoro
- District: Amparafaravola

Population (2001)
  - Total: 12,000
- Time zone: UTC3 (EAT)

Andrebakely Est is a town and commune (Malagasy: kaominina) in Madagascar. It belongs to the district of Amparafaravola, which is a part of Alaotra-Mangoro Region. The population of the commune was estimated to be approximately 12,000 in 2001 commune census.

Primary and junior level secondary education are available in town. The majority 80% of the population of the commune are farmers. The most important crop is rice, while other important products are bananas and sugarcane. Services provide employment for 5% of the population. Additionally fishing employs 15% of the population.
