= Beanana =

- Location in Madagascar
- Coordinates: 17°22′S 48°26′E
- Country: Madagascar
- Region: Alaotra-Mangoro
- District: Amparafaravola
- Elevation: 769 m (2,523 ft)

Population (2001)
  - Total: 10,000
- Time zone: UTC3 (EAT)

Beanana is a town and commune (Malagasy: kaominina) in Madagascar. It belongs to the district of Amparafaravola, which is a part of Alaotra-Mangoro Region. The population of the commune was estimated to be approximately 10,000 in 2001 commune census.

Primary and junior level secondary education are available in town. The majority 80% of the population of the commune are farmers, while an additional 15% receives their livelihood from raising livestock. The most important crop is rice, while other important products are cassava and sweet potatoes. Services provide employment for 5% of the population.
