= Ambodimanga =

Ambodimanga may refer to several communes in Madagascar:

- Ambodimanga in Ambanja District, Diana Region
- Ambodimanga in Andapa District, Sava Region
- Ambodimanga II in Fenerive Est District, Analanjirofo Region
- Ambodimanga, Amparafaravola, a municipality in Alaotra-Mangoro
- Ambodimanga, Zafindrafady, a municipality in Fitovinany
- Ambodimanga Rantabe, a municipality in Analanjirofo, Maroantsetra (district)
- Ambodimanga, Maevatanana a village in Betsiboka
