= Vohidiala =

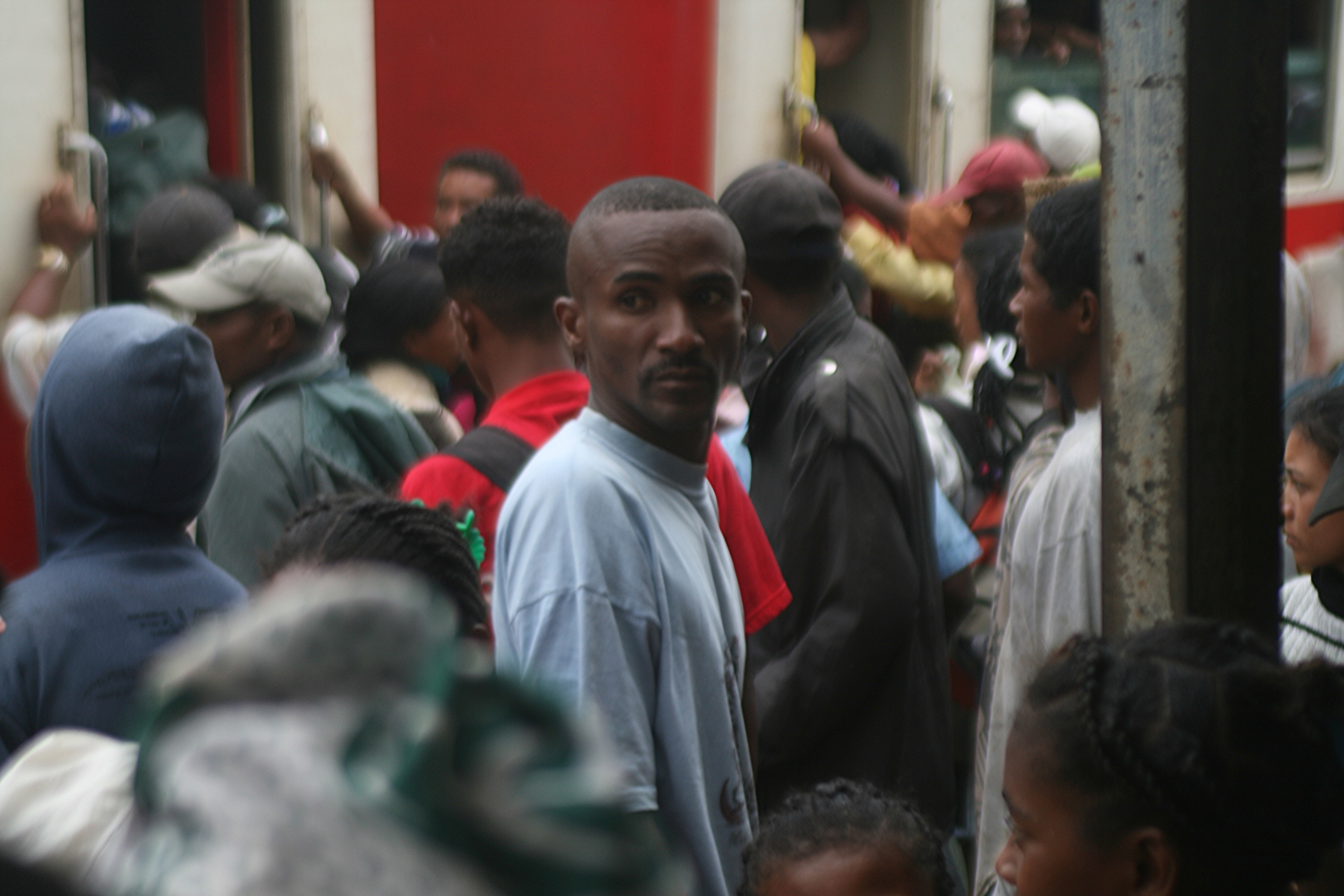
- The population of Vohidiala

- Location in Madagascar
- Coordinates: 17°54′S 48°15′E
- Country: Madagascar
- Region: Alaotra-Mangoro
- District: Ambatondrazaka
- Time zone: UTC3 (EAT)
- Postal code: 503

Vohidiala is a rural municipality in Madagascar. It belongs to the district of Ambatondrazaka, which is a part of Alaotra-Mangoro Region.

== Transport ==
Vohidiala is a railway station on the Moramanga - Alaotra Lake line and is located at the RN 44 with its junction with RN 3A.

== Religion ==
- FJKM - Fiangonan'i Jesoa Kristy eto Madagasikara (Church of Jesus Christ in Madagascar)
