= Félix Ramboahangison =

Malagasy politician

Félix Ramboahangison is a Malagasy politician and was a member of the National Assembly of Madagascar. He had been named as a suppleant of Jean Louis Robinson who left the post as a deputy as he was named Minister of Health in 2007. He is in the Tiako I Madagasikara party; he represents the constituency of Amparafaravola.
