= Ambohimandroso =

Ambohimandroso may refer to the following places in Madagascar:

- Ambohimandroso, Ambalavao, a town and commune in Haute Matsiatra
- Ambohimandroso, Ambatondrazaka, a town and commune in Alaotra-Mangoro
- Ambohimandroso, Antanifotsy, a town and commune in Vakinankaratra
- Ambohimandroso, Farafangana, a town and commune in Atsimo-Atsinanana
