= Elie Odon Fidèle Rasoanaivo =

Malagasy politician

Elie Odon Fidèle Rasoanaivo is a Malagasy politician. A member of the National Assembly of Madagascar, he was elected as a member of the Tiako I Madagasikara party; he represents the constituency of Ambatondrazaka.
