= Vohitsara =

- Location in Madagascar
- Coordinates: 17°24′S 48°30′E
- Country: Madagascar
- Region: Alaotra-Mangoro
- District: Amparafaravola
- Elevation: 756 m (2,480 ft)

Population (2001)
  - Total: 5,000
- Time zone: UTC3 (EAT)

Vohitsara is a town and commune (Malagasy: kaominina) in Madagascar. It belongs to the district of Amparafaravola, which is a part of the Alaotra-Mangoro Region. The population of the commune was estimated to be approximately 5,000 in the 2001 commune census.

Primary and junior level secondary education are available in town. Farmers comprise 78% of the commune's population. The most important crop is rice, while other important products are vegetables and beans. Industry and services both provide employment for 1% of the population. Fishing employs 20% of the population.
