= Eilema griveaudi =

Scientific classification
- Kingdom: Animalia
- Phylum: Arthropoda
- Class: Insecta
- Order: Lepidoptera
- Superfamily: Noctuoidea
- Family: Erebidae
- Subfamily: Arctiinae
- Genus: Eilema
- Species: E. griveaudi

Binomial name
- Eilema griveaudi Toulgoët, 1960

Species of moth

Eilema griveaudi is a moth of the subfamily Arctiinae. It was described by Hervé de Toulgoët in 1960. It is found in eastern Madagascar.

This species has a wingspan of 33 mm. The forewings are red orange with a large blue-black-metallic spot. The holotype was provided from Moramanga.
