= Ranomainty =

- Location in Madagascar
- Coordinates: 17°52′S 48°7′E
- Country: Madagascar
- Region: Alaotra-Mangoro
- District: Amparafaravola
- Elevation: 824 m (2,703 ft)

Population (2001)
  - Total: 8,000
- Time zone: UTC3 (EAT)

Ranomainty is a town and commune (Malagasy: kaominina) in Madagascar. It belongs to the district of Amparafaravola, which is a part of Alaotra-Mangoro Region. The population of the commune was estimated to be approximately 8,000 in 2001 commune census.

Only primary schooling is available. The majority 99% of the population of the commune are farmers. The most important crop is rice, while other important products are beans and sweet potatoes. Services provide employment for 1% of the population.
