= Ambatomainty, Amparafaravola =

Ambatomainty
- Location in Madagascar
- Coordinates: 17°41′S 48°13′E
- Country: Madagascar
- Region: Alaotra-Mangoro
- District: Amparafaravola
- Elevation: 767 m (2,516 ft)

Population (2001)
  - Total: 39,000
- Time zone: UTC3 (EAT)

Ambatomainty is a town and commune (Malagasy: kaominina) in Madagascar. It belongs to the district of Amparafaravola, which is a part of Alaotra-Mangoro Region. The population of the commune was estimated to be approximately 39,000 in 2001 commune census.

Ambatomainty is served by a local airport. Primary and junior level secondary education are available in town. The majority 94% of the population of the commune are farmers. The most important crop is rice, while other important products are maize and cassava. Services provide employment for 1% of the population. Additionally fishing employs 5% of the population.
