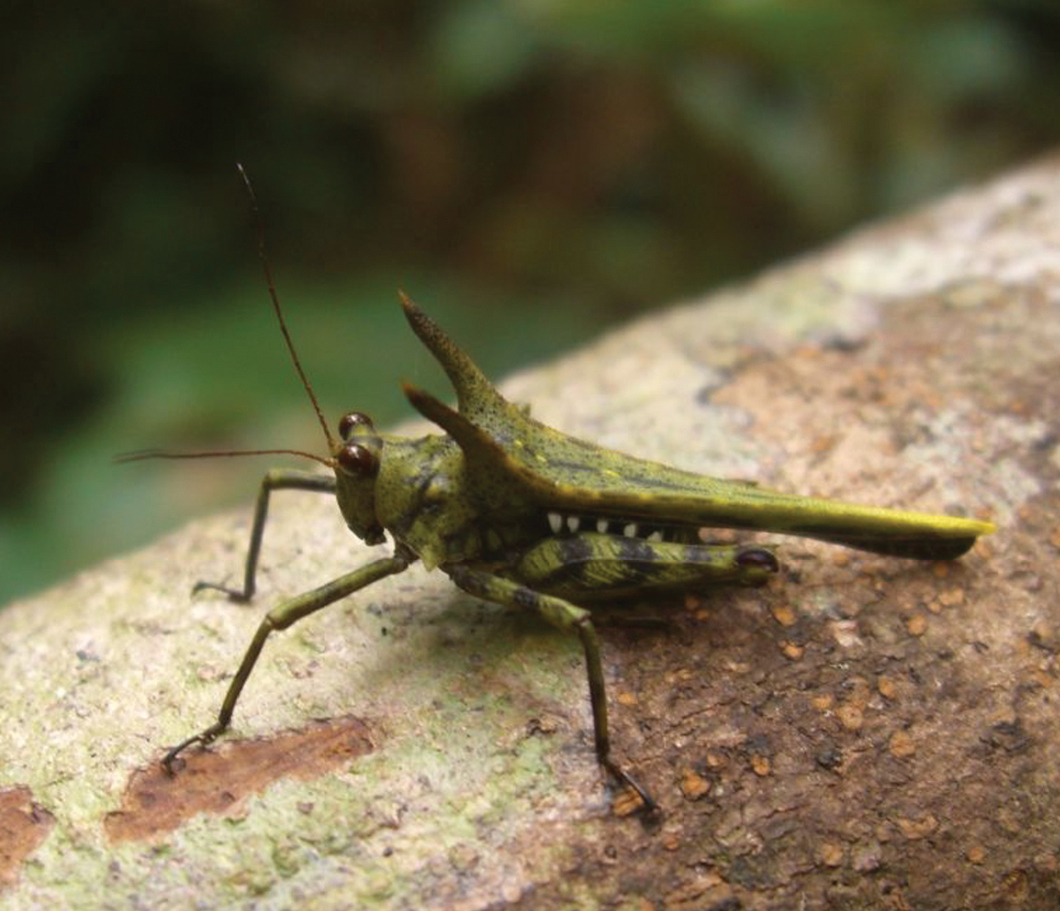
- Holocerus lucifer

Scientific classification
- Domain: Eukaryota
- Kingdom: Animalia
- Phylum: Arthropoda
- Class: Insecta
- Order: Orthoptera
- Suborder: Caelifera
- Family: Tetrigidae
- Subfamily: Guntheritettiginae
- Tribe: Guntheritettigini
- Genus: Holocerus; Bolívar, 1887
- Species: H. lucifer

Binomial name
- Holocerus lucifer (Serville, 1838)

Synonyms
- Tetrix lucifer Serville, 1838; Holocerus taurus Rehn, 1930

= Holocerus =

Genus of Caelifera

Holocerus is a monotypic genus of groundhoppers (Orthoptera: Caelifera) in the tribe Guntheritettigini, erected by Ignacio Bolívar in 1887. Previously placed in the subfamily Metrodorinae, it now forms part of the Guntheritettiginae after a revision in 2025.

== Species ==
The Orthoptera Species File currently (2025) only includes the one type species Holocerus lucifer (Serville, 1838); this occurs in the tropical forests of eastern Madagascar. Its name and appearance have prompted some to call this the "devil's groundhopper" or "devil's pygmy locust". Holocerus has included other species names, but H. taurus is a synonym and H. devriesei has been placed in the related genus Notocerus.

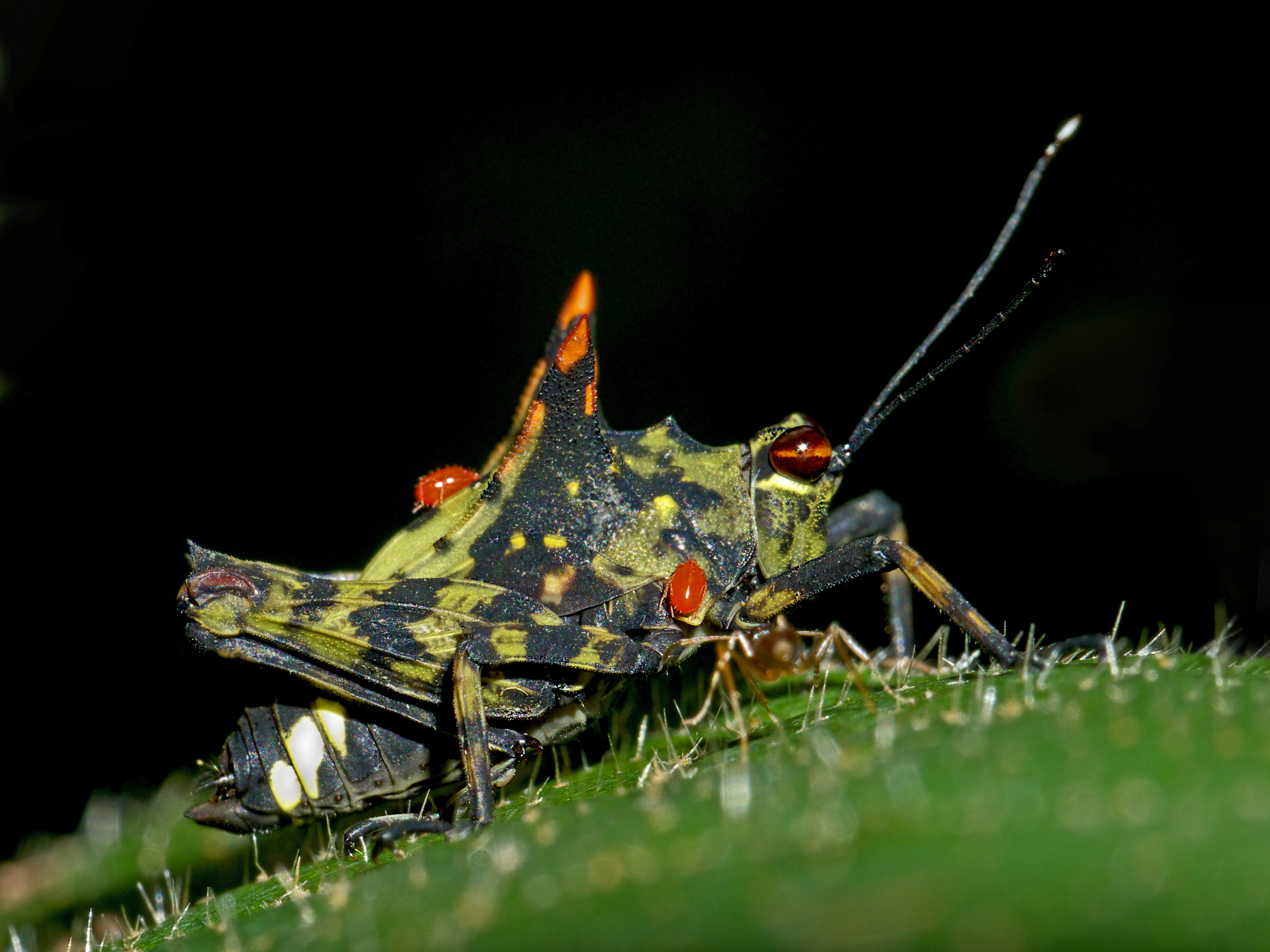
Specimen with red mites (from a Vohimena reserve, Madagascar)
