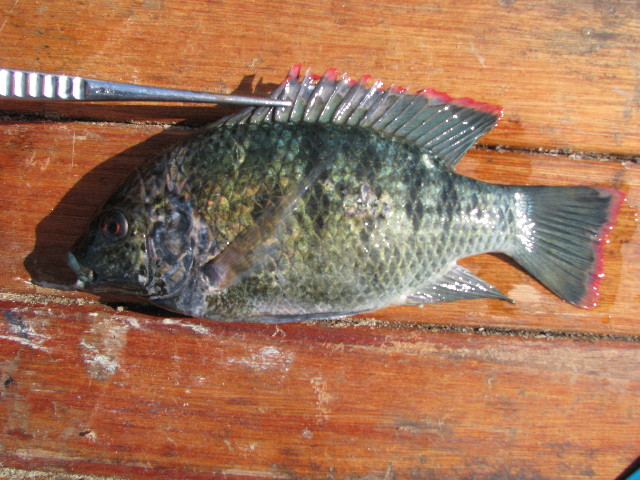

Conservation status
- Vulnerable (IUCN 3.1)

Scientific classification
- Kingdom: Animalia
- Phylum: Chordata
- Class: Actinopterygii
- Order: Cichliformes
- Family: Cichlidae
- Genus: Oreochromis
- Species: O. macrochir

Binomial name
- Oreochromis macrochir (Boulenger, 1912)

Synonyms
- Tilapia macrochir Boulenger, 1912; Loruwiala macrochir (Boulenger, 1912); Oreochromis macrochir macrochir (Boulenger, 1912); Sarotherodon macrochir (Boulenger, 1912); Tilapia intermedia Gilchrist & W. W. Thompson, 1917; Tilapia sheshekensis Gilchrist & W. W. Thompson, 1917; Tilapia alleni Fowler, 1931

= Oreochromis macrochir =

Species of fish

Oreochromis macrochir (longfin tilapia, greenhead tilapia, or greenhead bream) is a species of cichlid native to the Zambezi Basin, Lake Mweru, and Lake Bangweulu. It has been used extensively for stocking ponds and dams in other parts of southern Africa, but is little-used elsewhere. In Lake Mweru, it is economically the most important fish. The fish was introduced into Lake Alaotra in Madagascar in 1954, and proliferated quickly. By 1957, it provided 46% of the catch, perhaps because it was moving into an empty ecological niche as a phytophagous species.

This species reaches a maximum length of 43 cm (17 in). It lives in fresh water at a depth of 5 to 14 m (16 to 46 ft) in tropical climates with average temperatures between 18 and 35 °C (64 and 95 °F).
