= Tanambe =

- Location in Madagascar
- Coordinates: 17°22′S 48°27′E
- Country: Madagascar
- Region: Alaotra-Mangoro
- District: Amparafaravola
- Elevation: 770 m (2,530 ft)

Population (2001)
  - Total: 19,000
- Time zone: UTC3 (EAT)

Tanambe is a town and commune (Malagasy: kaominina) in Madagascar. It belongs to the district of Amparafaravola, which is a part of Alaotra-Mangoro Region. The population of the commune was estimated to be approximately 19,000 in 2001 commune census.

In addition to primary schooling the town offers secondary education at both junior and senior levels. The majority 90% of the population of the commune are farmers. Services provide employment for 6% of the population. Additionally fishing employs 4% of the population.
