= Anororo =

- Location in Madagascar
- Coordinates: 17°31′S 48°26′E
- Country: Madagascar
- Region: Alaotra-Mangoro
- District: Ambatondrazaka

Population (2019)
  - Total: 14,992
- Time zone: UTC3 (EAT)
- Postal code: 504

Anororo is a rural commune in Madagascar. It belongs to the district of Ambatondrazaka, which is a part of Alaotra-Mangoro Region. The population of the commune was estimated to be approximately 14,992 in 2019.
