= Ambohijanahary =

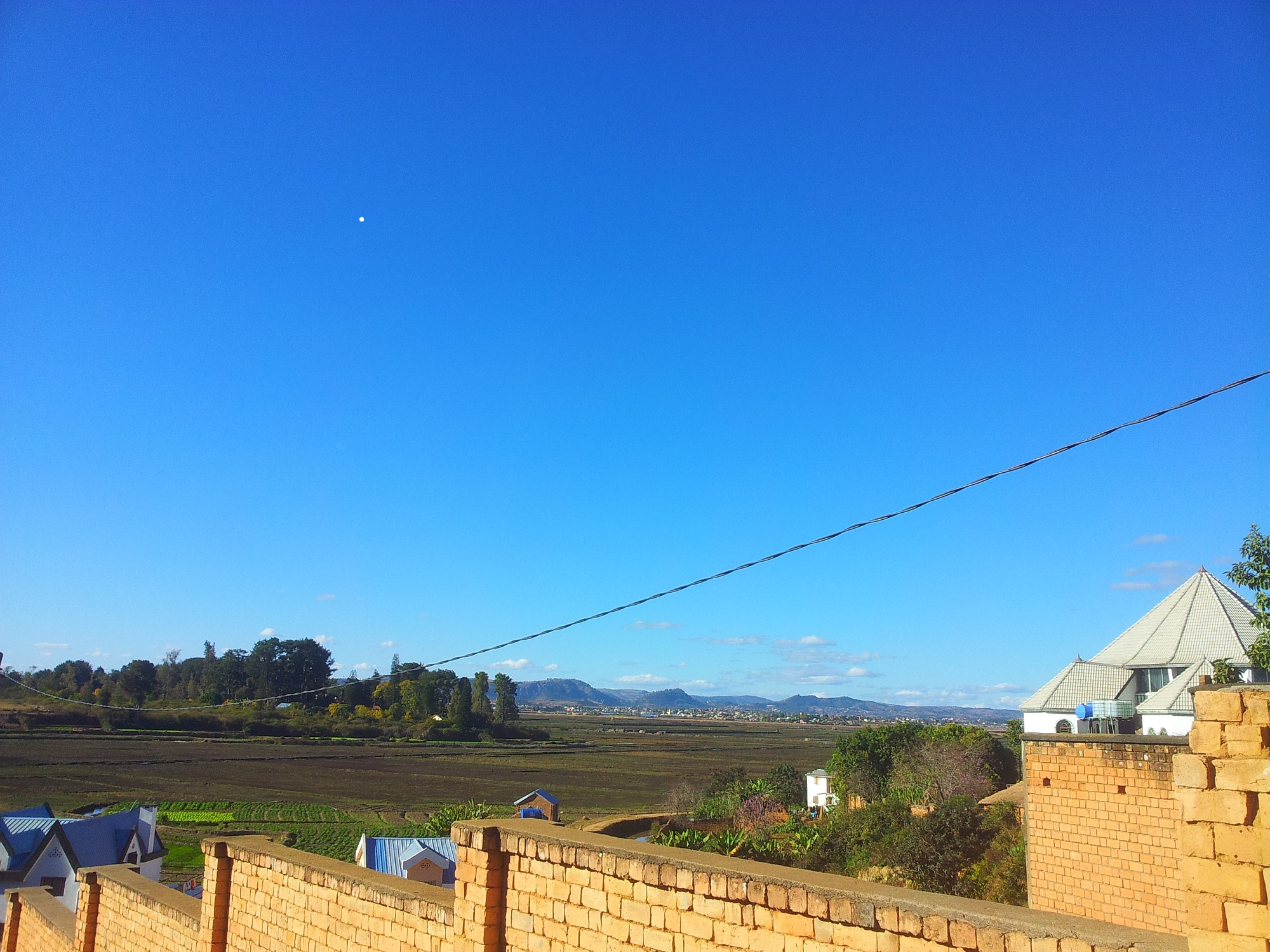
- Ambohijanahary

- Location in Madagascar
- Coordinates: 17°24′S 48°22′E
- Country: Madagascar
- Region: Alaotra-Mangoro
- District: Amparafaravola
- Elevation: 772 m (2,533 ft)

Population (2001)
  - Total: 28,000
- Time zone: UTC3 (EAT)

Ambohijanahary is a rural municipality in Madagascar. It belongs to the district of Amparafaravola, which is a part of the Alaotra-Mangoro Region, and lies on the RN3a (Route Nationale), approximately 320km from Antananarivo. The population of the commune was estimated to be 28,000 in the 2001 commune census.

The town has both primary and junior level secondary schools. The majority (95%) of the working-age population of the commune are farmers, while an additional 1% receive their livelihood from raising livestock. The most important crop is rice, while other important products are bananas and cassava. Services provide employment for 4% of the population. An airport serves the commune.
