= Sahamaitso =

River in Alaotra-Mangoro, Madagascar

Coordinates: 18°26′07″S 48°14′33″E

Sahamaitso is a river in the region of Alaotra-Mangoro in eastern Madagascar.

It is situated near the towns of Amboasary Gara, Tanifotsy and Ampangabe.
