= Andilana Nord =

Andilana Nord Andilana Avaratra
- Location in Madagascar
- Coordinates: 17°21′S 48°32′E
- Country: Madagascar
- Region: Alaotra-Mangoro
- District: Ambatondrazaka
- Elevation: 820 m (2,690 ft)

Population (2018)
  - Total: 9,042
- Time zone: UTC3 (EAT)

Andilena Nord (Andilena Avatrea) is a rural town and commune (Malagasy: kaominina) in Madagascar. It belongs to the district of Ambatondrazaka, which is a part of Alaotra-Mangoro Region. The population of the commune is 9,042 by 2018.

There are beryl deposits to be found in this town.
