= Route nationale 44 (Madagascar) =

Road in Madagascar

Major junctions
- From: Amboavory
- To: Moramanga

Location
- Country: Madagascar

Highway system
- Roads in Madagascar

Route nationale 44 (RN44) is a secondary highway in Madagascar, running from Moramanga to Amboavory along the eastern banks of Lake Alaotra until its junction with the RN 3a.

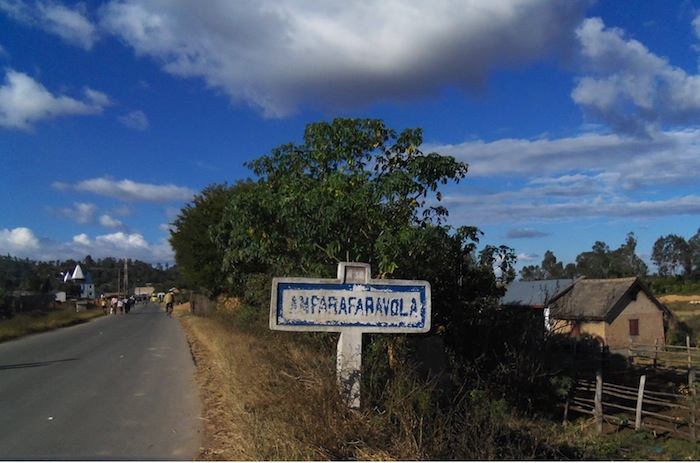
RN 44 at Amparafaravola

This road is paved and in good state only the section between Amboasary Gara and Andaingo remains unpaved.

== Selected locations on route (from north to south) ==
- Amboavory (at 228 km from Moramanga)
- Imerimandroso (at 210 km from Moramanga)
- Ambatondrazaka (at 158 km from Moramanga)
- Ambalabako
- Ankazotsaravolo
- Manakambahiny Andrefana

- junction with RN 3A

- Vohidiala ((133 km from Moramanga/RN 2)
- Andranokabaka
- Ameitanimataty
- Bembary
- Amboasary Gara (60 km from Moramanga/RN 2)
- Ambohibola
- Ilampy
- Morarano Gare
- Marovoay, Alaotra-Mangoro
- Ambohimanarivo
- Ampitambe
- Ambodirano village
- Moramanga (junction with RN 2)

== See also ==
- List of roads in Madagascar
- Transport in Madagascar
