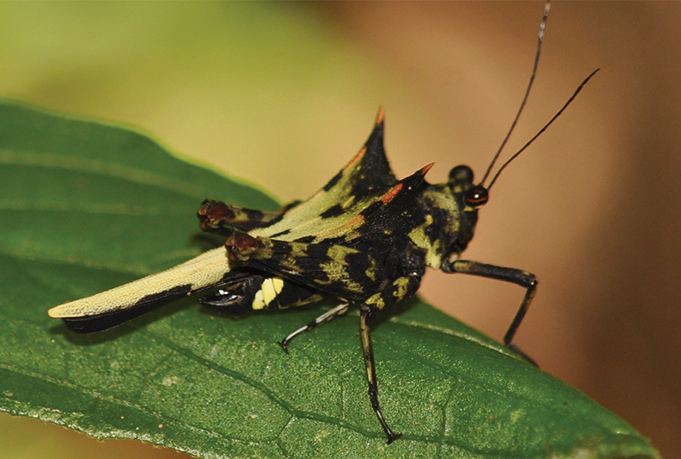
- Notocerus devriesei

Scientific classification
- Domain: Eukaryota
- Kingdom: Animalia
- Phylum: Arthropoda
- Class: Insecta
- Order: Orthoptera
- Suborder: Caelifera
- Superfamily: Tetrigoidea
- Family: Tetrigidae
- Subfamily: Guntheritettiginae; Cadena-Castañeda et al., 2025

= Guntheritettiginae =

Subfamily of Caelifera

Guntheritettiginae is a subfamily of groundhoppers (Orthoptera: Caelifera) erected by Cadena-Castañeda et al. in 2025.

The subfamily and type genus Guntheritettix were named in honour of Klaus Günther, an authority on Tetrigidae, who had originally placed G. formidabilis in the genus Notocerus.

== Tribes and genera ==
Cadena-Castañeda et al. placed genera into two tribes; the Orthoptera Species File includes the following, all found on Madagascar or surrounding Indian Ocean islands:

=== Guntheritettigini ===
1. Andriana (insect) Rehn, 1930
2. Bara: monotypic Bara turgida Rehn, 1930
3. Eurybiades: monotypic Eurybiades cerastes Rehn, 1930
4. Guntheritettix Cadena-Castañeda & Tavares, 2025: monotypic G. formidabilis (Günther, 1974)
5. Holocerus Bolívar, 1887: monotypic Holocerus lucifer (Serville, 1838)
6. Hybotettix Hancock, 1900
7. Notocerus Hancock, 1900
8. Rehnitettix Günther, 1939
9. Silanotettix Günther, 1959

=== Tumbrinckitettigini ===
1. Charagotettix Brancsik, 1893
2. Cryptotettix Hancock, 1900
3. Hovacris Rehn, 1930
4. Oxytettix Rehn, 1930
5. Tumbrinckitettix Cadena-Castañeda & Tavares, 2025
