= Ambatondrazaka Airport =

Airport in Madagascar

- IATA: WAM; ICAO: FMMZ

Summary
- Airport type: Public/Military
- Operator: ADEMA (Aéroports de Madagascar)
- Serves: Ambatondrazaka
- Location: Alaotra-Mangoro, Madagascar
- Elevation AMSL: 2,513 ft / 766 m
- Coordinates: 17°47′43″S 48°26′33″E

Map
- Location within Madagascar

Runways
Direction	Length		Surface
Direction	ft	m	Surface
12/30	(3,900)	(1,200)	(grass)

Ambatondrazaka Airport is an airport in Ambatondrazaka, Alaotra-Mangoro Region, Madagascar (IATA: WAM, ICAO: FMMZ).
