= Ambohitrarivo =

- Location in Madagascar
- Coordinates: 17°28′S 48°21′E
- Country: Madagascar
- Region: Alaotra-Mangoro
- District: Amparafaravola
- Elevation: 761 m (2,497 ft)

Population (2001)
  - Total: 23,000
- Time zone: UTC3 (EAT)

Ambohitrarivo is a town and commune (Malagasy: kaominina) in Madagascar. It belongs to the district of Amparafaravola, which is a part of Alaotra-Mangoro Region. The population of the commune was estimated to be approximately 23,000 in 2001 commune census.

Primary and junior level secondary education are available in town. The majority 80% of the population of the commune are farmers. The most important crop is rice, while other important products are maize and cassava. Industry and services provide employment for 5% and 10% of the population, respectively. Additionally fishing employs 5% of the population.
