= Ambodimanga, Amparafaravola =

Ambodimanga
- Location in Madagascar
- Coordinates: 17°34′S 48°50′E
- Country: Madagascar
- Region: Alaotra-Mangoro
- District: Amparafaravola
- Elevation: 761 m (2,497 ft)

Population (2018)
  - Total: 4,852
- Time zone: UTC3 (EAT)
- Code Postal: 504

Ambodimanga is a rural municipality in Madagascar. It belongs to the district of Amparafaravola, region Alaotra-Mangoro. The population of the commune was 4,852 in 2018.
