= Bejofo =

- Location in Madagascar
- Coordinates: 17°50′S 48°14′E
- Country: Madagascar
- Region: Alaotra-Mangoro
- District: Ambatondrazaka
- Elevation: 765 m (2,510 ft)

Population (2001)
  - Total: 13,000
- Time zone: UTC3 (EAT)

Bejofo is a town and commune (Malagasy: kaominina) in Madagascar. It belongs to the district of Ambatondrazaka, which is a part of Alaotra-Mangoro Region. The population of the commune was estimated to be approximately 13,000 in 2001 commune census.

Primary and junior level secondary education are available in town. The majority 85% of the population of the commune are farmers, while an additional 5% receives their livelihood from raising livestock. The most important crop is rice, while other important products are maize and cassava. Services provide employment for 8% of the population. Additionally fishing employs 2% of the population.
