= Maningory Falls =

- Location: Analanjirofo, Madagascar
- Total height: 90 m (300 ft)
- Watercourse: Maningory River

The Maningory Falls is a waterfall of 90 meters in the region of Analanjirofo in Madagascar.

They are situated on the Maningory River at 20 km from Imerimandroso.
