= Andaingo =

Andaingo Gara
- Location in Madagascar
- Coordinates: 18°12′S 48°17′E
- Country: Madagascar
- Region: Alaotra-Mangoro
- District: Moramanga
- Elevation: 978 m (3,209 ft)

Population (2018)
  - Total: 19,656
- Time zone: UTC3 (EAT)
- Postal code: 514

Andaingo (also Andaingo Gara) is a rural municipality in Madagascar. It belongs to the district of Moramanga, which is a part of Alaotra-Mangoro Region. The population of the commune was 19,656 in 2018.

Primary and junior level secondary education are available in town. The majority 85% of the population of the commune are farmers. The most important crop is rice, while other important products are cassava and taro. Services provide employment for 15% of the population.

== Gare ==
Andaingo Gara has a railway station on the Moramanga - Alaotra Lake line.

== Power station ==
There is a biofuel thermal power station in Andaingo. It has a capacity of 75 kw.

== See also ==
Ambodirano, a village of this municipality.
