= Andrebakely Sud =

Settlement in Madagascar

Coordinates: 17°23′8.16″S 48°37′50.48″E

- Location in Madagascar
- Country: Madagascar
- Region: Alaotra-Mangoro
- District: Ambatondrazaka
- Time zone: UTC3 (EAT)

Andrebakely Sud is a town and commune (Malagasy: kaominina) in Madagascar. It belongs to the district of Ambatondrazaka, which is a part of Alaotra-Mangoro Region. The population of the commune is not known.

== References and notes ==
- Communes - Madacamp
- ELABORATION DU PLAN DE GESTION DU SITE RAMSAR D’ALAOTRA
