= Vohimena =

- Location in Madagascar
- Coordinates: 17°18′21″S 48°35′13″E
- Country: Madagascar
- Region: Alaotra-Mangoro
- District: Amparafaravola
- Elevation: 808 m (2,651 ft)

Population (2001)
  - Total: 8,000
- Time zone: UTC3 (EAT)

Vohimena is a town and commune (Malagasy: kaominina) in Madagascar. It belongs to the district of Amparafaravola, which is a part of Alaotra-Mangoro Region. The population of the commune was estimated to be approximately 8,000 in 2001 commune census.

Primary and junior level secondary education are available in town. The majority 80% of the population of the commune are farmers, while an additional 2% receives their livelihood from raising livestock. The most important crop is rice, while other important products are sugarcane and tobacco. Industry and services provide employment for 3% and 10% of the population, respectively. Additionally fishing employs 5% of the population. Natural parks and nature preserves provide tourists with incentive to visit.
