= Amboavory =

- Location in Madagascar
- Coordinates: 17°18′S 48°30′E
- Country: Madagascar
- Region: Alaotra-Mangoro
- District: Amparafaravola
- Elevation: 790 m (2,590 ft)

Population (2018)
  - Total: 15,465
- Time zone: UTC3 (EAT)
- Code Postal: 504

Amboavory is a town and commune (Malagasy: kaominina) in Madagascar. It belongs to the district of Amparafaravola, which is a part of Alaotra-Mangoro Region. It is situated on the northern banks of Lake Alaotra. The population of the commune was 15,465 in 2018.

Primary and junior level secondary education are available in town. The majority 90% of the population of the commune are farmers. The most important crop is rice, while other important products are sugarcane and cassava. Industry and services provide both employment for 2% of the population. Additionally fishing employs 6% of the population.

== Transport ==
The district is linked to Moramanga by the Route nationale 44 (Moramanga - Ambatondrazaka - Imerimandroso - Amboavory (228 km)).
