= Imerimandroso =

- Location in Madagascar
- Coordinates: 17°26′S 48°35′E
- Country: Madagascar
- Region: Alaotra-Mangoro
- District: Ambatondrazaka

Area
  - Total: 62 km^{2} (24 sq mi)
- Elevation: 778 m (2,552 ft)

Population (2008)
  - Total: 15,195
- Time zone: UTC3 (EAT)
- Postal code: 503

Lake Alaotra from Imerimandroso

Imerimandroso is a rural municipality in Madagascar. It belongs to the district of Ambatondrazaka, which is a part of Alaotra-Mangoro Region. The population of the commune was estimated to be approximately 15195 in 2007.

== Fokontany (villages ==
9 Fokontany belong to this municipality: Imerimandroso, Ambaniala, Marovato, Vohitsivalana, Vohitsoa, Tsarahonenana, Ambodinonoka, Ankasina and Antanifotsy.

Primary and junior level secondary education are available in town. The majority 80% of the population of the commune are farmers, while an additional 4% receives their livelihood from raising livestock. The most important crops are cowpeas and peanuts, while other important agricultural products are maize, cassava and rice. Services provide employment for 1% of the population. Additionally fishing employs 15% of the population.

== Transport ==
The district is linked to Moramanga by the Route nationale 44 (Moramanga - Ambatondrazaka - Imerimandroso - Amboavory).

== Nature ==
The Maningory Falls of the Maningory River are situated at 20 km from Imerimandroso.
