= Peyrieras Reptile Reserve =

Privately run animal reserve in Madagascar

Madagascar Exotic Reserve Peyrieras
- Chameleon eating a grasshopper

- 75 Km east of Tana
- Coordinates: 18°55′52.7″S 47°56′59.9″E

Madagascar Exotic (also known as the Peyrieras Butterfly Farm, Peyrieras Nature Farm and Mandraka Reptile Farm) is a small privately run reserve (or zoo) at Marozevo, on National Road N2, 75 km (47 mi) east of Antananarivo, between the towns of Manjakandriana and Moramanga. It is a popular tourist stop between Antananarivo and Madagascar's Andasibe-Mantadia National Park.

It was founded and owned by the French entomologist and naturalist André Peyriéras, which is why it is also known as the Reserve Peyrieras.

The collection includes many reptiles (chameleons, iguanas, geckos, frogs), batraciens (amphibians), crocodiles and papillons (butterflies). The adjacent forest area supports families of relocated and habituated Verreaux's sifaka and common brown lemur which provide opportunities to photograph them close up at feeding times.

Most of the reptiles and other species are held within several large caged buildings and greenhouses, which tourists may enter when accompanied by a guide. A group of Coquerel's sifaka return daily to be fed and to aid photography by the tourists.
