= Ambohimandroso, Ambatondrazaka =

Ambohimandroso
- Location in Madagascar
- Coordinates: 19°32′S 47°26′E
- Country: Madagascar
- Region: Alaotra-Mangoro
- District: Ambatondrazaka
- Time zone: UTC3 (EAT)

Ambohimandroso is a town and commune (Malagasy: kaominina) in Madagascar. It belongs to the district of Ambatondrazaka, which is a part of Alaotra-Mangoro Region. The population of the commune is not known.

== Rivers ==
It is located at the Onive River.
