= Amparafaravola =

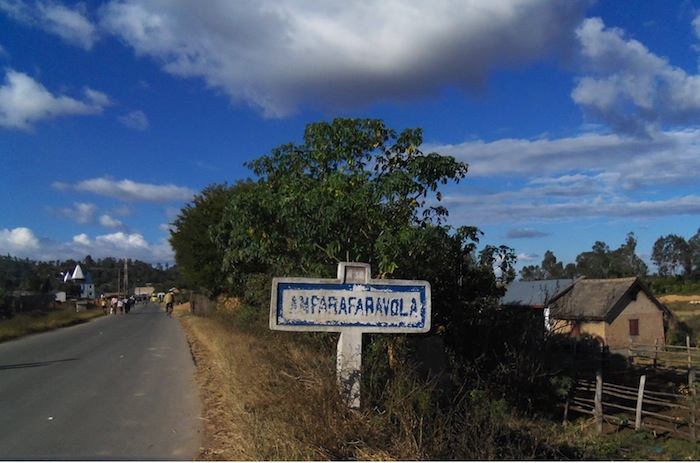
- Amparafaravola

- Location in Madagascar
- Coordinates: 17°35′S 48°13′E
- Country: Madagascar
- Region: Alaotra-Mangoro
- District: Amparafaravola
- Established: 1990

Area
  - Total: 640.15 km^{2} (247.16 sq mi)
- Elevation: 792 m (2,598 ft)

Population (2018)
  - Total: 33,299
- Time zone: UTC3 (EAT)
- Postal code: 504

Amparafaravola is a rural municipality in Madagascar. It belongs to the district of Amparafaravola, which is a part of Alaotra-Mangoro Region. The population of the municipality was 33,299 in 2018 that are distributed in 21 Fokontany (villages) that are: Marotaolana, Antanambao, Ambohimandroso, Ambohipeno, Maritampona, Ampasimbola, Ambalamirahona, Analamiranga, Amparafaravola, Ambodihasina, Besarety, Ambalafarisoa, Ampilahoana, Antsakoana, Morarano-Nord, Ambodimanga, Ambondrona, Andilana Sud, Sahamamy, Ambondroala and Ambohivorikely. It is situated at 65 km from Ambatondrazaka.

In addition to primary schooling, the town offers secondary education at both junior and senior levels. The town provides access to hospital services for its citizens. Over 80% of the population of the commune are farmers and 10% receive their livelihood from raising livestock. The most important crop is rice. Other important agricultural products include maize and cassava. Industry and services provide employment for 1% and 8% of the population, respectively. Additionally, fishing employs 1% of the population.

== Infrastructures ==
The National Road 3a crosses this municipality in its West.
