= Maningory River =

River in Madagascar

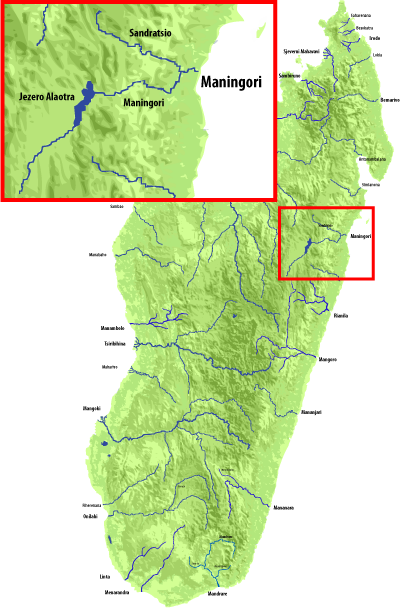

Location
- Country: Madagascar
- Region: Analanjirofo
- City: Ampasina Maningory

Physical characteristics
- Source
  - location: Lake Alaotra
  - elevation: 750 m (2,460 ft)
- Mouth: Indian Ocean
  - location: Antakobola, Analanampotsy
  - coordinates: 17°12′21″S 49°27′45″E
  - elevation: 0 m (0 ft)
- Length: 260 km (160 mi)
- Basin size: 12,646 km^{2} (4,883 sq mi)
- Discharge
  - location: Near mouth
  - average: (Period: 1971–2000)776.1 m^{3}/s (27,410 cu ft/s)

Basin features
- River system: Maningory River
- Tributaries
  - left: Sandratsio
  - right: Sahalavy, Manananaka

Maningory is a river in the region of Analanjirofo in north-eastern Madagascar. It takes it source in Lake Alaotra and flows into the Indian Ocean near Antakobola.

The Maningory Falls of 90 meters are situated 20 km from Imerimandroso.

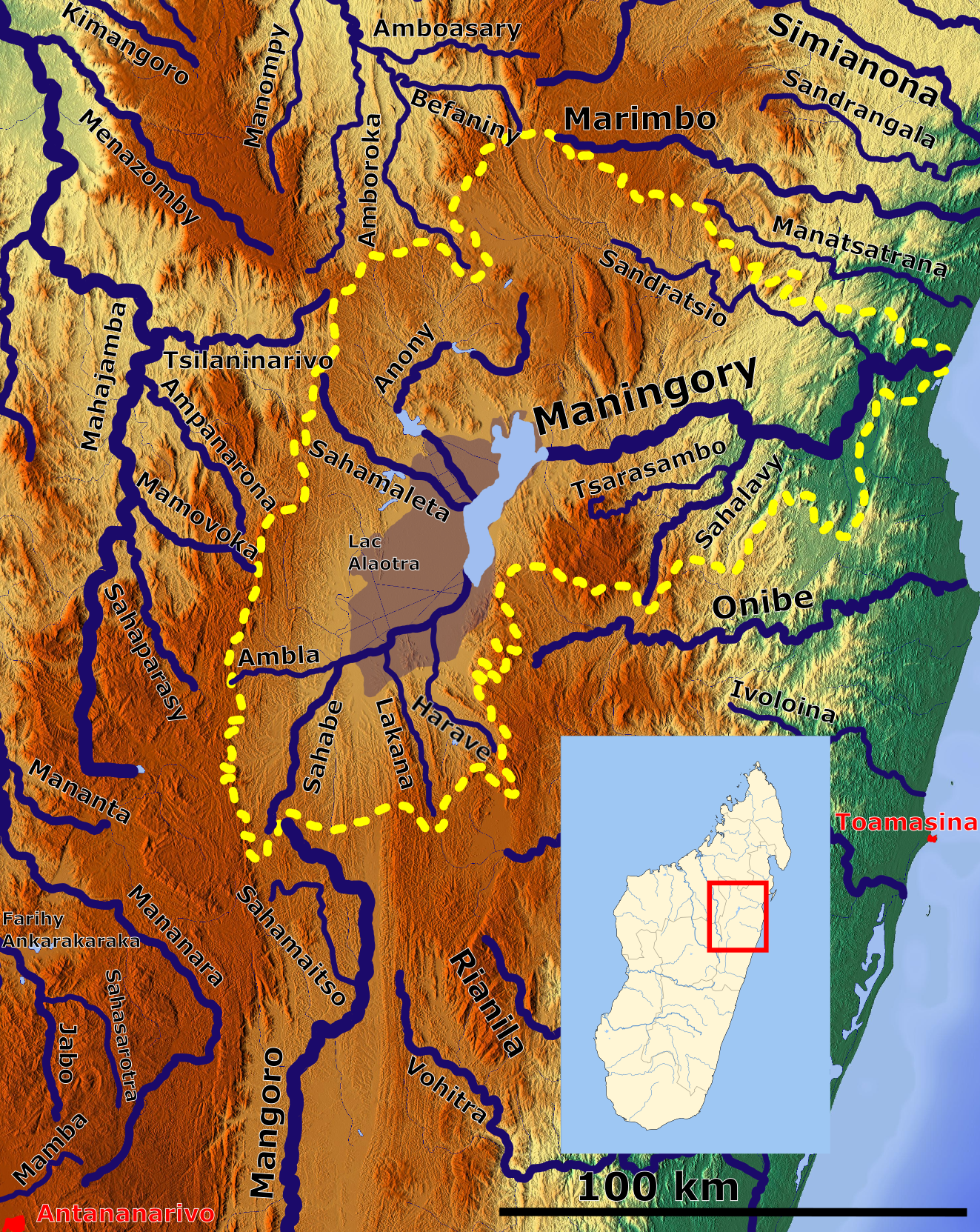
Maningory Basin OSM
