= Moramanga =

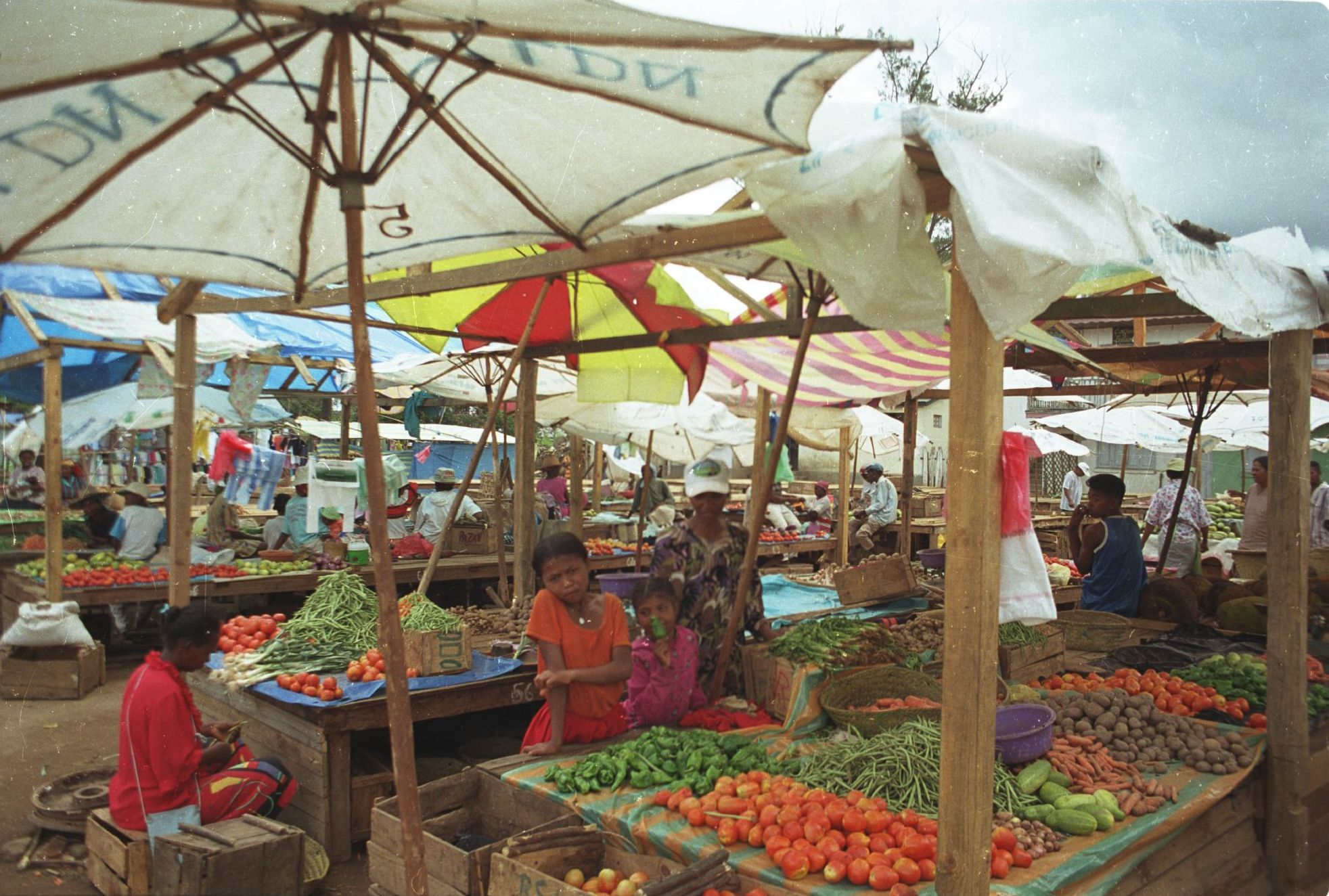
- Moramanga market

- Location in Madagascar
- Coordinates: 18°56′49″S 48°13′49″E
- Country: Madagascar
- Region: Alaotra-Mangoro
- District: Moramanga

Government
  - Mayor: Sylvain Rodolphe Ralaiarimalala
- Elevation: 980 m (3,220 ft)

Population (2018)
  - Total: 57 084
- Postal code: 514
- Climate: Cwa

Moramanga is a city (commune urbaine) in Madagascar. It is located in the region Alaotra-Mangoro and the Moramanga District. It has a population of 57,084 inhabitants (2018).

It is situated between the capital Antananarivo and the east coast on the crossroad of RN 2 and RN 44. The name of Moranmanga originates from the slave trade. To differ them from other social classes, they were dressed in blue or manga. As they were among the cheapest (mora) in Africa, it became Moramanga.

== People ==
Moramanga is also the capital city of the Bezanozano people (one of the eighteen Ethnic groups of Madagascar).

== Geography ==
Moramanga is situated on a plateau between the central highlands and the east coast.

== Transports ==
The national road RN 2 connects the city with Antananarivo (115 km) and Toamasina (254 km), the Route nationale 44 to Ambatondrazaka (157 km), Imerimandroso and Amboavory.

The city is at the TCE (Tananarive-Côte Est) and the south end of the MLA (Moramanga-Lac Alaotra) railways, making it the only railway junction in Madagascar (except for the capital).

== Economy ==
- The nickel and cobalt mine of Ambatovy is situated near Moramanga.
- Usine Militaire de Moramanga: Near Moramanga (Ambohibary) is the only armament factory in Madagascar, and is located near Moramanga.

== History ==
The city of Moramanga has an important place in the history of Madagascar. It was in Moramanga, on the night of the 29th of March 1947 that the Malagasy Uprising against French colonial rule started.

== Sights ==
A memorial dedicated to the victims of the Malagasy Uprising with many graves and wall paintings is in Moramanga. The Musée de la Gendarmerie (Gendarmerie Museum) is in the city centre.

== Churches ==
- FJKM - Fiangonan'i Jesoa Kristy eto Madagasikara (Church of Jesus Christ in Madagascar)
- FLM - Fiangonana Loterana Malagasy (Malagasy Lutheran Church)
- Roman Catholic Diocese of Moramanga (Cathedral of the Sacred Heart of Jesus).
- FFPM - (United Pentecostal Church of Madagascar)
- Fiangonana Miara Manompo Moramanga (Moramanga United Church of Christ)
- EEM Eklesia Episkopaly Malagasy (Anglican Church of Madagascar)
- Eglise Rhema Terre de Sel

== Education ==
Moramanga has 167 primary schools, 17 secondary schools and 1 Lycée.

Furthermore the superior school of the Gendarmerie (Ecole Supérieure de la Gendarmerie) is also situated at Moramanga.

== Health ==
Moramanga has dispensaries and 1 hospital as well as 2 dentists.

== Sports ==
- AS Fanalamanga, Moramanga (football and basketball)

== Wildlife ==
Protected areas near Moramanga are:

- Analamazoatra Reserve 31 km (19 mi) east along NR2
- Andasibe-Mantadia National Park 43 km (27 mi) northeast

The Peyrieras Reptile Reserve (a butterfly farm and reptile center) is at Marozevo, 40 km (25 mi) west of Moramanga on National Route NR2.

== Gallery ==
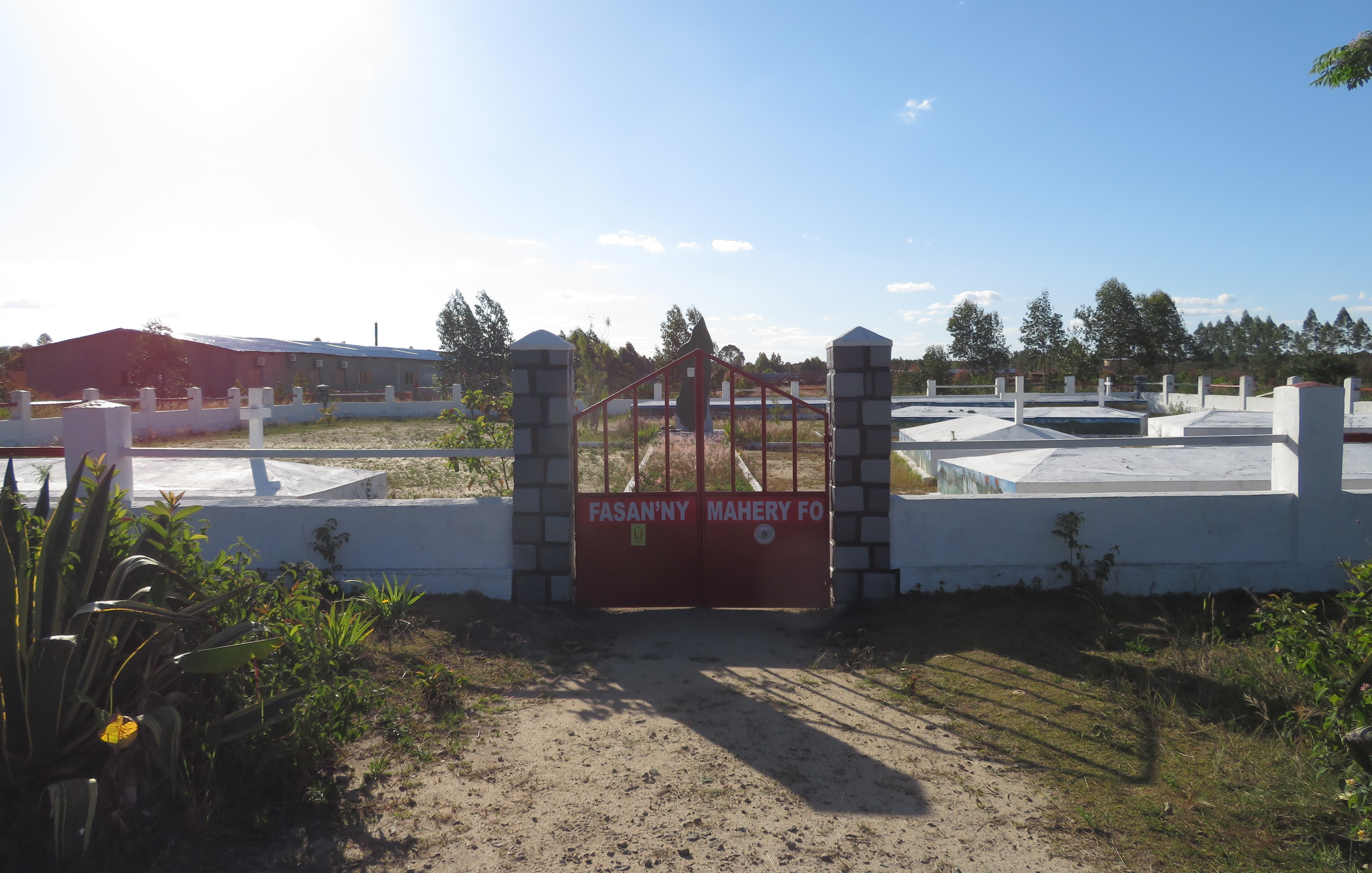
Memorial for the Malagasy Uprising (1947)

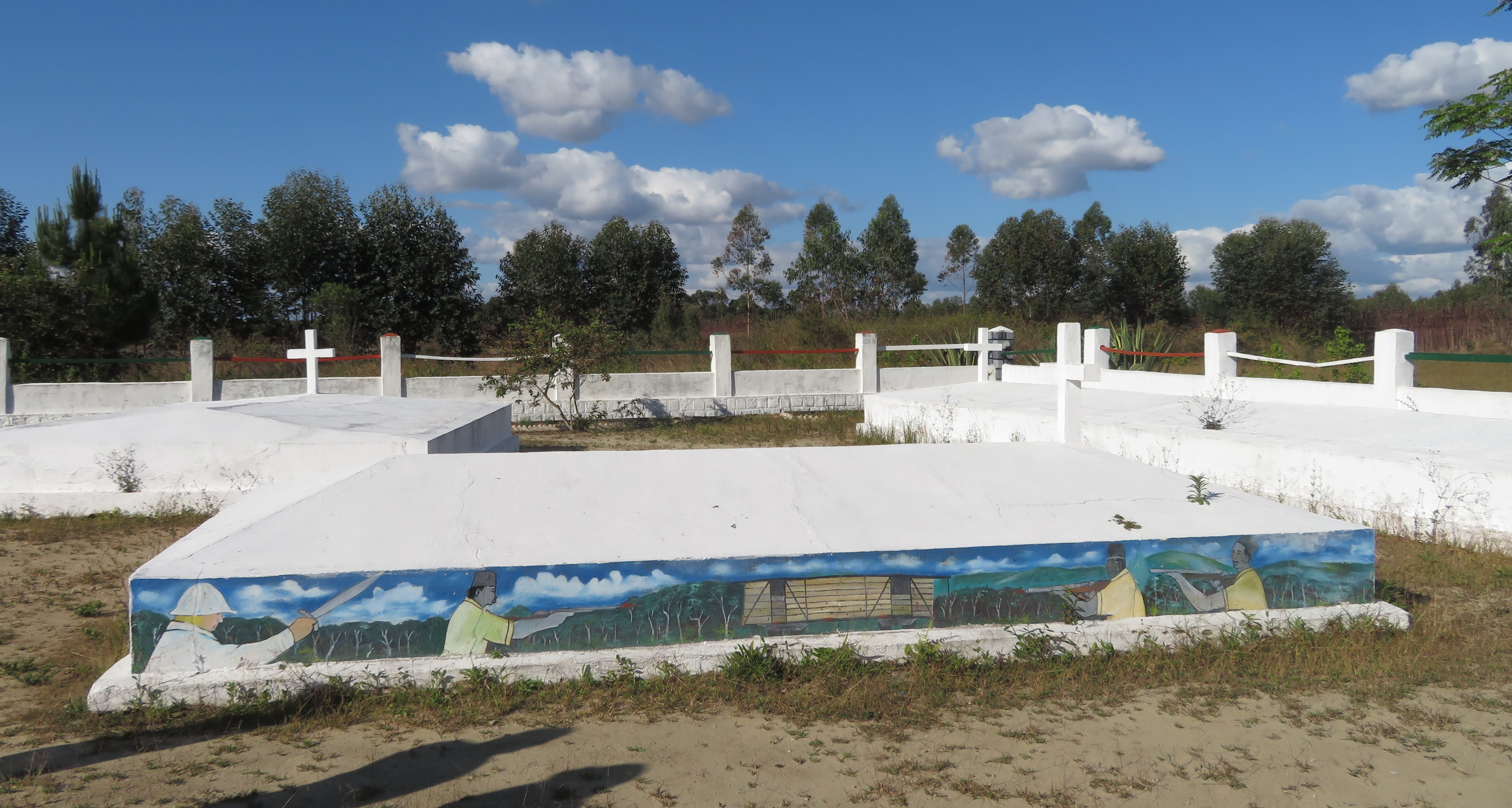
Grave of victims of the Malagasy Uprising

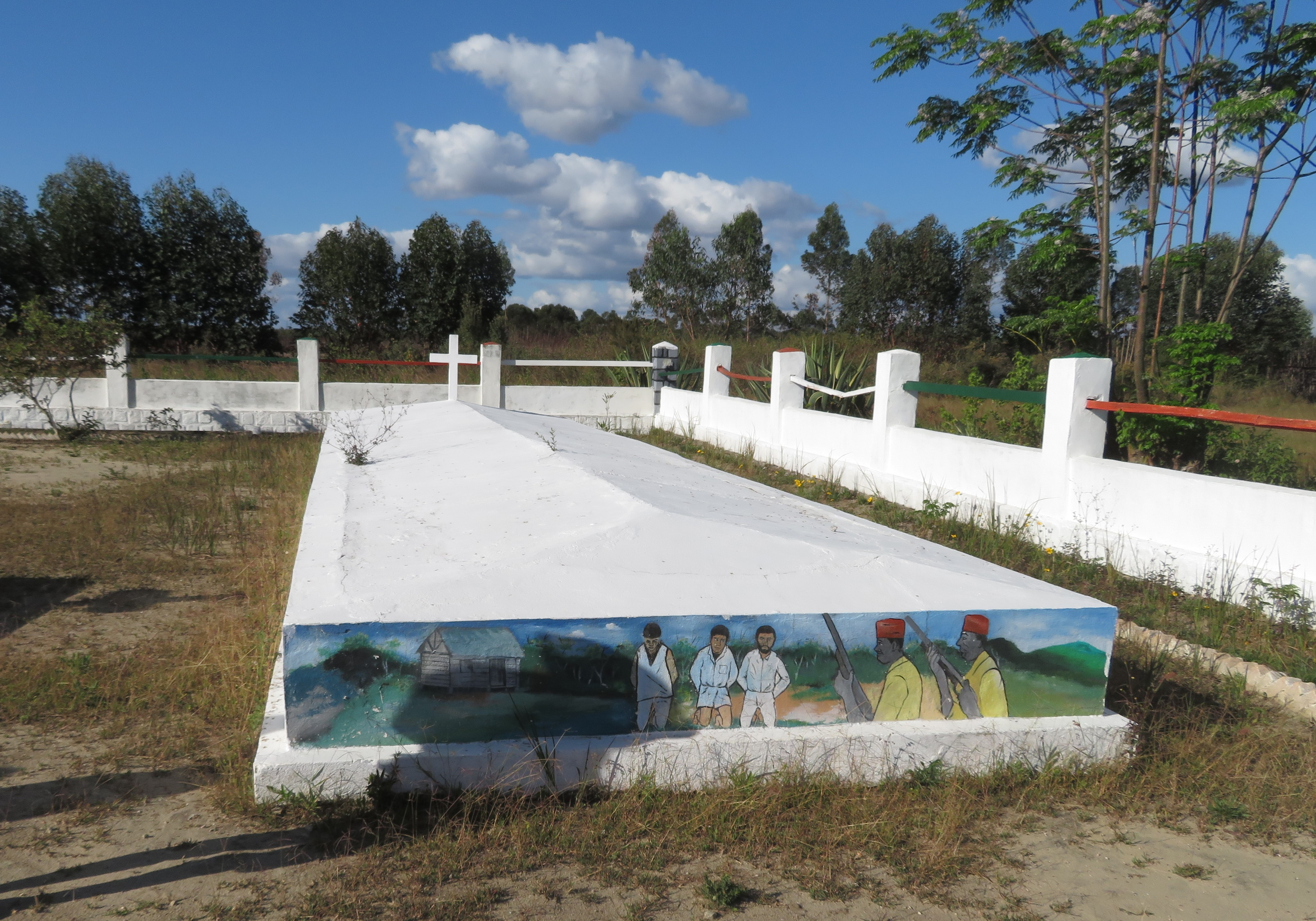
Grave of victims of the Malagasy Uprising

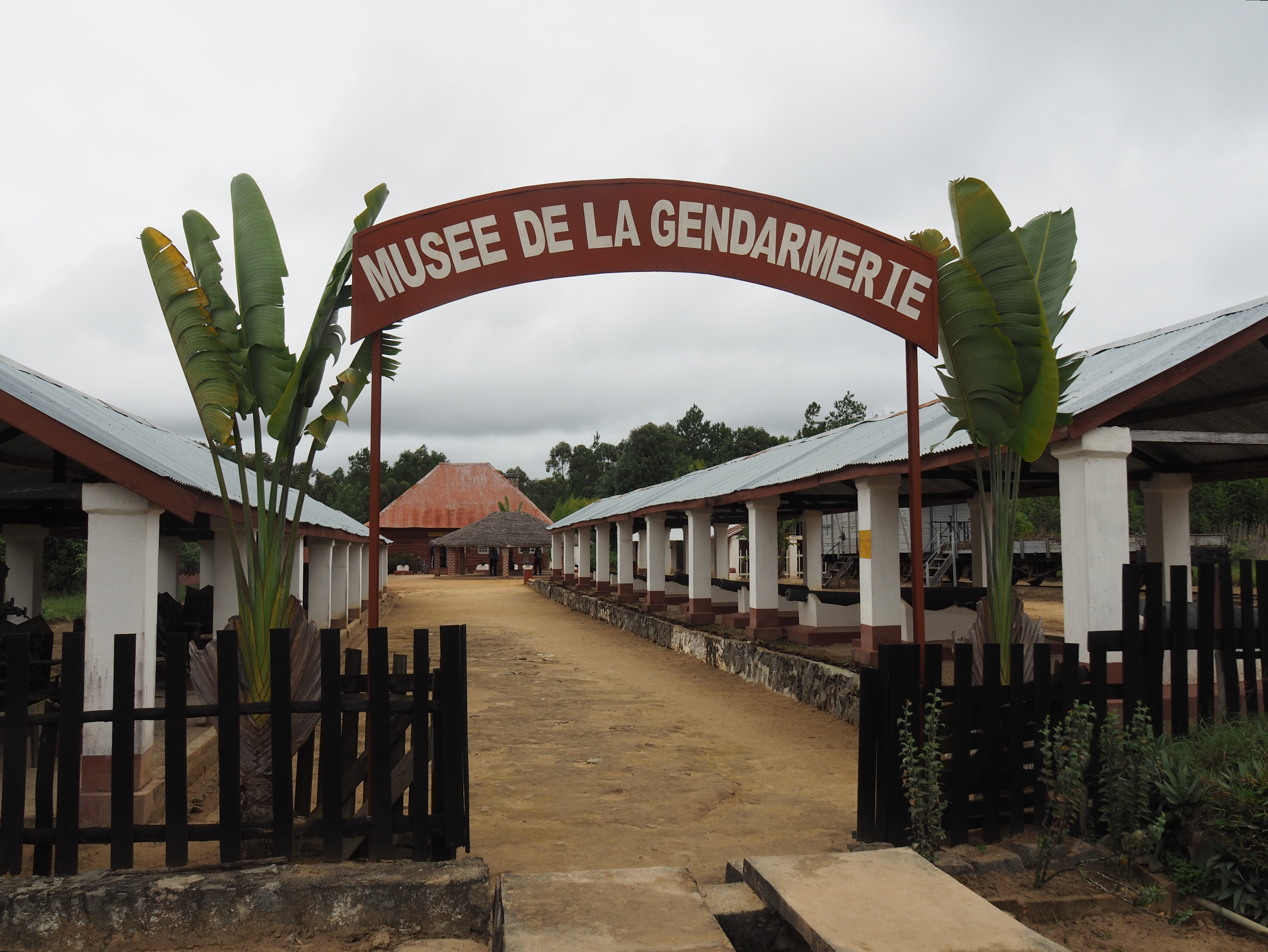
Moramanga Gendarmerie Museum

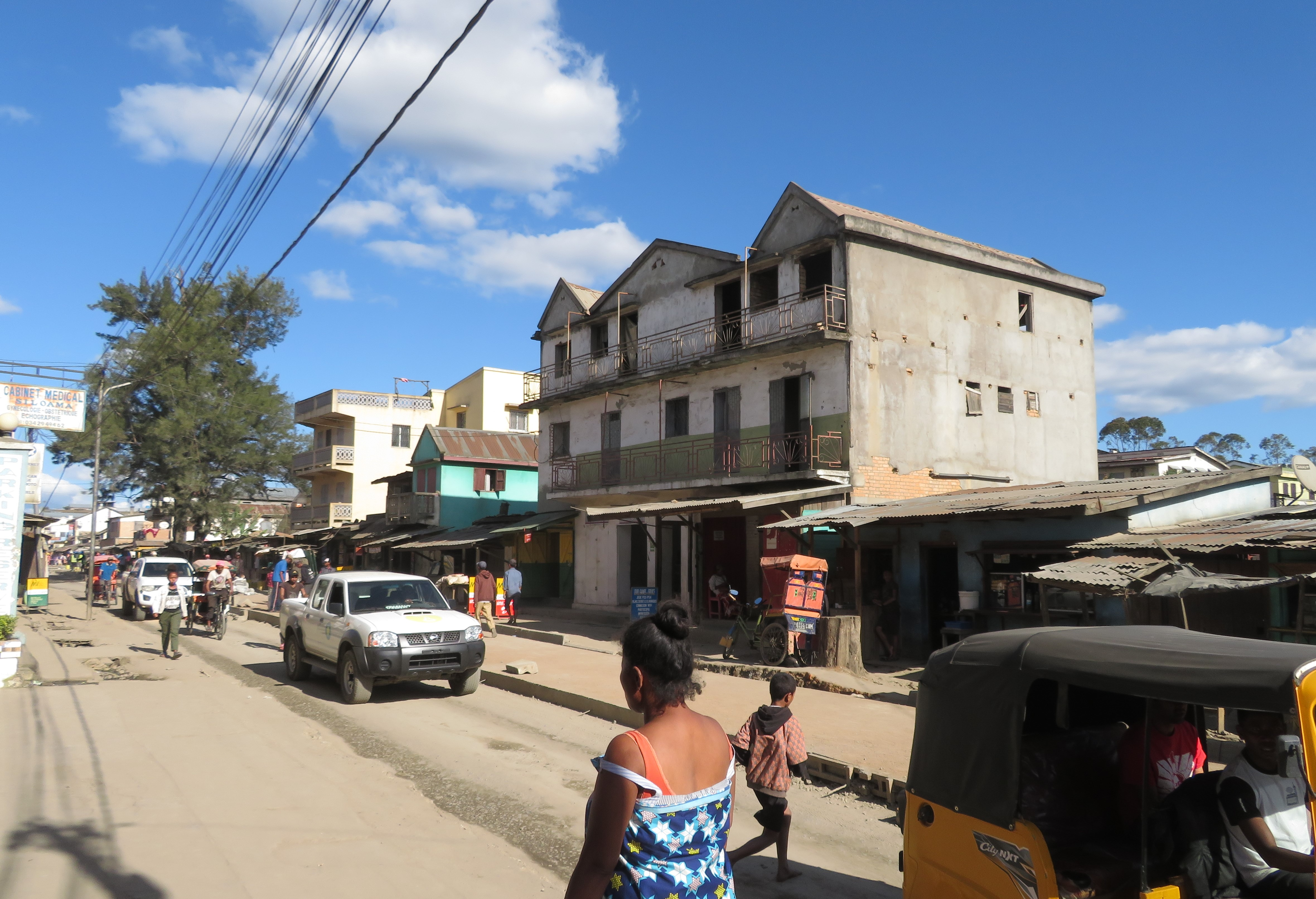
Main street of Moramanga

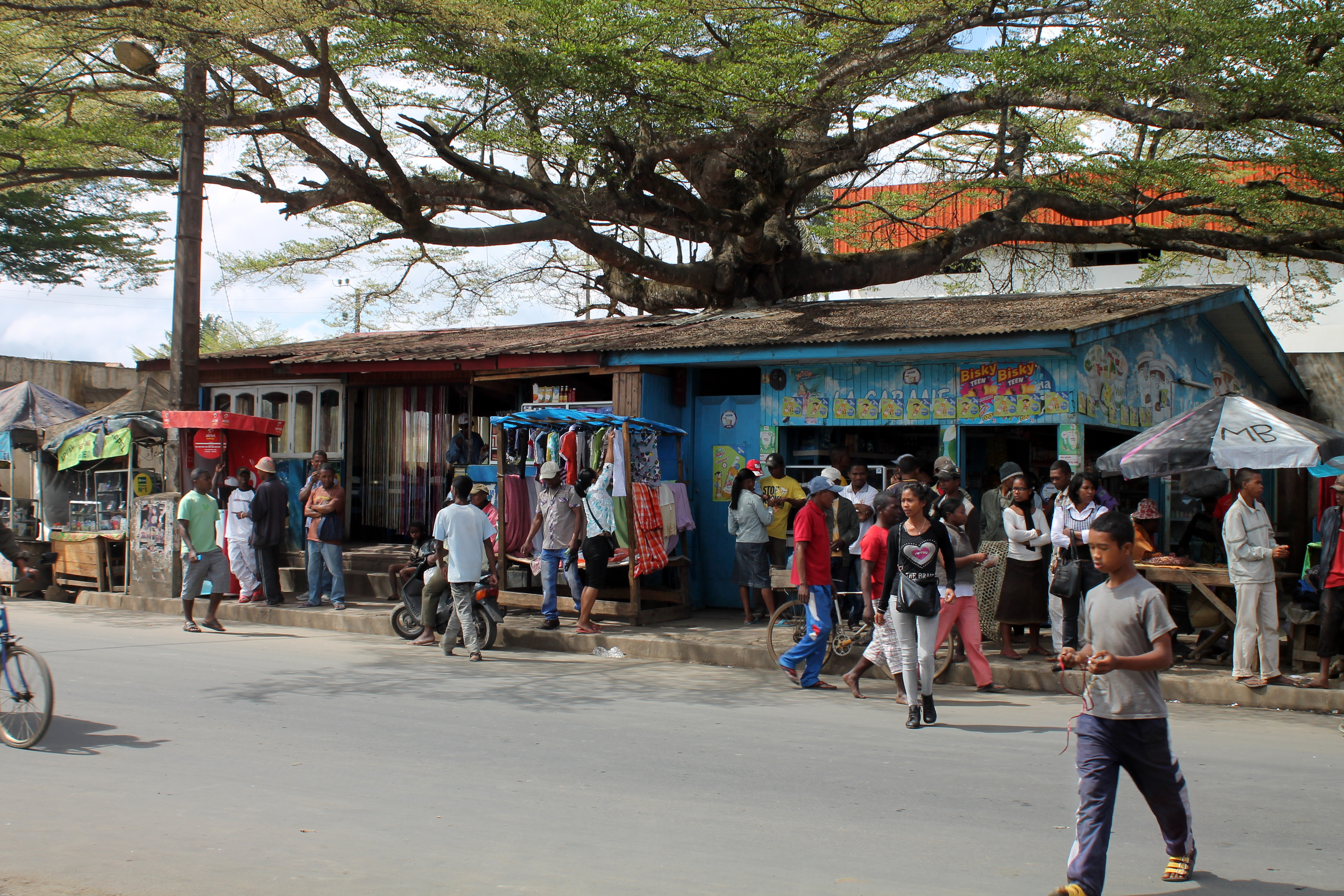
A street in Moramanga

== See also ==
- Railway stations in Madagascar
