= Lake Alaotra =

Lake in Madagascar

Lake Alaotra Lac Alaotra
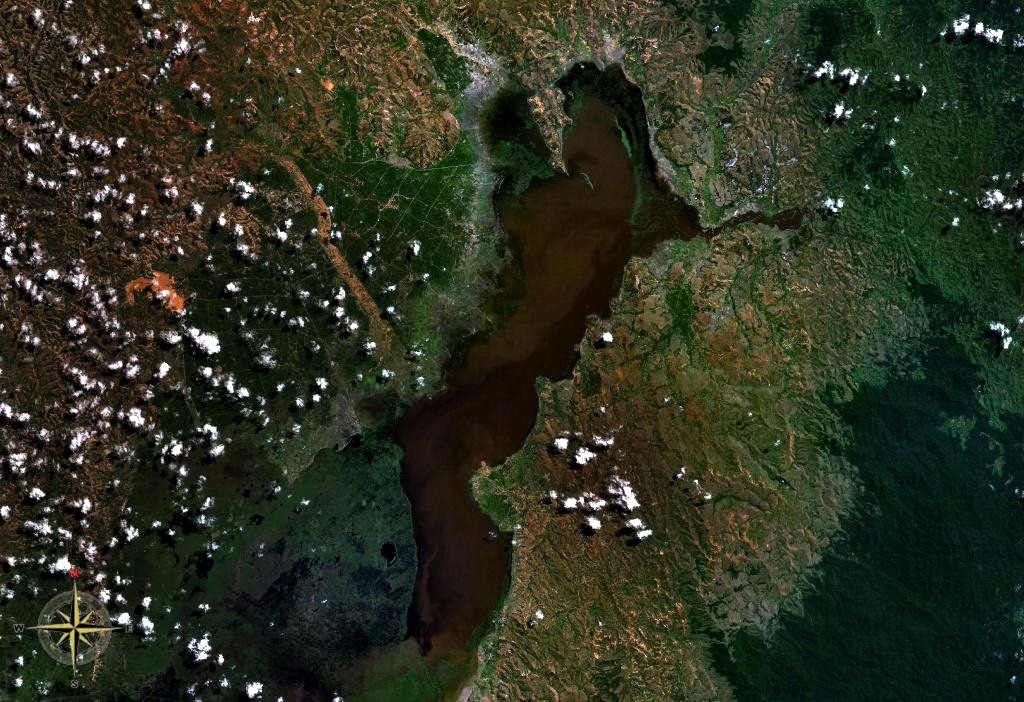
- seen from space

- Location within Madagascar
- Location: Madagascar
- Coordinates: 17.5°S 48.5°E
- Primary inflows: Ambato River
- Primary outflows: Maningory River
- Basin countries: Madagascar
- Surface area: 900 km^{2} (350 sq mi)
- Average depth: 0.60 m (2 ft 0 in)
- Max. depth: 1.5 m (4 ft 11 in)
- Water volume: app. 0.945 km^{3} (0.227 cu mi)
- Surface elevation: 750 m (2,460 ft)

Ramsar Wetland
- Official name: Le Lac Alaotra: Les Zones Humides et Bassins Versants
- Designated: 9 September 2003
- Reference no.: 1312

Lake Alaotra (Malagasy: farihin' Alaotra, [faˈrihin ˈaloʈʂə̥]; French: Lac Alaotra) is the largest lake in Madagascar, located in Alaotra-Mangoro Region and on the island's northern central plateau. Its basin is composed of shallow freshwater lakes and marshes surrounded by areas of dense vegetation. It forms the center of the island's most important rice-growing region. It is a rich habitat for wildlife, including some rare and endangered species, as well as an important fishing ground. Lake Alaotra and its surrounding wetlands cover 7,223 square kilometres (2,789 sq mi), and include a range of habitats, including open water, reedbeds, marshes, and rice paddies. The lake itself covers 900 km^{2} (350 sq mi). Lake Alaotra was declared a wetland of international importance under the international Ramsar Convention on February 2, 2003.

The longfin tilapia (Oreochromis macrochir) was introduced into Lake Alaotra from the mainland in 1954 and proliferated quickly. By 1957, it provided 46% of the catch, perhaps because it was moving into an empty ecological niche as a phytophagous species.

The fertile plain surrounding Lake Alaotra is Madagascar's most important rice-producing region. The hills surrounding the lake were formerly forested but have mostly been cleared for farmland in past decades. Severe erosion on these vulnerable hill slopes has caused considerable sedimentation of the lake, which is fast disappearing; the lake is now only 60 cm (24 in) deep during the dry season. Pressure to create more rice fields has also led locals to burn the reedbeds surrounding the lake. These reedbeds provide the sole habitat of the endemic Alaotra gentle lemur (Hapalemur griseus alaotrensis). The Alaotra gentle lemur is now limited to only 220 km^{2} (85 sq mi) of remaining reedbeds, and in recent years, its population rapidly declined by 60%, from about 7,500 individuals in 1994 to 3,000 in 2001, mostly from habitat loss, but also from hunting by local villagers.

The lake is the type locality of the butterfly Artitropa alaotrana and an important but increasingly threatened habitat for waterbirds, including the endangered Meller's duck (Anas melleri). Two waterbird species were endemic to northern Madagascar, the Madagascar pochard (Aythya innotata) and the Alaotra grebe (Tachybaptus rufolavatus). The Madagascar pochard is now critically endangered and no longer found on the lake, although very small numbers exist elsewhere. The Alaotra grebe was declared extinct in 2010. The area of the lake may have been its only habitat.

The Ambato River provides the lake with water and also drains it. After 381 km, the river flows into the Indian Ocean.

The Alaotra lake protected harmonious landscape is managed by Durrell Wildlife Conservation Trust.
