= Ambatondrazaka =

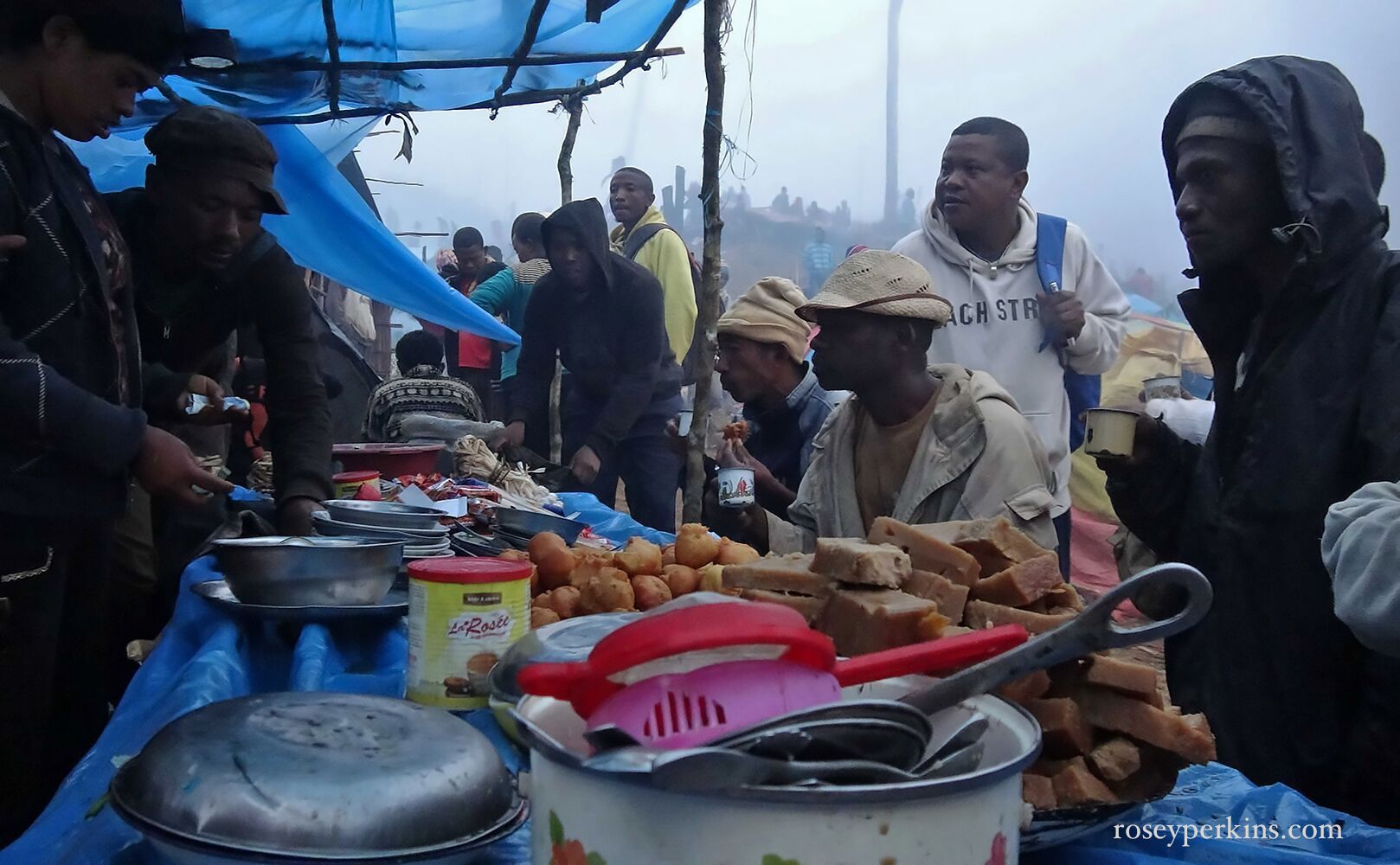
- Ambatondrazaka

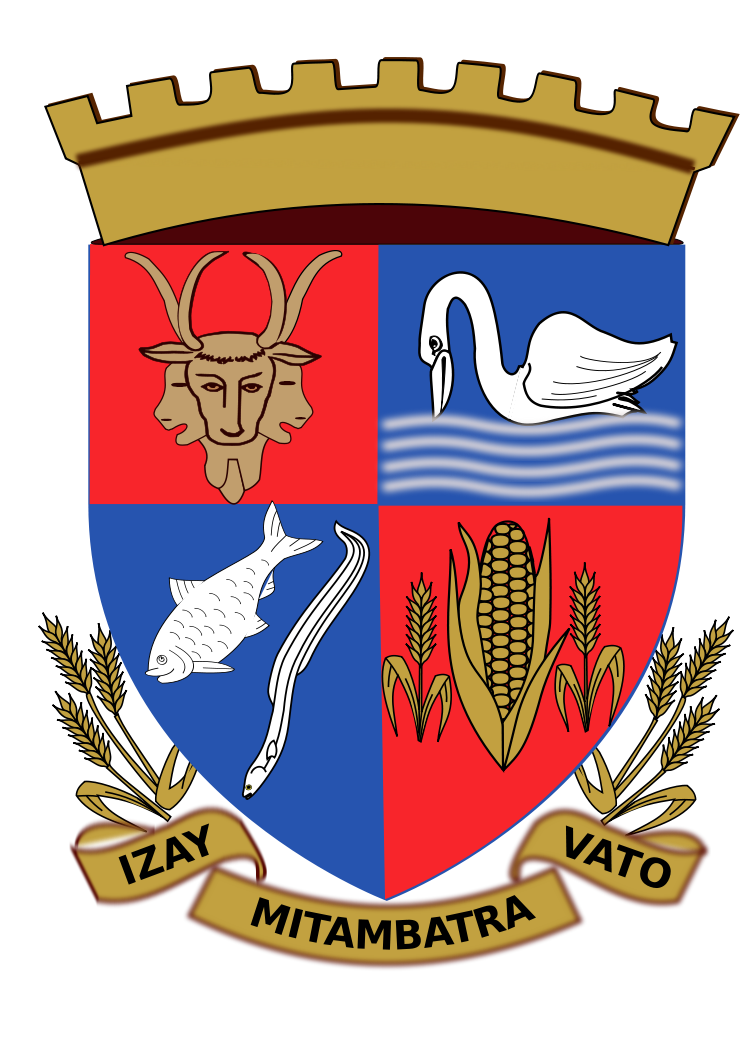
- Coat of arms

- Location in Madagascar
- Coordinates: 17°49′32″S 48°25′44″E
- Country: Madagascar
- Region: Alaotra-Mangoro
- District: Ambatondrazaka

Area
  - Total: 11.1 km^{2} (4.3 sq mi)

Population (2018 census)
  - Total: 47,649
  - Density: 4,290/km^{2} (11,100/sq mi)
- Postal code: 503
- Climate: Cwa

Ambatondrazaka (Malagasy pronunciation: [amˌbatuɳɖʐaˈzakə̥]) is a city (commune urbaine) in Madagascar

Ambatondrazaka is also the capital of the Alaotra-Mangoro region and the Ambatondrazaka District.

== Geography ==
The city is situated south of Alaotra, the greatest lake in Madagascar.

== History ==
The oral history states the town was founded by Randriambololona and children. The recorded history of the town begins with Radama I of Madagascar.

== Religion ==
The city is the seat of the Roman Catholic Diocese of Ambatondrazaka (Cathedral of the Holy Trinity).

== Transport ==
The city is at the MLA (Moramanga-Lac Alaotra) railway. There is also an airport.

The Route nationale 44 links the city with Moramanga (at 158 km) in the south and Imerimandroso - Amboavory.

== Population ==
Demographic change
2000	2001	2002	2003	2004
67 307	69 189	71 855	73026	75675
Source : PCD of the CU of Ambatondrazaka

== Agriculture ==
Ambatondrazaka is known for its cultivation of rice. It is also a tobacco producing area in Madagascar. Some 2240 farmers in this region plant tobacco.

== Sports ==
- FC Otiv (football)

== See also ==
- Railway stations in Madagascar
