= Alaotra-Mangoro =

Coordinates: 17°49′48″S 48°25′48″E

Alaotra-Mangoro Region
- Region
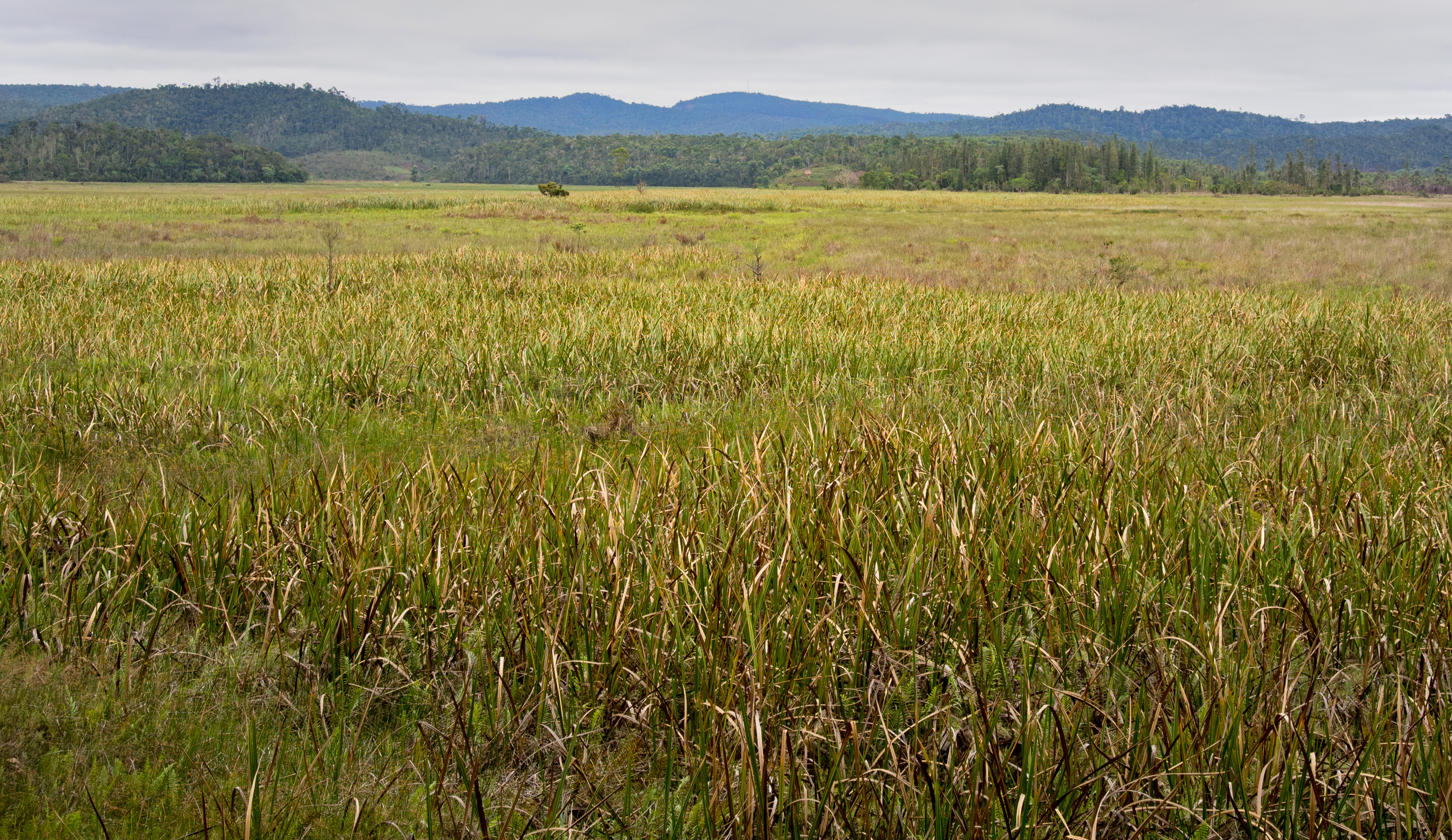

- Coat of arms

- Location in Madagascar
- Country: Madagascar
- Capital: Ambatondrazaka

Government
  - Gouvenor: Richard Ramandehamanana

Area
  - Total: 31,948 km^{2} (12,335 sq mi)

Population (2018)
  - Total: 1,255,514
  - Density: 39.299/km^{2} (101.78/sq mi)
- Time zone: UTC3 (EAT)
- HDI (2018): 0.536 low · 7th of 22
- Website: www.alaotra-mangoro.gov.mg

Alaotra-Mangoro is a region in eastern Madagascar. It borders Sofia Region in north, Analanjirofo in northeast, Atsinanana in east, Vakinankaratra in southwest, Analamanga in west and Betsiboka in northwest. The capital of the region is Ambatondrazaka, and the population was 1,255,514 in 2018. The area of the region is 31,948 km^{2} (12,335 sq mi).

== Administrative divisions ==
Alaotra-Mangoro Region is divided into five districts, which are sub-divided into 82 communes.

- Ambatondrazaka District - 20 communes
- Amparafaravola District - 21 communes
- Andilamena District - 8 communes
- Anosibe An'ala District - 11 communes
- Moramanga District - 22 communes

== Population ==
The region is mainly populated by the Sihanaka in the north, and the Bezanozano in the south. Other minorities are present, notably the Merina.

== Economy ==
=== Agriculture ===
With 120.000 ha of planted surface, the region constitutes the main rice basin of Madagascar. Other crops cover manioc (175.000 tonnes), potatoes (49.000 tonnes), corn (50.000 tonnes) and sugar cane (50.000 tonnes). Livestock (Zebu) reaches 265.000 heads and fishing 2000-2500 tons per year.

=== Mining ===
There is an important nickel mine near Moramanga/Ampitambe: the Ambatovy mine. Other mining activities are found in Andilamena, Ambatondrazaka and Didy where sapphire and ruby are mined.

== Transport ==
=== National Roads ===
- Route nationale 2 (Antananarivo - Moramanga - Toamasina).
- Route nationale 44 (Moramanga - Ambatondrazaka - Imerimandroso - Amboavory).

=== Railways ===
- TCE (Tananarive-Côte Est) railway - (Toamasina - Moramanga - Antananarivo).
- MLA (Moramanga-Lac Alaotra) railway (Moramanga - Ambatondrazaka).

=== Airports ===
- Ambatondrazaka Airport
- Amparafaravola Airport
- Ambohijanahary Airport

== Protected areas ==
- Torotorofotsy New Protected Area
- Part of Ankeniheny-Zahamena Corridor
- Lake Alaotra
- Maromizaha
- Ambatofotsy New Protected Area
- Ampananganandehibe-Behasina New Protected Area
- Ampotaka Ankorabe New Protected Area
- Analabe Betanatanana New Protected Area
- Analalava New Protected Area
- Mahialambo New Protected Area
- Mangabe-Ranomena-Sahasarotra New Protected Area
- Ambohidray New Protected Area
- Part of Zahamena National Park
- Mantadia National Park
- Analamazaotra National Park
- Part of Marotandrano Reserve
- Peyrieras Reptile Reserve (a butterfly farm and reptile center) at Marozevo

== Rivers ==
- Ivondro River
- Marimbona
- Sahamaitso
- Sahatandra
- Sandrangato
- Vohitra River
