= Moramanga District =

Moramanga
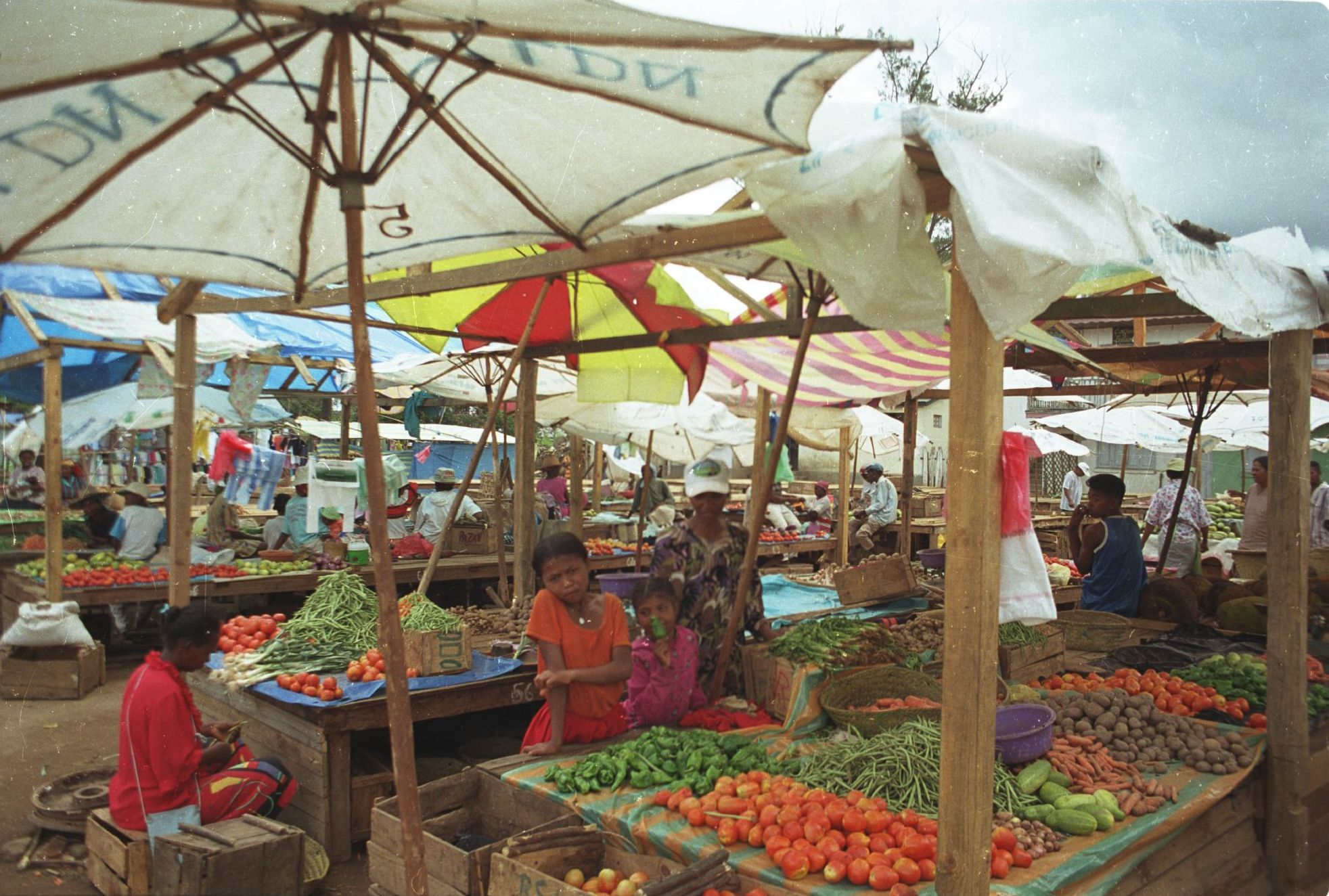
- Moramanga market

- Location in Madagascar
- Coordinates: 18°56′49″S 48°13′49″E
- Country: Madagascar
- Region: Alaotra-Mangoro
- District: Moramanga

Area
  - Land: 9,396 km^{2} (3,628 sq mi)
- Elevation: 980 m (3,220 ft)

Population (2018)
  - Total: 350,724
  - Density: 37.33/km^{2} (96.68/sq mi)
- Climate: Cwa

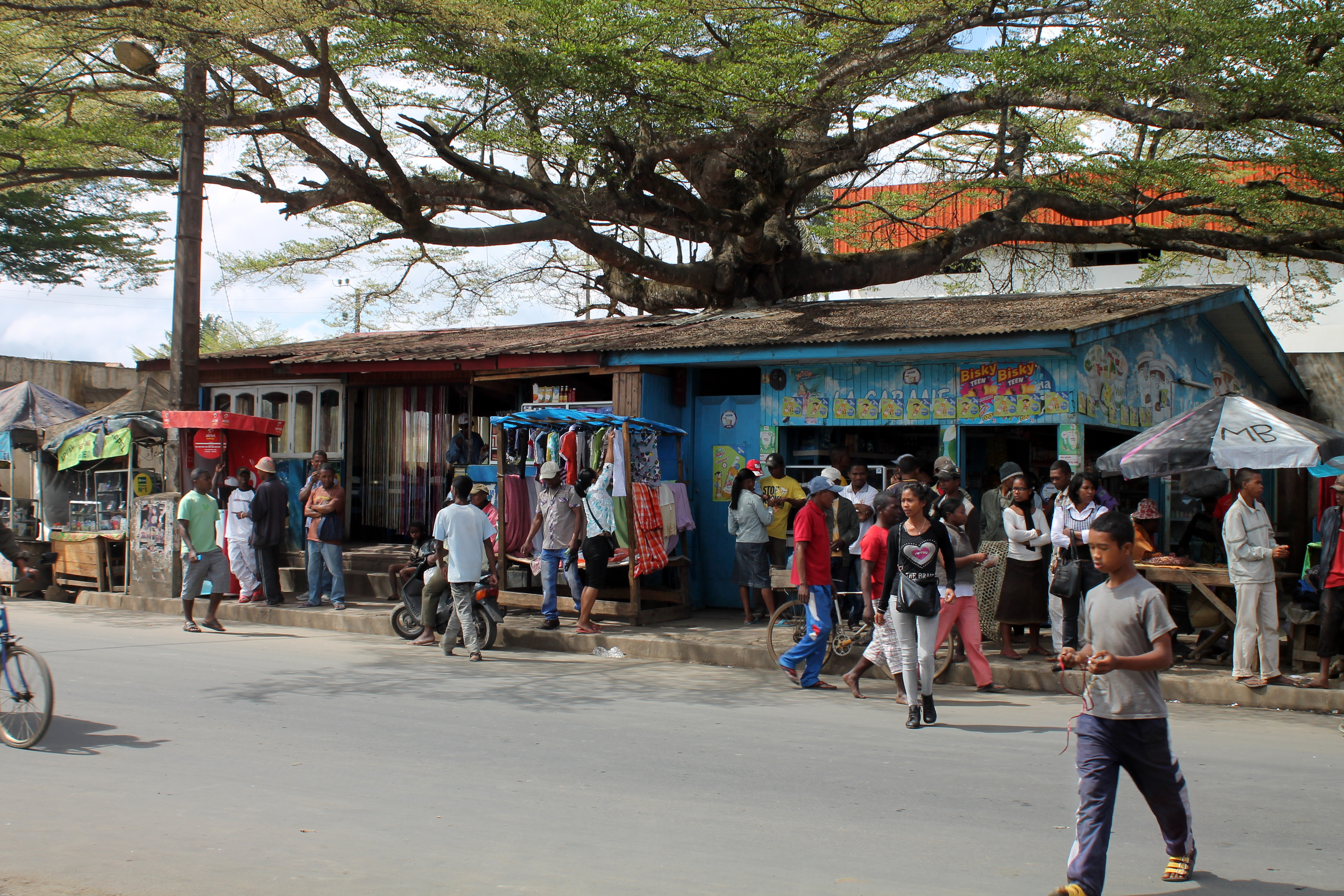
Moramanga

Moramanga District is a district in the Alaotra-Mangoro region in Madagascar. Its capital is Moramanga.

It is situated between the capital Antananarivo and the east coast on the crossroad of RN 2 and RN 44. The name of Moranmanga originates from the slave trade. To differ them from other social classes, they were dressed in blue or manga. As they were among the cheapest (mora) in Africa, it became Moramanga.

== People ==
Moramanga is also the capital city of the Bezanozano people (one of the eighteen Ethnic groups of Madagascar).

== Communes ==
The district is further divided into 22 communes:

- Ambatovola
- Amboasary Gara
- Ambohidronono
- Ampasipotsy Gare
- Ampasipotsy Mandialaza
- Andaingo
- Andasibe
- Anosibe Ifody
- Antanandava
- Antaniditra
- Beforona
- Belavabary
- Beparasy
- Fierenana
- Lakato
- Mandialaza
- Moramanga
- Moramanga Suburbaine
- Morarano Gare
- Sabotsy Anjiro
- Vodiriana

== Transports ==
The national road RN 2 connects the city with Antananarivo (115 km) and Toamasina (254 km), the Route nationale 44 to Ambatondrazaka (157 km), Imerimandroso and Amboavory.

The city is at the TCE (Tananarive-Côte Est) and the south end of the MLA (Moramanga-Lac Alaotra) railways, so it's the only railway junction in Madagascar (except for the capital).

== Economy ==
The nickel and cobalt mine of Ambatovy is situated near this town.

== Wildlife ==
Protected areas in Moramanga district are:

- Analamazaotra National Park 31 km (19 mi) east along NR2
- Mantadia National Park 43 km (27 mi) northeast
- Torotorofotsy protected area, a Ramsar site
- Part of the Ankeniheny-Zahamena corridor, a natural resources reserve
- Part of the Anjozorobe-Angavo complex, a protected harmonious landscape
- Maromizaha natural resources reserve
- Part of Ambatofotsy Protected Harmonious Landscape
- Mangabe-Ranomena-Sahasarotra natural resources reserve
- Ambohidray Protected Area

The Peyrieras Reptile Reserve (a butterfly farm and reptile center) is at Marozevo, 40 km (25 mi) west of Moramanga on National Route NR2.

== See also ==
- Railway stations in Madagascar
