= Mitsinjo (disambiguation) =

Mitsinjo is a town and commune in western Madagascar.

Mitsinjo may also refer to different places in Madagascar:

- Mitsinjo, Sakaraha, a municipality in Sakaraha, Atsimo Andrefana
- Mitsinjo Betanimena, a municipality in Toliara II District, Atsimo Andrefana
- Ambatry Mitsinjo, a municipality in Betioky-Atsimo, Atsimo-Andrefana
- Anivorano Mitsinjo, a municipality in Bekily District in Androy
- Ambohimitsinjo, a municipality in Sambava District, Sava Region

== Non governmental agencies ==
- Association Mitsinjo, an NGO in Andasibe, Moramanga that com-manages the Analamazaotra Forest Station

== See also ==
- Mitsino, a municipality in Russia
