= Ampasipotsy Gare =

- Location in Madagascar
- Coordinates: 18°58′S 48°21′E
- Country: Madagascar
- Region: Alaotra-Mangoro
- District: Moramanga
- Elevation: 964 m (3,163 ft)

Population (2018)
  - Total: 9,023
- Time zone: UTC3 (EAT)

Ampasipotsy Gare is a town and commune (Malagasy: kaominina) in Madagascar. It belongs to the district of Moramanga, which is a part of Alaotra-Mangoro Region. The population of the commune was estimated to be 9023 in 2018.

Only primary schooling is available. 70% of the population of the commune are farmers, while an additional 1% receive their livelihood from raising livestock. The most important crop is rice, while other important products are cassava and sweet potatoes. Services provide employment for 29% of the population.

Ampasimpotsy Gare is a railway station on the Antananarivo - East Coast line and is located at the RN 2 between Moramanga and Andasibe.
