= Ambatovola =

Ambatovola Gara
- Location in Madagascar
- Coordinates: 18°53′S 48°34′E
- Country: Madagascar
- Region: Alaotra-Mangoro
- District: Moramanga
- Elevation: 663 m (2,175 ft)

Population (2018)
  - Total: 7,339
- Time zone: UTC3 (EAT)
- Postal code: 514
- Climate: Cfa

Ambatovola (also known as Ambatovola Gara) is a rural municipality in Madagascar. It belongs to the district of Moramanga, which is a part of Alaotra-Mangoro Region. The population of the commune was 7,339 in a 2018.

The town provides a primary and junior level of education, and 99% of the population of the commune are farmers.

Rice, bananas, coffee and ginger are some of the town's most important crops. Services provide employment for 1% of the population.

== Nature ==
A part of the Andasibe-Mantadia National Park is situated in this municipality. It is situated at the Sanatanora river.
