= Sabotsy Anjiro =

- Location in Madagascar
- Coordinates: 18°53′S 47°58′E
- Country: Madagascar
- Region: Alaotra-Mangoro
- District: Moramanga
- Elevation: 983 m (3,225 ft)

Population (2018)
  - Total: 17,418
- Time zone: UTC3 (EAT)
- postal code: 514

Sabotsy Anjiro is a rural municipality that is composed by two towns (Sabotsy & Anjiro) in Madagascar. It belongs to the district of Moramanga, which is a part of Alaotra-Mangoro Region. The population of the commune was estimated to be 17,418 in 2018 and lies approximately 80 km west of Antananarivo, along the National Road 2 to Toamasina.

Primary and junior level secondary education are available in town. The majority 80% of the population of the commune are farmers. The most important crop is rice, while other important products are beans and cassava. Services provide employment for 20% of the population.

Both towns, Sabotsy and Anjiro have a train station along the Antananarivo East coast line. They lie at the Mangoro River. In Anjiro there are the Andriamanovoka Falls, a waterfall of 120m near the fokontany Andriamanovoka.

== Roads ==
The municipality of Sabotsy Anjiro is crossed by the National Road 2 and by the railroad from Antananarivo to Toamasina.
