= Analamazaotra Forest Station =

Area in Analamazaotra National Park, Madagascar

Ecology
- Realm: Analamazaotra Reserve
- Biome: Forest
- Borders: Andasibe-Mantadia National Park
- Animals: Indri indri, mouse lemurs, hairy-eared dwarf lemurs
- Mammal species: dwarf lemurs, aye-aye, common brown lemurs

Geography
- Area: 7.1 km^{2} (2.7 sq mi)
- Country: Madagascar
- Region: Alaotra-Mangoro

Analamazaotra Forest Station is a community-managed protected area in Analamazaotra National Park, and adjacent to Andasibe-Mantadia National Park, in the Alaotra-Mangoro region of east-central Madagascar. It consists of 710 hectares of rain forest and restored habitat. It is managed through a contract between the local community-run organization Mitsinjo and the Ministère des Eaux et Forets. Much of the forest station is being reforested with native vegetation through a habitat restoration project. Part of the David Attenborough-hosted 2011 BBC Madagascar documentary was filmed at Analamazaotra Forest Station, including a scene where lowland streaked tenrecs cross a small stream.

== Fauna ==
The Forest Station is home to an extreme variety of biodiversity. There are at least seven groups of Indri indri within the reserve, two of which are habituated to people and are commonly seen by tourists. There are also mouse lemurs, hairy-eared dwarf lemurs, dwarf lemurs, aye-aye, common brown lemurs, gray gentle lemur, and small-toothed sportive lemurs.

At least six species of tenrecs are found in and around Analamzaotra Forest Station including common tailless tenrec, greater hedgehog tenrec, lowland streaked tenrec, mole-like rice tenrec, shrew tenrecs and aquatic tenrec.

The reserve is also known for its herpetofauna. More than 100 species of frogs are found within a 30 km radius of Analamazaotra Forest Station. There are at least five species of chameleon including the brown pygmy leaf chameleon, Parson's chameleon, short-horned chameleon, nose-horned chameleon, and short-nosed chameleon. The forest station is also home to the Madagascar tree boa.
