= Conservation International Madagascar =

Madagascar programme of Conservation International

- Abbreviation: CI Madagascar
- Formation: 1990
- Type: Country programme
- Headquarters: Antananarivo, Madagascar
- Region served: Madagascar
- Fields: Biodiversity conservation; protected areas; sustainable landscapes; climate resilience
- Parent organization: Conservation International
- Website: www.conservation.org/places/madagascar

Conservation International Madagascar (CI Madagascar) is the Madagascar country programme of Conservation International. Conservation International began working in Madagascar in 1990.

CI Madagascar's work has included protected-area and forest-corridor management in eastern Madagascar, including the Ambositra-Vondrozo Forest Corridor (COFAV) and the Ankeniheny-Zahamena Corridor (CAZ). It has also supported locally managed fisheries in the Corridor Marin des 7 Baies in north-eastern Madagascar and grasslands-restoration work in the south-west.

Its later work has also included climate-finance and resilience programmes in eastern Madagascar, notably the Green Climate Fund (GCF)-supported Sustainable Landscapes in Eastern Madagascar (SLEM) initiative, which was approved in 2016 to support climate resilience for smallholders and reduce greenhouse gas emissions through measures including climate-smart agriculture and sustainable forest management.

== Overview ==
CI Madagascar has a central office in Antananarivo and regional branches in Fianarantsoa and Toamasina. The Fianarantsoa and Toamasina branches have managed COFAV and CAZ, respectively, while other work has included locally managed fisheries in the Corridor Marin des 7 Baies in north-eastern Madagascar and grasslands-restoration work in the south-west as part of Herding for Health.

The programme's work has included protected areas and forest corridors, climate resilience and sustainable landscapes, coastal and marine conservation, and restoration and livelihood-linked approaches. In 2016, the GCF approved SLEM, with Conservation International Foundation as the accredited entity, to support climate resilience for smallholders and reduce greenhouse-gas emissions through measures including climate-smart agriculture and sustainable forest management.

== History ==
Conservation International began working in Madagascar in 1990.

During Madagascar's 2009 political crisis, Conservation International linked increased pressure on some forests, including cases documented in the Daraina region in northern Madagascar, to weakened enforcement, citing lemur poaching for bushmeat and raising concerns about illegal logging.

Through the early 2010s, CI Madagascar’s regional branches developed major landscape programmes linked to forest-corridor management in eastern and south-eastern Madagascar, including work associated with COFAV and CAZ. At the 2014 World Parks Congress in Sydney, a Malagasy delegation that included Conservation International sought support for protected-area finance and management. In 2016, CI’s Madagascar work expanded from corridor-based management into a large-scale climate-finance programme in eastern Madagascar through SLEM, designed to support smallholder resilience and reduce greenhouse-gas emissions through interventions including climate-smart agriculture and sustainable forest management. Later programme work also included locally managed fisheries in the Corridor Marin des 7 Baies in north-eastern Madagascar and grasslands-restoration work in the south-west as part of Herding for Health.

== Programmes and operations ==
Selected programme locations mentioned in the article (1 Antananarivo; 2 Fianarantsoa; 3 Toamasina; 4 Ambositra-Vondrozo Forest Corridor; 5 Ankeniheny-Zahamena Corridor; 6 Corridor Marin des 7 Baies; 7 south-western Madagascar)

=== Eastern Madagascar ===
SLEM is CI Madagascar's main climate-resilience and mitigation programme in eastern Madagascar. Approved by the GCF in 2016, it operates in the CAZ and COFAV landscapes and combines climate-smart agriculture for smallholders with restoration of degraded areas and more sustainable forest management. The programme has been the subject of midterm and endline impact evaluations.

Programme implementation across CAZ and COFAV has included reforestation and restoration of degraded forest areas and distribution of forest and agroforestry seedlings across participating communes. The programme has also been associated with livelihood support for rural households and restoration outcomes in the landscape.

=== Ambositra-Vondrozo Forest Corridor ===
From its regional branch in Fianarantsoa, CI Madagascar has managed COFAV as a corridor-scale conservation programme in south-eastern Madagascar. In the corridor, community-based forest management has included patrol and fire-monitoring activities by local associations working with Conservation International under SLEM.

COFAV is a forest corridor linking Ranomafana National Park and Andringitra National Park. Peer-reviewed research describing the corridor analysed habitat connectivity and corridor structure between protected areas, providing an evidence base used in wider corridor-scale planning discussions for south-eastern Madagascar.

=== Ankeniheny-Zahamena Corridor ===
CI Madagascar has managed work associated with CAZ. In the early 2010s, the Malagasy government engaged Conservation International to manage CAZ in the context of limited protected-area enforcement capacity. Its role in the corridor has included technical support to protected-area management, including secretariat functions for a technical committee established for the protected area.

Management in parts of CAZ has also involved community-based forestry organisations (VOI) in patrols and reporting of infractions alongside CI and local authorities. The corridor links Zahamena National Park and Andasibe-Mantadia National Park and covers about 425,000 hectares (4,250 km^{2}). Research has evaluated conservation and development investments in the corridor using satellite-derived indicators of deforestation and fire across the landscape.

Pressures in parts of CAZ have included illegal sapphire mining and associated forest impacts. In 2025, civil-society groups including Conservation International raised concerns about the Antananarivo–Toamasina highway project; the government said it would modify the route to avoid CAZ and other protected forests.

=== North-eastern Madagascar ===
CI has supported locally managed fisheries in the Corridor Marin des 7 Baies in north-eastern Madagascar, where the Corridor Marin des 7 Baies du Littoral Est is listed as a marine protected area managed by Conservation International.

=== South-western Madagascar ===
CI has supported grasslands and rangeland-restoration work in south-western Madagascar as part of Herding for Health. In 2025, a related project was launched in the Atsimo-Andrefana Region, where Conservation International participated in a consortium working to revitalize livestock farming and restore 10,000 hectares of degraded rangelands. Project materials described the Herding for Health model as the core approach for sustainable grazing, land restoration, and livelihood support, and stated that implementation in Madagascar was led by Conservation International in partnership with GIZ and local stakeholders.

Selected landscapes and programme contexts of Conservation International Madagascar
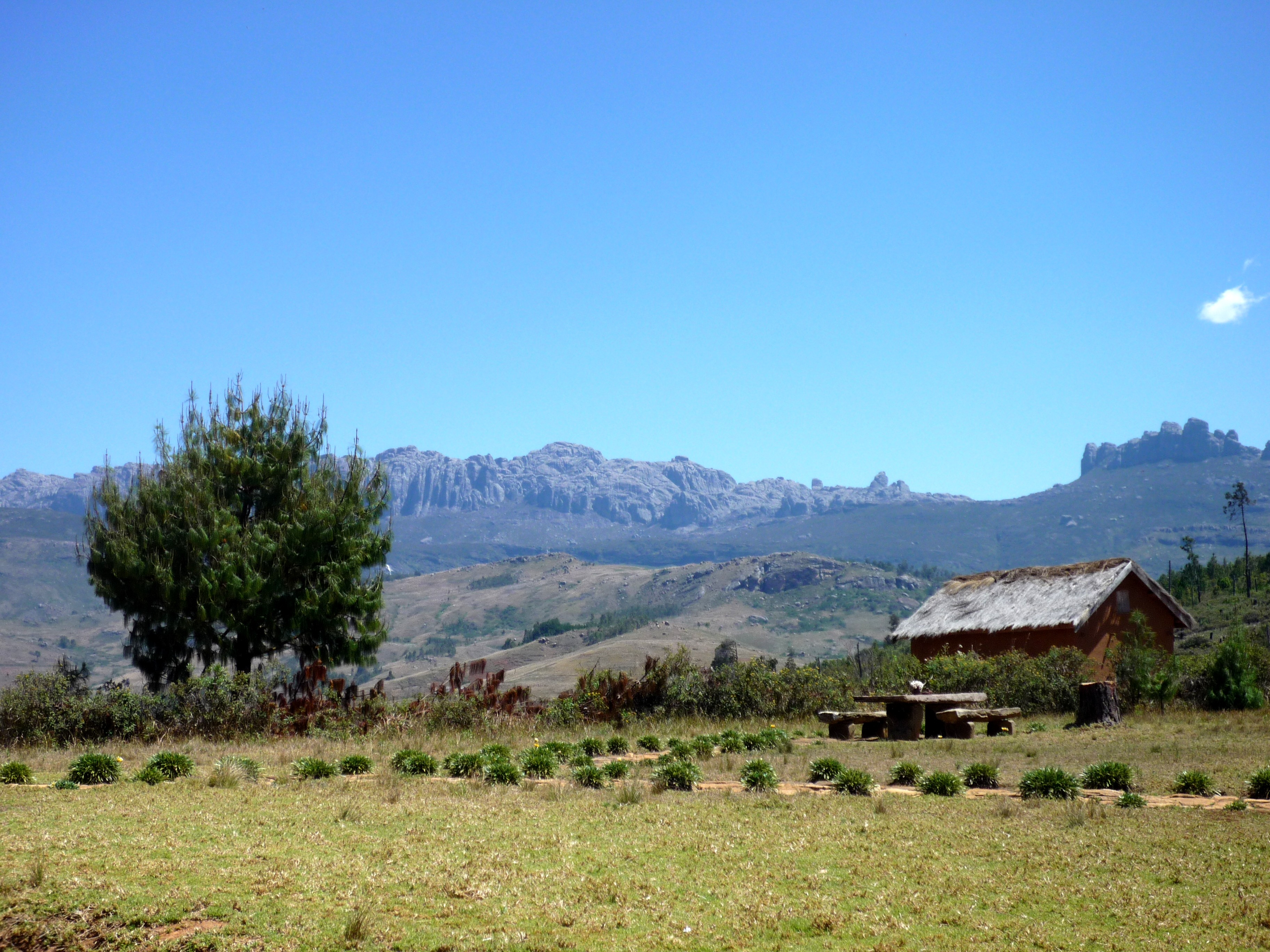
Andringitra National Park, one of the protected areas linked by the Ambositra-Vondrozo Forest Corridor

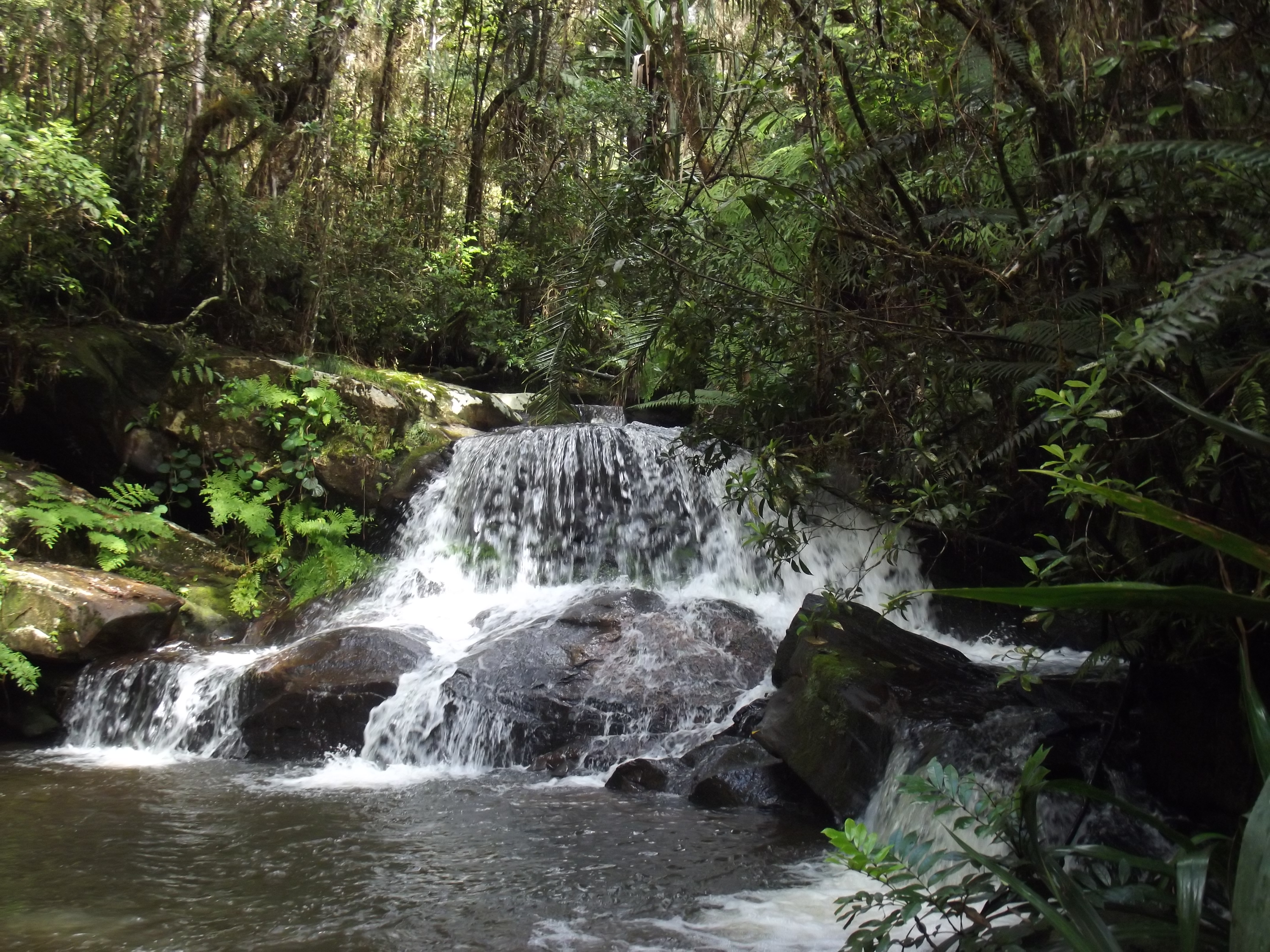
River in Andasibe-Mantadia National Park, one of the protected areas linked by the Ankeniheny-Zahamena Corridor

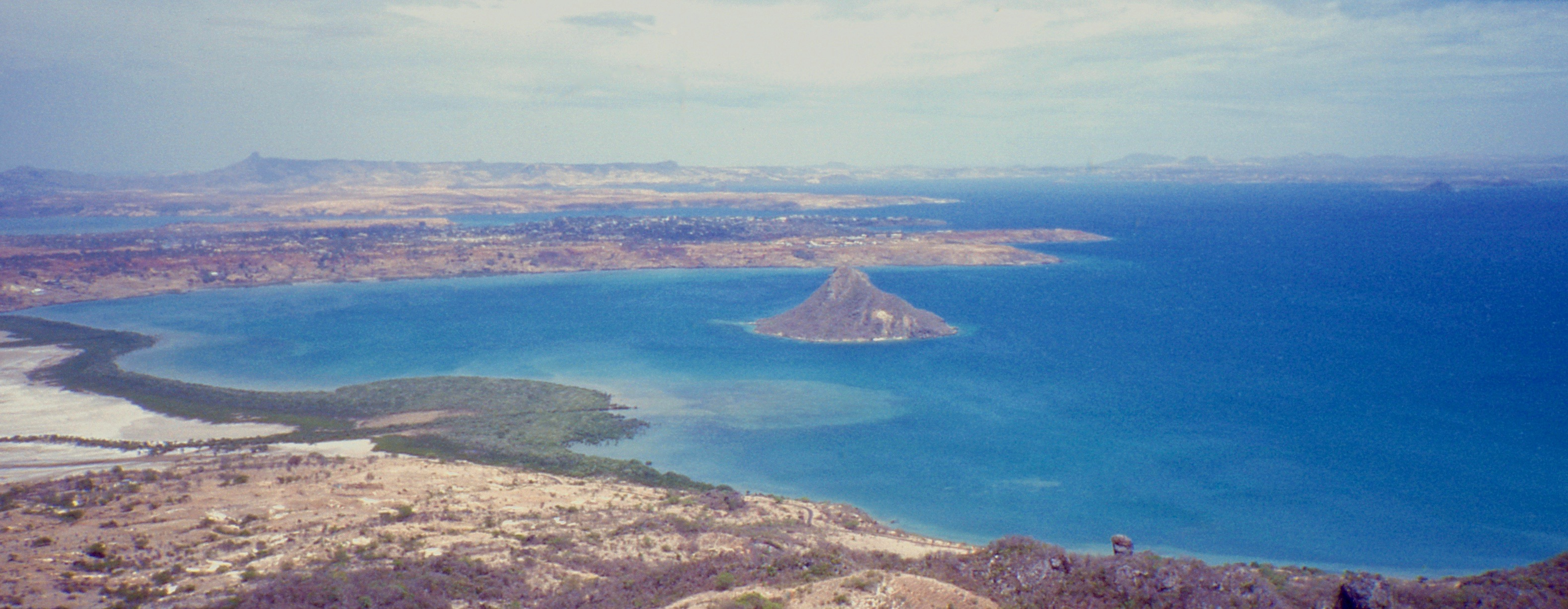
Baie d'Andovobazaha, east of Antsiranana, in the north-eastern coastal region associated with the Corridor Marin des 7 Baies

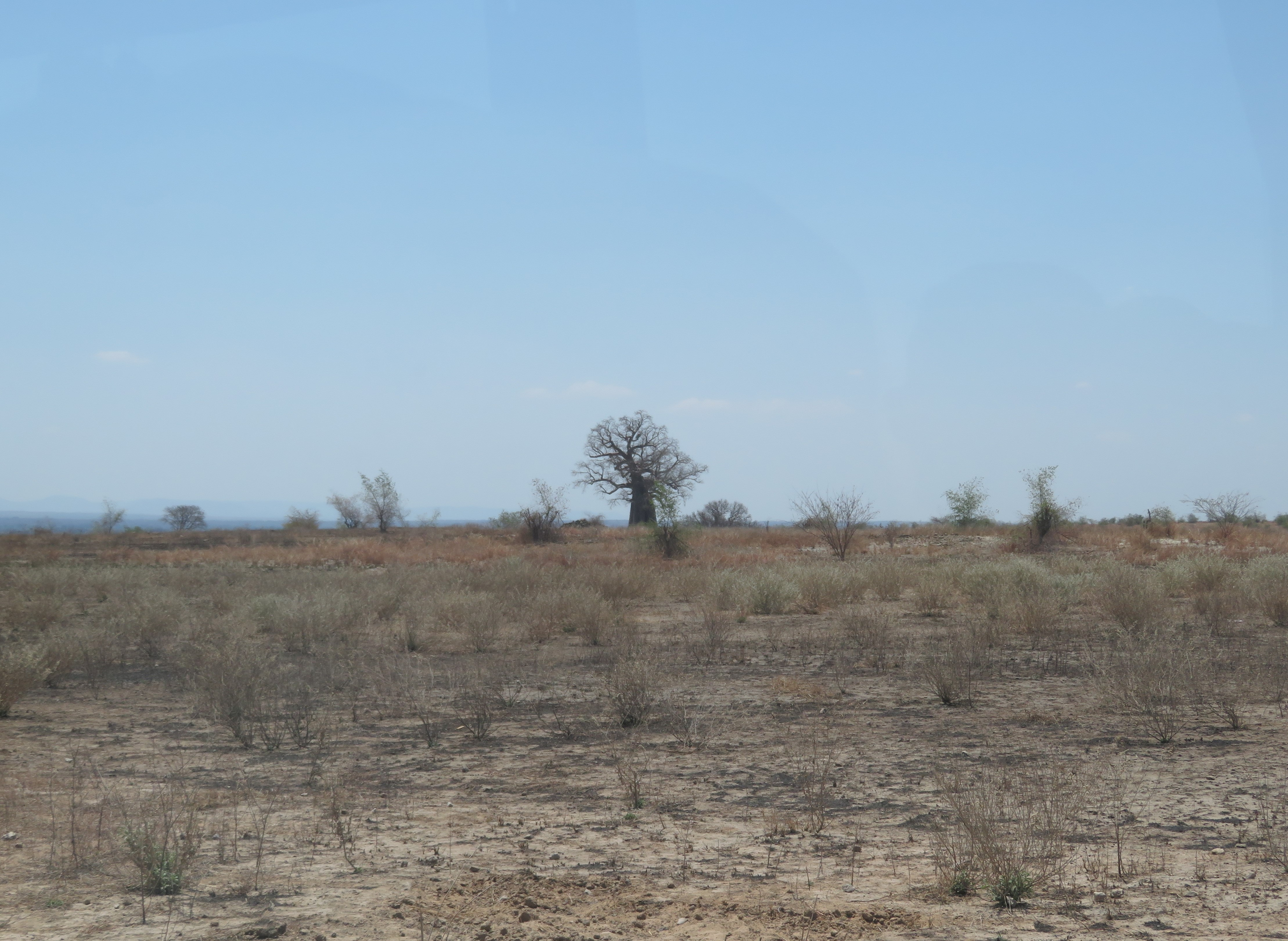
Landscape near Mahaboboka, Atsimo-Andrefana, in south-western Madagascar

== Partnerships ==
CI Madagascar's recurring partnerships have included Malagasy government institutions involved in corridor and protected-area management, international climate-finance institutions, and local community structures. In CAZ, the Malagasy government engaged Conservation International to manage the corridor, and a technical committee composed of governmental and non-governmental partners was established to guide the creation process, with Conservation International providing secretariat support. In eastern Madagascar more broadly, SLEM brought together the Green Climate Fund, Conservation International Foundation as accredited entity, and the European Investment Bank within the project's financing and safeguard framework.

At local level, recurring partner structures have included community-based forest groups in COFAV and community-based forestry organisations (VOI) in CAZ, as well as fishing communities involved in the establishment and governance of the Corridor Marin des 7 Baies marine protected area. Documented marine implementation partners for that corridor have included the Ministry of Environment and Sustainable Development, the Ministry of Fisheries and Blue Economy, decentralized territorial authorities, the fisheries surveillance centre, and research institutions. In south-western Madagascar, related rangeland-restoration work has also involved GIZ and local stakeholders.

== Funding and conservation finance ==
Protected-area finance in Madagascar has increasingly relied on the Madagascar Protected Areas and Biodiversity Fund (FAPBM), a trust fund created in 2005 to provide sustainable financing for protected areas. World Bank project planning for the fund envisaged initial seed money from WWF and Conservation International, and official FAPBM reporting states that it was created on the initiative of the Government of Madagascar, Conservation International and WWF. Later World Bank and FAPBM documentation described it as a major mechanism for sustainable financing of Madagascar's protected-area system. By 2019 the fund met about 28 percent of the financial needs of protected areas managed by Madagascar National Parks and 29 percent of those of non-MNP protected areas; in 2023 it funded 64 protected areas covering 5,283,481 hectares, and the strategic target of funding 70 protected areas was achieved in 2024.

Climate finance for eastern landscapes expanded through SLEM. The programme was designed as a blended finance model that paired grant-funded resilience and land-management activities with a plan to channel private finance into climate-smart investments in agriculture and renewable energy through a Green/Climate Bond, with investment returns intended for reinvestment in later climate activities in Madagascar. As implemented, GCF financing was reduced from US$18.5 million to US$15,199,555, with US$800,000 in co-financing.

Carbon finance in eastern Madagascar also developed through CAZ and the broader Atiala-Atsinanana emissions-reduction programme. The earlier CAZ carbon project aimed to purchase 430,000 tonnes of verified emission reductions from reduced deforestation, with revenues intended to help finance protected-area management and expand local economic opportunities. In the later Atiala-Atsinanana programme, project documents estimated payments of up to US$50 million for measured, reported and verified emission reductions. The associated benefit-sharing plan structured carbon benefits through utilization plans prepared by promoters in consultation with local communities and regional and national platforms; it allowed benefits to be delivered in cash or in kind and allocated 20 per cent to governance costs, 20 per cent to rewards and monitoring for communes and regional structures, and 60 per cent to field-level REDD+ activities.

== Impact and evaluation ==
Midterm evaluation of SLEM found widespread adoption of conservation agriculture practices, improvement in household food security measured through the Consolidated Approach for Reporting Indicators of Food Security (CARI), and a lower proportion of beneficiaries deriving income from unsustainable activities. Endline evaluation found reductions in deforestation, a shift toward year-round farming systems, and higher agricultural incomes driven by promoted crops. It also found improved food self-sufficiency and reduced reliance on some negative coping strategies, but no statistically significant change in the overall CARI index by the end of the evaluation period.

The same endline evaluation found that sustaining more complex conservation practices remained difficult, especially for female-headed households, and that longer-term resilience remained fragile despite some short-term gains in households' ability to cope with climate shocks. It concluded that income gains alone were not enough to secure lasting improvements in food security and adaptive capacity without complementary support.

Research on conservation and development investments in CAZ between 2007 and 2014 found statistically significant associations between the presence of investments and reduced deforestation in 2010 and 2011, together with reduced fire detections across the study area. It also found that larger and more sustained investments were associated with better outcomes, while noting that missing data on other investments, the absence of a clear baseline, and the volatility of the political and land-use context limited causal certainty.
