= Ankeniheny-Zahamena Corridor =

Area of protected forest biome in Madagascar

- IUCN category VI (protected area with sustainable use of natural resources)
- Location within Madagascar
- Location: Eastern Madagascar
- Nearest city: Moramanga, Alaotra-Mangoro
- Coordinates: 17.7°S 48.75°E
- Area: 3,810 km^{2} (1,470 sq mi)
- Established: 2007
- Governing body: MINENVEF

The Ankeniheny-Zahamena Corridor (CAZ) is a large area of protected forest biome in eastern Madagascar. The CAZ encompasses some 3,810 km^{2}, making it one of the largest areas of rainforest remaining in the country. Over 2,000 species of plants have been recorded in the CAZ, nearly 1,700 of which are endemic to the region.

This area is the main source of water in the eastern and western part of Madagascar.

It received the status of a natural resource reserve in 2015.

== Flora and fauna ==
The CAZ is an area of enormous biodiversity: fifteen species of lemur have been recorded in it, at least three of which (the indri, the black-and-white ruffed lemur, and the diademed sifaka) are known to be threatened.

Some 30 other mammal species, 129 amphibian species, and 89 avian species have been recorded in the CAZ.

== Conservation ==
Work in the Ankeniheny-Zahamena Corridor (CAZ) has included involvement by Conservation International Madagascar, including technical support to protected-area management and secretariat functions for a technical committee established for the protected area.

== See also ==
- National parks of Madagascar
