= Mandialaza =

- Location in Madagascar
- Coordinates: 18°37′S 48°2′E
- Country: Madagascar
- Region: Alaotra-Mangoro
- District: Moramanga
- Elevation: 900 m (3,000 ft)

Population (2018)
  - Total: 15,835
- Time zone: UTC3 (EAT)
- Postal code: 514

Mandialaza is a rural municipality in Madagascar. It belongs to the district of Moramanga, which is a part of Alaotra-Mangoro Region. The population of the municipality was 15835 in 2018.

Primary and junior level secondary education are available in town. The majority 93% of the population of the commune are farmers. The most important crop is rice, while other important products are bananas, beans and cassava. Services provide employment for 7% of the population.

== Rivers ==
The Mangoro River has its sources in Mandialaza, about 14km North-East of the village.
