= Anosibe Ifody =

- Location in Madagascar
- Coordinates: 18°55′S 48°3′E
- Country: Madagascar
- Region: Alaotra-Mangoro
- District: Moramanga
- Elevation: 1,062 m (3,484 ft)

Population (2001)
  - Total: 6,000
- Time zone: UTC3 (EAT)

Anosibe Ifody is a town and commune (Malagasy: kaominina) in Madagascar. It belongs to the district of Moramanga, which is a part of Alaotra-Mangoro Region. The population of the commune was estimated to be approximately 6,000 in 2001 commune census.

Primary and junior level secondary education are available in town. The majority 99% of the population of the commune are farmers. The most important crops are rice and bananas, while other important agricultural products are beans and cassava. Services provide employment for 1% of the population.
