= Moramanga Suburbaine =

Coordinates: 18.94°S 48.23°E

- Interactive map of Moramanga Suburbaine
- Country: Madagascar
- Region: Alaotra-Mangoro
- District: Moramanga

Population (2001)
  - Total: 17,000
- Time zone: UTC3 (EAT)

Moramanga Suburbaine is a town and commune (Malagasy: kaominina) in Madagascar. It belongs to the district of Moramanga, which is a part of Alaotra-Mangoro Region. The population of the commune was estimated to be approximately 17,000 in 2001 commune census.

Moramanga Suburbaine is served by a local airport. Primary and junior level secondary education are available in town. The majority 80% of the population of the commune are farmers. The most important crop is rice, while other important products are beans and cassava. Industry and services provide both employment for 10% of the population.
