= Ambohidronono =

- Location in Madagascar
- Coordinates: 18°45′S 48°2′E
- Country: Madagascar
- Region: Alaotra-Mangoro
- District: Moramanga

Area
  - Total: 205 km^{2} (79 sq mi)
- Elevation: 992 m (3,255 ft)

Population (2018)
  - Total: 13,206
- Time zone: UTC3 (EAT)
- Postal code: 514

Ambohidronono is a rural commune in Madagascar. It belongs to the district of Moramanga, which is a part of Alaotra-Mangoro Region. The population of the commune was 13,206 in 2018.

Primary and junior level secondary education are available in town. The majority 98% of the population of the commune are farmers. The most important crops are rice and beans, while other important agricultural products are bananas, maize and cassava. Services provide employment for 2% of the population.
