= Andasibe, Moramanga =

Andasibe
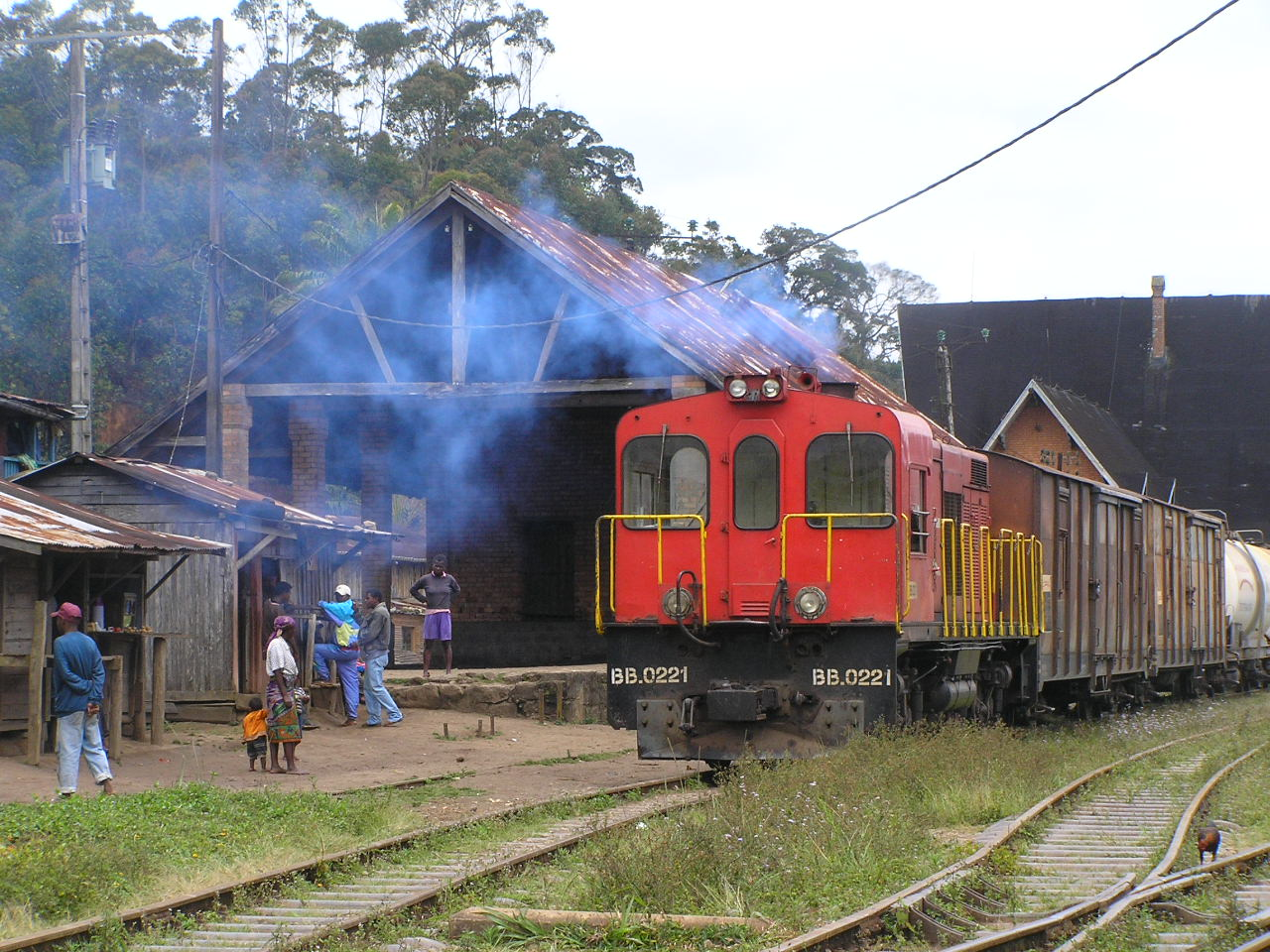
- Andasibe station
- Interactive map of Andasibe
- Coordinates: 18°56′S 48°25′E
- Country: Madagascar
- Region: Alaotra-Mangoro
- District: Moramanga

Area
  - Total: 363 km^{2} (140 sq mi)
- Elevation: 810–1,200 m (2,660–3,940 ft)

Population (2006)
  - Total: 13,493
- Time zone: UTC3 (EAT)

Andasibe (also Andasibe Gara) is a rural municipality in Madagascar. It belongs to the district of Moramanga, which is a part of Alaotra-Mangoro Region. In 2006, the commune's population was estimated at 13,493.

== Geography ==
The town lies along the RN 2 around 140 km from the capital Antananarivo, 26 km from Moramanga and 200 km from Toamasina. It has a disused railway station along the Antananarivo – East Coast line.

== Economy ==
The national parks within the commune bring many tourists to the area and offer job opportunities for local residents. It is also a site of industrial-scale mining. Sixty-percent of the commune's population is farmers. The most important crop is rice, while other important crops include corn, bananas and manioc. Industry and services combined provide employment for 20% of the population.

Primary and junior-level secondary education is available in town.

== Religion ==
- FJKM - Fiangonan'i Jesoa Kristy eto Madagasikara (Church of Jesus Christ in Madagascar)
- Roman Catholic Church

== Rivers ==
The town is crossed by the Sahatandra and Vohitra rivers.

== See also ==
- Analamazaotra National Park
- Andasibe-Mantadia National Park
- Railway stations in Madagascar
