= Fierenana, Moramanga =

Fierenana
- Location in Madagascar
- Coordinates: 18°29′S 48°24′E
- Country: Madagascar
- Region: Alaotra-Mangoro
- District: Moramanga
- Elevation: 946 m (3,104 ft)

Population (2001)
  - Total: 9,000
- Time zone: UTC3 (EAT)

Fierenana is a town and commune (Malagasy: kaominina) in Madagascar. It belongs to the district of Moramanga, which is a part of Alaotra-Mangoro Region. The population of the commune was estimated to be approximately 9,000 in 2001 commune census.

Primary and junior level secondary education are available in town. The majority 98% of the population of the commune are farmers. The most important crop is rice, while other important products are coffee, beans and cassava. Services provide employment for 2% of the population.
