= Antanandava, Moramanga =

Antanandava
- Location in Madagascar
- Coordinates: 19°5′S 47°57′E
- Country: Madagascar
- Region: Alaotra-Mangoro
- District: Moramanga
- Elevation: 1,064 m (3,491 ft)

Population (2018)
  - Total: 12,755
- Time zone: UTC3 (EAT)
- Postal code: 514

Antanandava is a rural commune in Madagascar. It belongs to the district of Moramanga, which is a part of Alaotra-Mangoro Region. The population of the commune was 12,755 in 2018.

Primary and junior level secondary education are available in town. The majority 99% of the population of the commune are farmers. The most important crops are rice and beans, while other important agricultural products are sugarcane and bambara groundnut. Services provide employment for 1% of the population.
