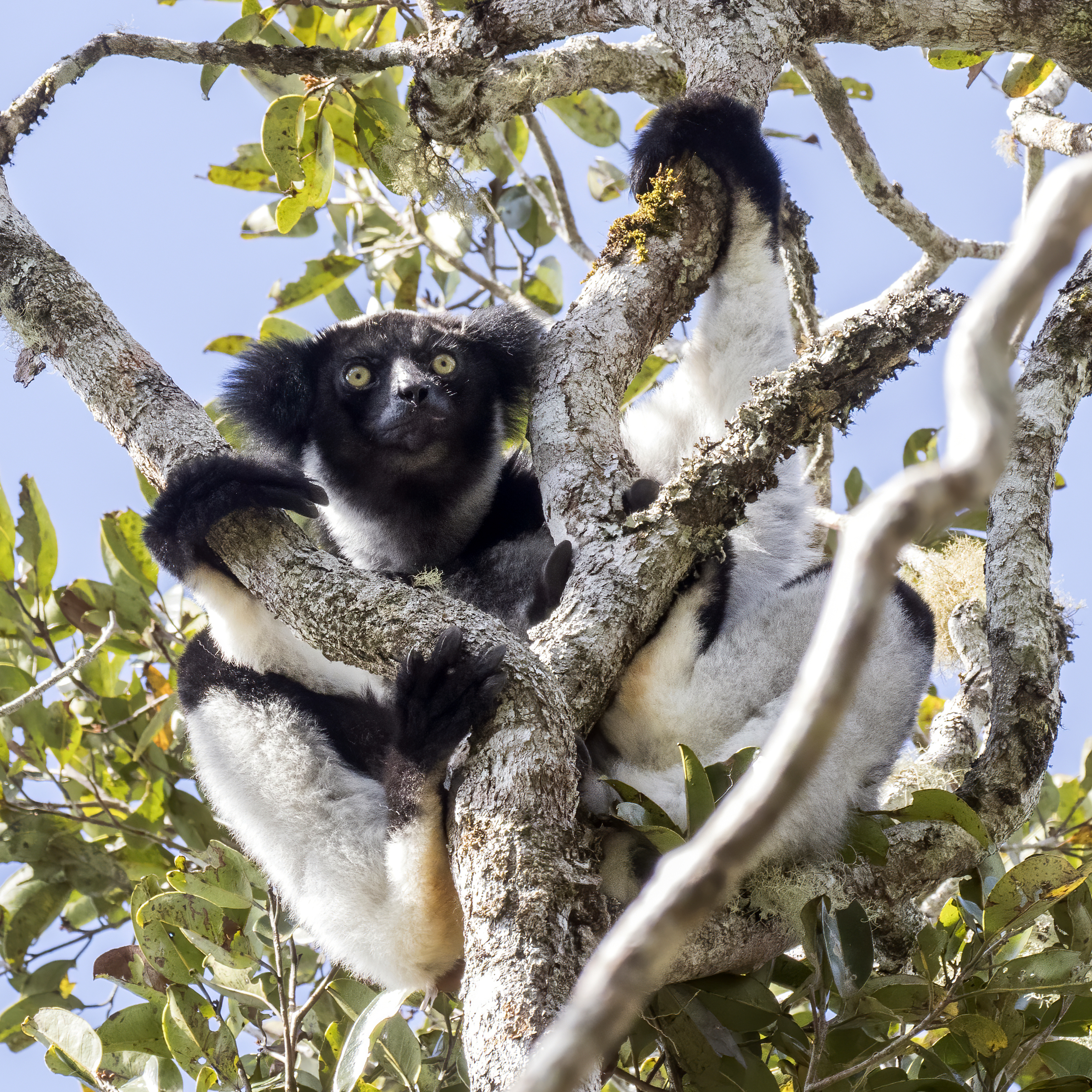
- In Analamazaotra Special Reserve

Conservation status
- Critically Endangered (IUCN 3.1)
- CITES Appendix I

Scientific classification
- Kingdom: Animalia
- Phylum: Chordata
- Class: Mammalia
- Order: Primates
- Suborder: Strepsirrhini
- Family: Indriidae
- Genus: Indri; É. Geoffroy, 1796
- Species: I. indri

Binomial name
- Indri indri (Gmelin, 1788)
- Distribution of I. indri

Synonyms
- Genus: Indris Cuvier, 1800; Lichanotus Illiger, 1811; Indrium Rafinesque, 1815; Lichanotes Temminck, 1827; Pithelemur Lesson, 1840; Species: Lemur indri Gmelin, 1788; Indri brevicaudatus E. Geoffroy and G. Cuvier, 1796; Indri niger Lacépède, 1799; Indris ater I. Geoffroy, 1825; Lichanotus mitratus Peters, 1871; Indris variegatus Gray, 1872

= Indri =

Genus of lemurs

The indri (/ˈɪndri/; Indri indri), also called the babakoto, is one of the largest living lemurs, with a head-body length of about 64–72 cm (25–28 1/2 in) and a weight of between 6 and 9.5 kg (13 and 21 lb). It has a black and white coat and maintains an upright posture when climbing or clinging. It is monogamous and lives in small family groups, moving through the canopy, and is herbivorous, feeding mainly on leaves but also seeds, fruits, and flowers. The groups are quite vocal, communicating with other groups by singing, roaring and other vocalisations.

It is a diurnal tree-dweller related to the sifakas and, like all lemurs, it is native to Madagascar. It is revered by the Malagasy people and plays an important part in their myths and legends with various stories in existence accounting for its origin. The main threats faced by the indri are habitat destruction and fragmentation due to slash and burn agriculture, fuelwood gathering, and logging. It is also hunted despite taboos against this. The International Union for Conservation of Nature has rated its conservation status as "critically endangered".

== Etymology ==
The name "indri" most likely comes from a native Malagasy name for the animal, endrina. An oft-repeated, but incorrect story is that the name comes from indry [ˈiɳɖʐʲ], meaning "there" or "there it is". French naturalist Pierre Sonnerat, who first described the animal, supposedly heard a Malagasy point out the animal and took the word to be its name. It has been suggested that he may have heard the local name endrina which is used. Another Malagasy name for the animal is babakoto [bəbəˈkut]. Babakoto is most commonly translated as "ancestor" or "father", but several translations are possible. "Koto" is a Malagasy word for "little boy" and "Rakoto" is a common name, with "Koto" as its diminutive. As "baba" is a term for "father," the word "babakoto" may be translated as "father of a little boy" or "father of Rakoto." The father-son dynamic of many of the babakoto origin myths helps to explain the Malagasy name.

== Physical characteristics ==
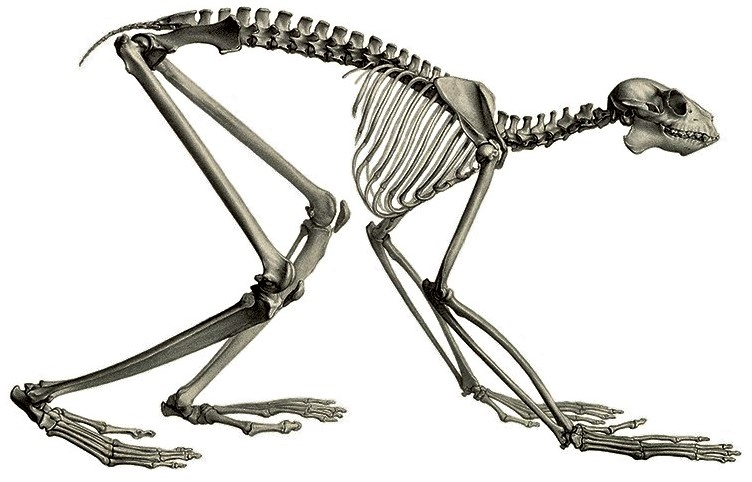
Skeleton

Along with the diademed sifaka, the indri is the largest lemur still in existence; both have average weights of about 6.5 kg. It can weigh up to 9.0 kg (19 3/4 lb) to 9.5 kg (21 lb) and perhaps up to 15 kg (33 lb). It has a head-body length of 64–72 cm (2 ft 1 in – 2 ft 4 1/2 in) and can reach nearly 120 cm (4 ft) with legs fully extended.

The indri is a vertical clinger and leaper and thus holds its body upright when traveling through trees or resting in branches. It has long, muscular legs which it uses to propel itself from trunk to trunk. Its large greenish eyes and black face are framed by round, fuzzy ears. Unlike any other living lemur, the indri has only a rudimentary tail. The silky fur is mostly black with white patches along the limbs, neck, crown, and lower back. Different populations of the species show wide variations in color, with some northern populations consisting of mostly or entirely black individuals. The face is bare with pale black skin, and it is sometimes fringed with white fur.

Due to these color variations, Colin Groves listed two subspecies of the indri in 2005: The dark Indri indri indri from the northern part of its range and the relatively pale Indri indri variegatus from the southern part. Later editions of Lemurs of Madagascar by Russell Mittermeier et al. do not recognize this classification, and recent genetic and morphological work suggests the variation in the indri is clinal.

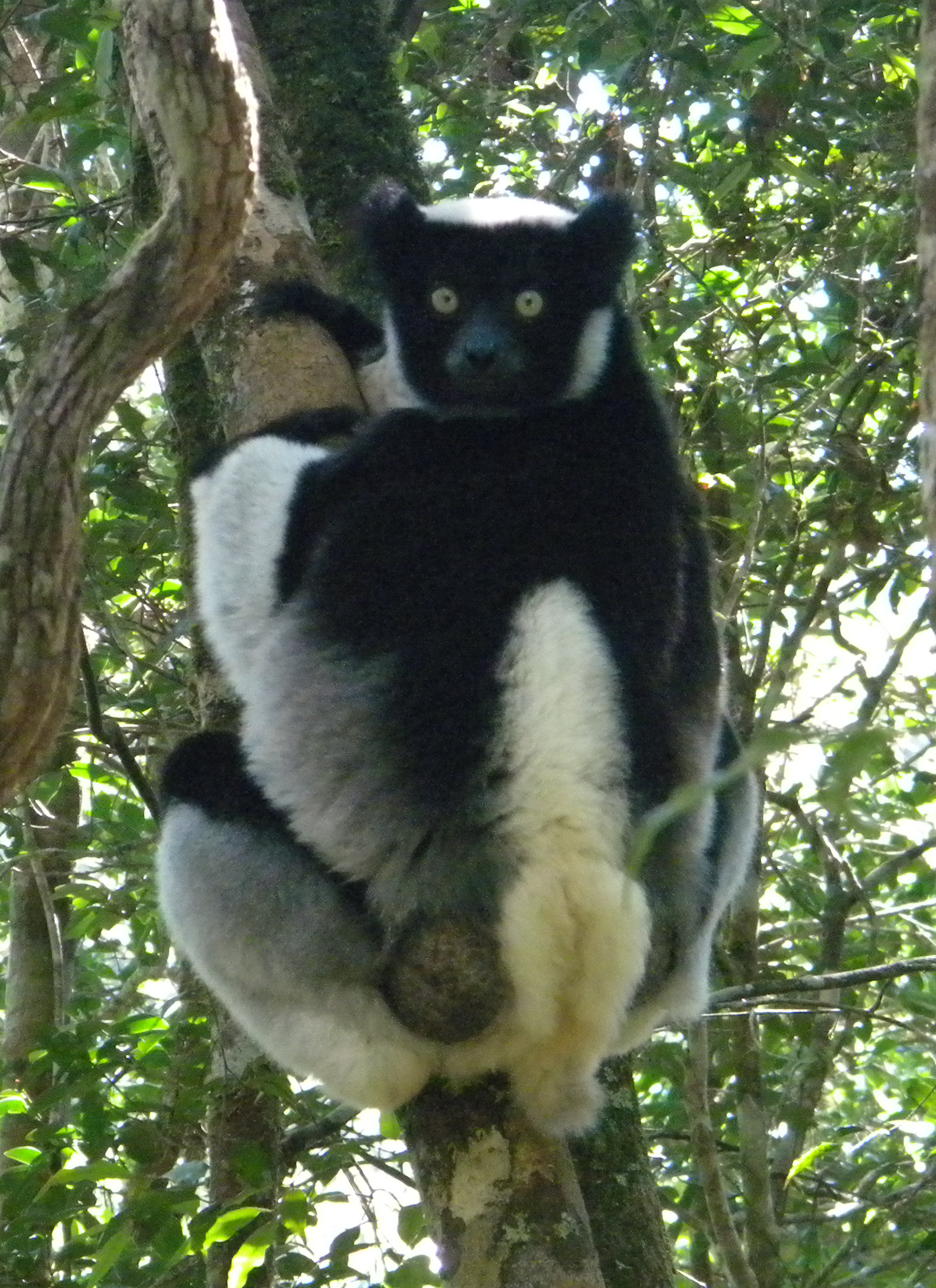

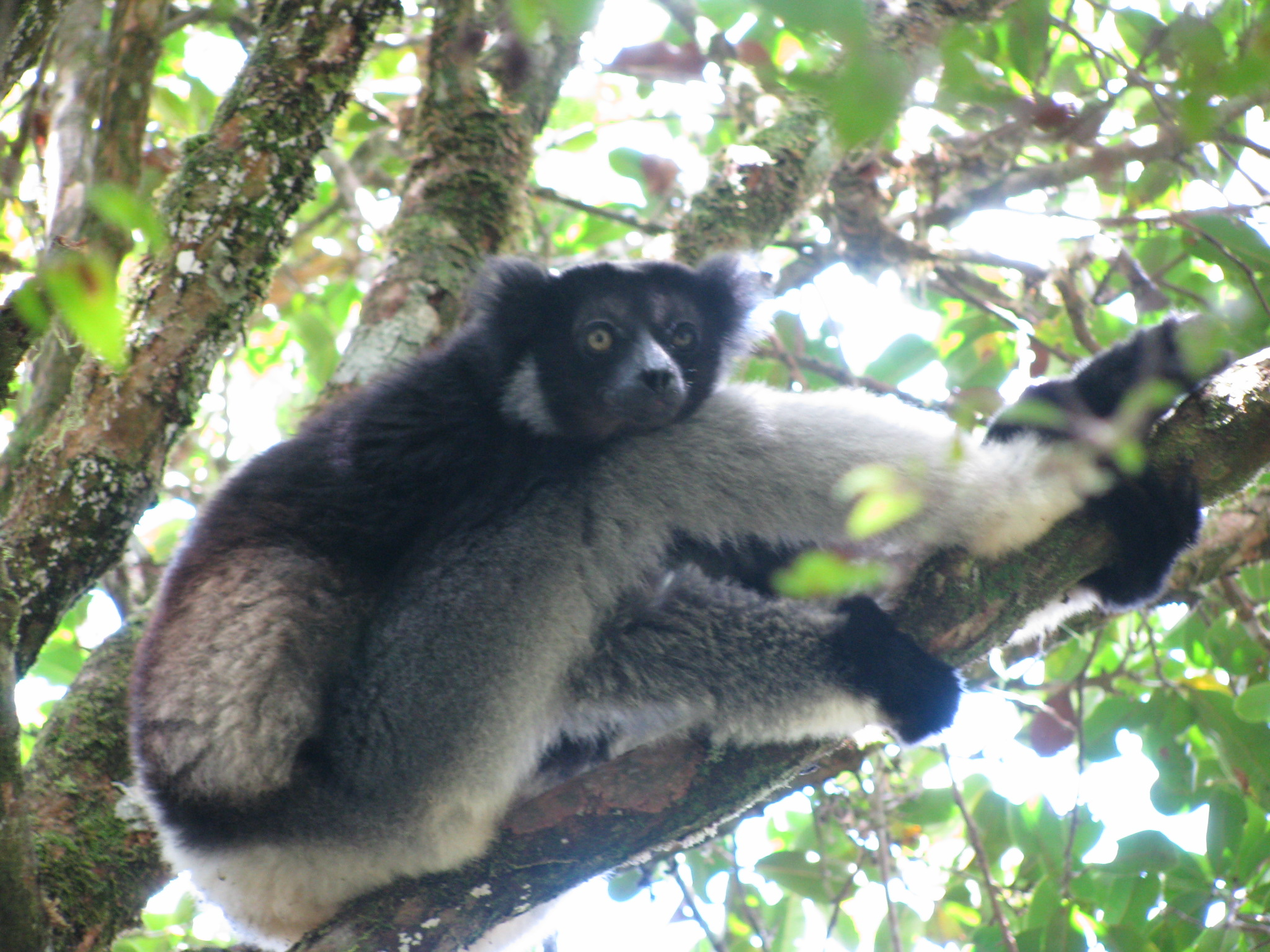
In Andasibe-Mantadia National Park

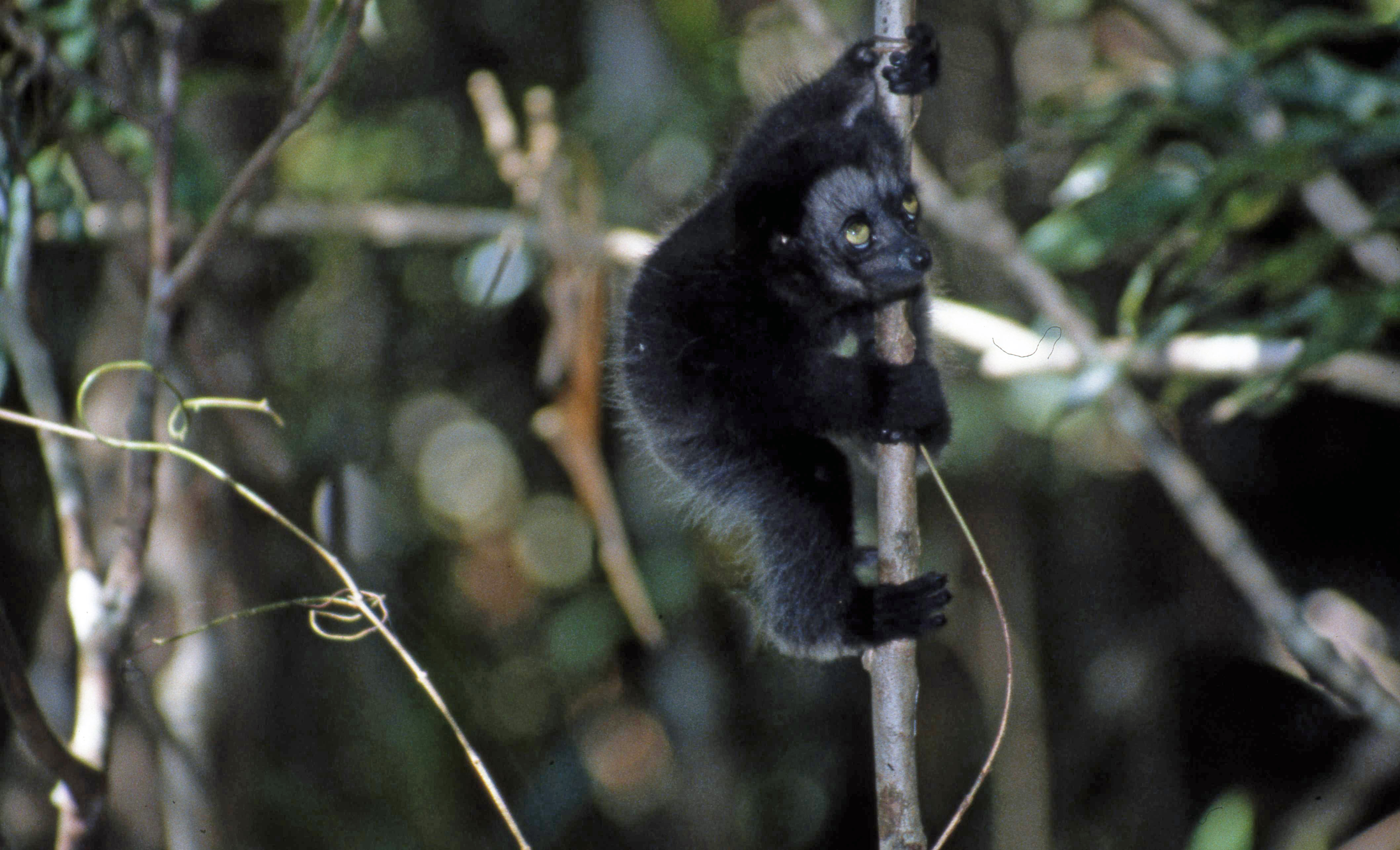
Juvenile

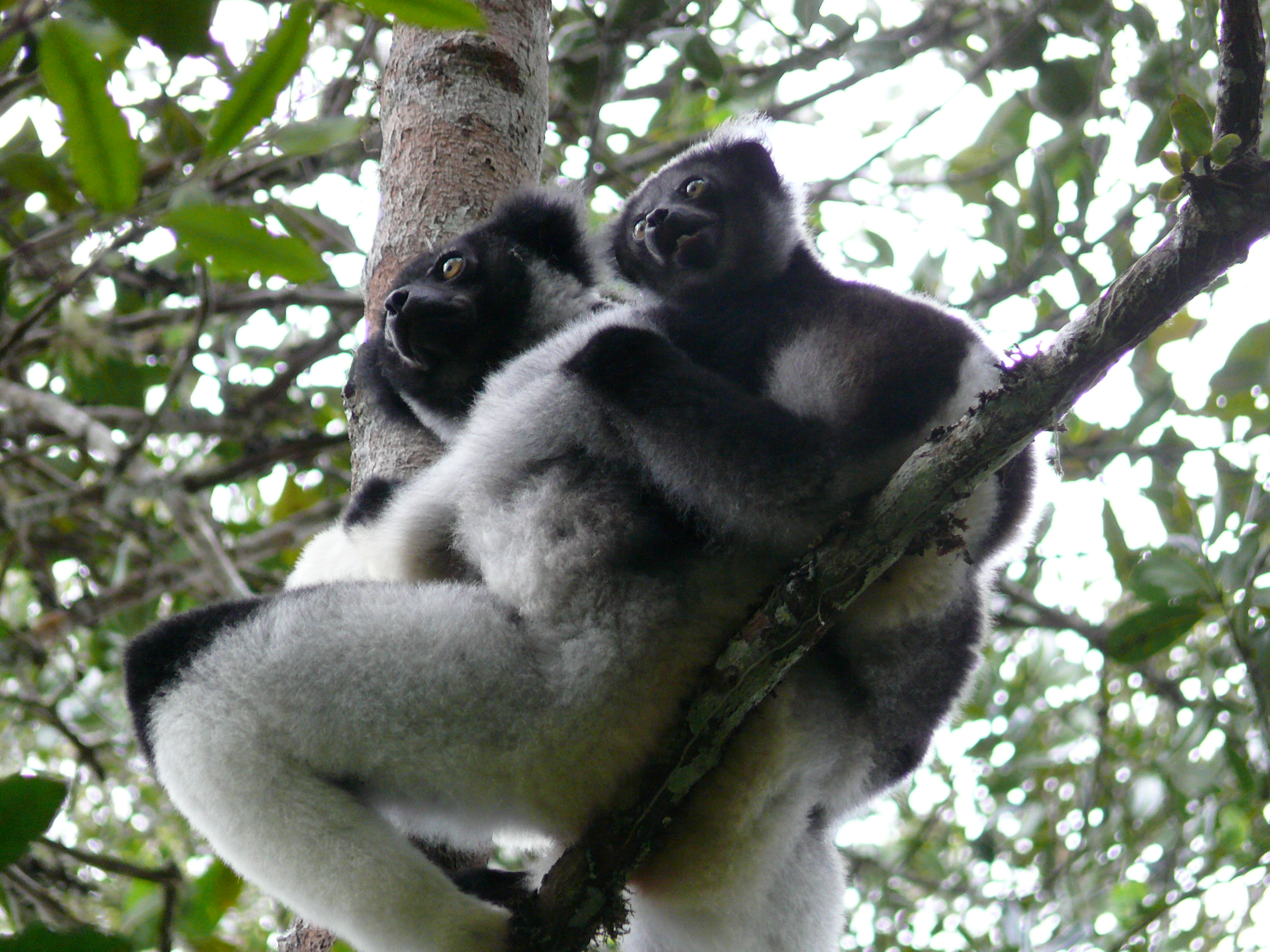
Adult with juvenile

== Behavior ==
The indri practices long-term monogamy, seeking a new partner only after the death of a mate. It lives in small groups consisting of the mated male and female and their maturing offspring. In the more fragmented forests of their range, the indri may live in larger groups with several generations. Habitat fragmentation limits the mobility and capacity of these large groups to break into smaller units.

Like many other species of lemur, indri live in a female dominant society. The dominant female often will displace males to lower branches and poorer feeding grounds, and is typically the one to lead the group during travel.

It is common for groups to move 300–700 m daily, with most distance travelled midsummer in search of fruit. Indris sleep in trees about 10–30 m above ground and typically sleep alone or in pairs. It is common for young female indris, occasionally adult females, to silently play wrestle anywhere from a few seconds up to 15 minutes. Members of a single group will urinate and defecate jointly at one of their many selected areas of defecation in their territory.

=== Reproduction ===
Indris reach sexual maturity between the ages of 7 and 9. Females bear offspring every two to three years, with a gestation period around 120–150 days. The single infant is usually born in May or June. The mother is the primary caregiver, though the father assists, remaining with his mate and offspring. Infants are born mostly or completely black and begin to show white coloration (if any) between four and six months of age. The infant clings to its mother's belly until it is four or five months old, at which time it is ready to move onto her back. The indri begins to demonstrate independence at eight months, but it will not be fully independent from its mother until it is at least two years old.

=== Communication ===
Indri duet
The wailing "song" of the Indri

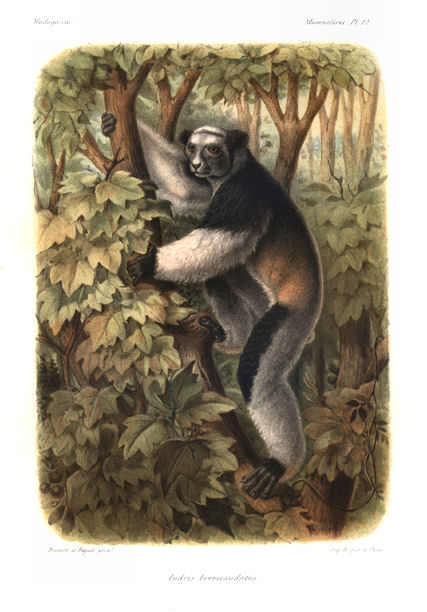
Drawing by Alfred Grandidier

The indri makes loud, distinctive songs, which can last from 45 seconds to more than 3 minutes. Song duration and structure varies among and even within groups, but most songs have the following three-phase pattern.

Usually, a roaring sequence lasting for several seconds will precede the more characteristic vocalizations. All members of the group except the very young participate in this roar, but the song proper is dominated by the adult pair. They follow the roar with a long note sequence, characterized by notes of up to five seconds in duration. After this is a descending phrase sequence. The wails begin on a high note and become progressively lower-pitched. It is common for two or more indri to coordinate the timing of their descending notes to form a duet.

Different indri groups typically sing sequentially, responding to one another. As well as solidifying contacts between groups, the songs may communicate territorial defense and boundaries, environmental conditions, reproductive potential of the group members, and warning signals. The indri may sing after disturbances such as thunder, airplanes, bird calls, and other lemur calls. A group will sing almost every day, up to seven times daily. The peak singing hours are between 7 and 11 am. Daily frequency of song is highest during the indri's breeding season from December to March.

Several other indri vocalizations have been identified. The "roar" is also used as a warning signal for aerial predators such as hawks. The indri emit a "hoot" or "honk" to warn of terrestrial predators such as the fossa. Other vocal categories include the "grunt", "kiss", "wheeze", and "hum". The purpose of these is not well understood.

Before singing, the indri move to the tree tops, which allows them to be heard up to 4 km away.

=== Diet and feeding ===
The indri is herbivorous and primarily folivorous. It prefers young, tender leaves, but will also eat seeds, fruits, and flowers. Female indri seem to have greater preference for immature leaves than males do and spend more time foraging among them. A wide variety of plant species are consumed, with members of the laurel family featuring prominently in the diet. The indri consumes little nontree vegetation.

To feed, the indri plucks off a leaf or other plant part with its teeth. It uses its hands to pull tree branches closer to its mouth.

Reproductively mature females have priority access to food sources, therefore they forage higher in the trees than males.

== Distribution ==
This lemur inhabits the lowland and montane forests along the eastern coast of Madagascar, from the Réserve Spéciale d'Anjanaharibe-Sud in the north to the Mangoro River in the south. They are absent from the Masoala Peninsula and the Marojejy National Park, even though both regions are connected to forests where indri do occur less than 40 km away.

== Relationship with humans ==
=== Mythology ===
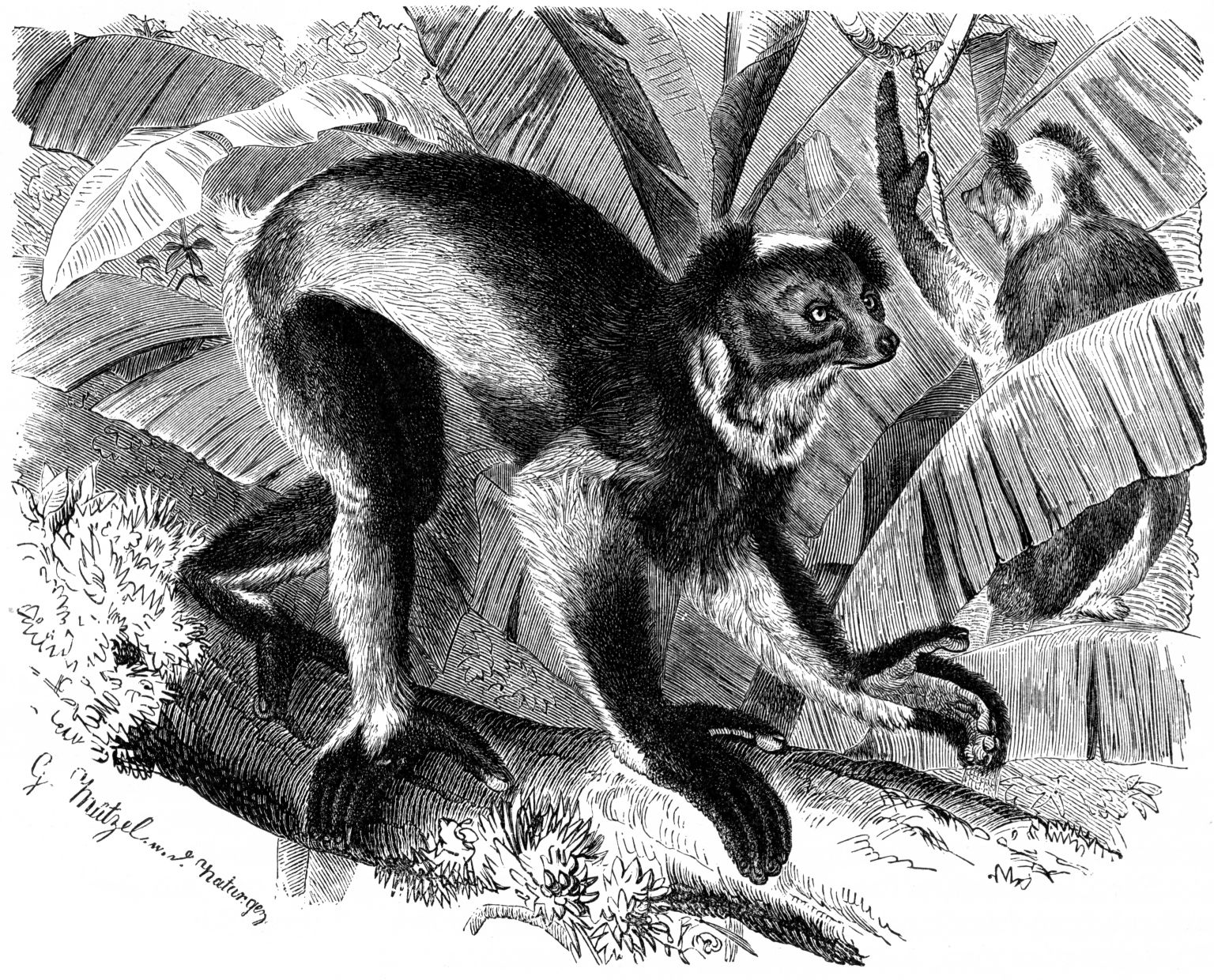
A lithograph of "Indris indris," (Brehms Tierleben)

Across Madagascar, the indri is revered and protected by fady (taboos). Countless variations are given on the legend of the indri's origins, but they all treat it as a sacred animal, not to be hunted or harmed.

A legend tells of a man who went hunting in the forest and did not return. His absence worried his son, who went out looking for him. When the son also disappeared, the rest of the villagers ventured into the forest seeking the two, but discovered only two large lemurs sitting in the trees: the first indri. The boy and his father had transformed. In some versions, only the son transforms, and the wailing of the babakoto is analogous to the father's wailing for his lost son.

Another human-like characteristic of the indri is its behavior in the sun. Like its sifaka relatives, the indri frequently engages in what has been described as sun-bathing or sun-worshipping. As the sun rises each morning, it will sit and face it from a tree branch with its legs crossed, back straight, hands low with palms facing out or resting on its knees, and eyes half-closed. Biologists are hesitant to call this behavior sun worship, as the term may be overly anthropomorphic. However, many Malagasy people do believe that the indri worships the sun.

=== Conservation ===
The first film of indri was obtained using tape lures, on an expedition forming the basis of David Attenborough's 1961 BBC series Zoo Quest to Madagascar.

The indri is a critically endangered species. While population estimates are uncertain (1,000 – 10 000 individuals), the population appears to be rapidly shrinking and may diminish by 80% over the next three generations (~36 years). The primary threats to its existence are habitat destruction and fragmentation due to slash and burn agriculture, fuelwood gathering, and logging. This kind of destruction occurs even in protected areas.

The indri is also widely hunted, despite the many origin myths and traditional taboos (fady) that hold it sacred. Cultural erosion and immigration are partly to blame for the breakdown of traditional beliefs. In some cases, Malagasy people who resent the protective fady find ways to circumvent them. People whose fady forbid them from eating the indri may still hunt the lemurs and sell their flesh, and those forbidden to kill the indri may still purchase and consume them. Indri meat is prized as a delicacy in some regions.

Only one indri has lived over a year in captivity and none have bred successfully while captive.
