= Sahatandra =

River in Madagascar

Coordinates: 18°56′S 48°25′E

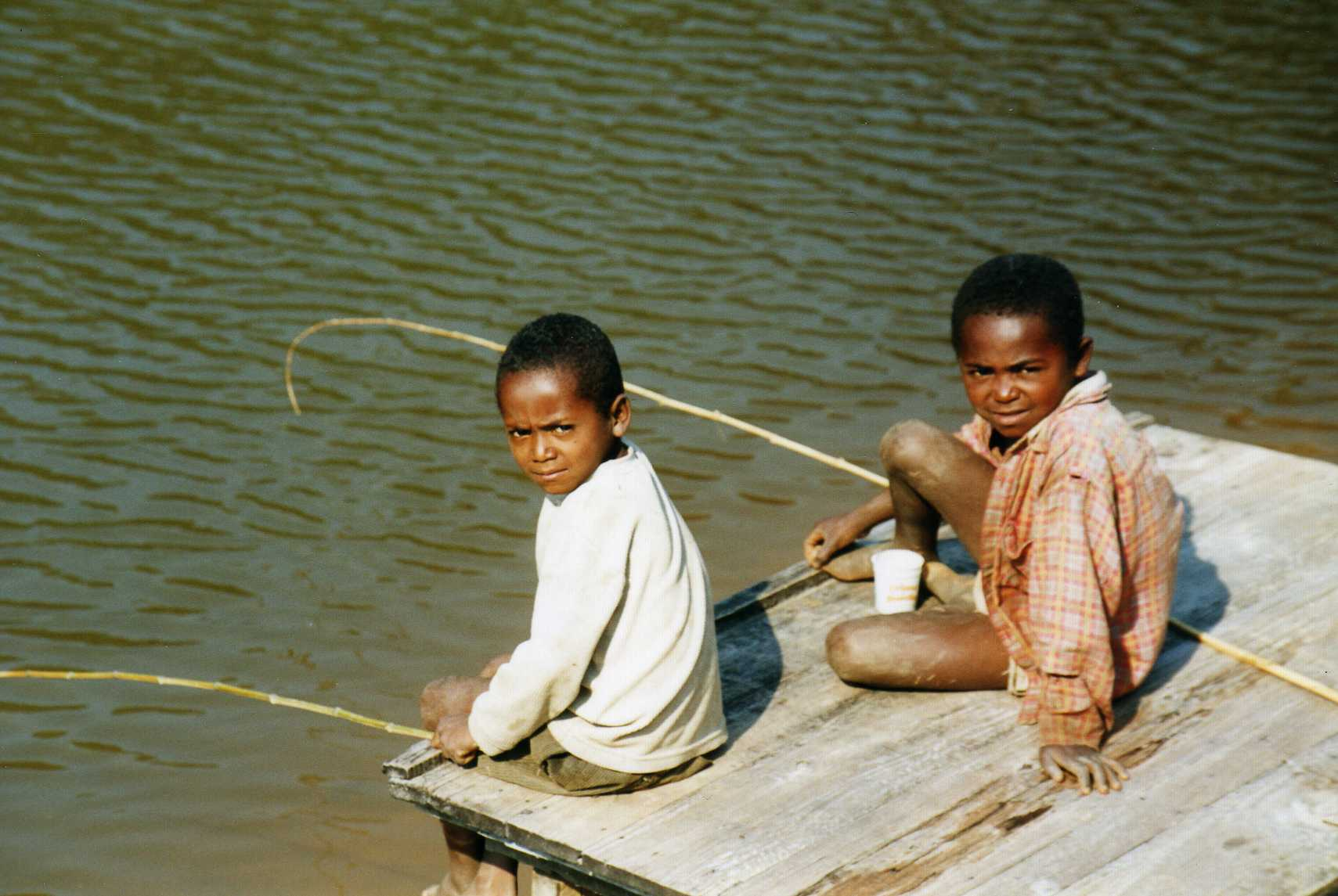
Young fishermen at Sahatandra river

The Sahatandra is a small river that flows through Andasibe in the Alaotra-Mangoro Region of Madagascar and the Andasibe-Mantadia National Park.

Its mouth is in the Vohitra river in Andasibe.
