= Vodiriana =

- Location in Madagascar
- Coordinates: 19°10′S 48°34′E
- Country: Madagascar
- Region: Alaotra-Mangoro
- District: Moramanga
- Elevation: 569 m (1,867 ft)

Population (2001)
  - Total: 10,000
- Time zone: UTC3 (EAT)

Vodiriana is a town and commune (Malagasy: kaominina) in Madagascar. It belongs to the district of Moramanga, which is a part of Alaotra-Mangoro Region. The population of the commune was estimated to be approximately 10,000 in 2001 commune census.

Primary and junior level secondary education are available in town. The majority 99.5% of the population of the commune are farmers. The most important crops are rice and cassava, while other important agricultural products are pineapple and beans. Services provide employment for 0.5% of the population.
