= Ampasipotsy Mandialaza =

Coordinates: 18.9667°S 48.34°E

Ampasipotsy Mandialiaza Antsoromisy
- Interactive map of Ampasipotsy Mandialiaza
- Madagascar: Madagascar
- Region: Alaotra-Mangoro
- District: Moramanga
- Established: December 1996

Government

Population (2018)
  - Total: 8,823
- Time zone: UTC3 (EAT)
- Postal code: 314

Ampasipotsy Mandialaza (or simply Ampasipotsy) is a village and municipality (Malagasy: kaominina) in Madagascar. It belongs to the district of Moramanga, which is a part of Alaotra-Mangoro Region. The population of the commune is 8823 in 2018.

Primary schooling and secondary are available. The majority 88% of the population of this municipality are farmers and others work for the well known group Fanalamanga. The most important crop is rice, while other important products are beans and cassava. Services provide employment for 80% of the population.
