= Belavabary =

- Location in Madagascar
- Coordinates: 18°50′S 48°0′E
- Country: Madagascar
- Region: Alaotra-Mangoro
- District: Moramanga
- Elevation: 945 m (3,100 ft)

Population (2001)
  - Total: 10,000
- Time zone: UTC3 (EAT)

Belavabary is a town and commune (Malagasy: kaominina) in Madagascar. It belongs to the district of Moramanga, which is a part of Alaotra-Mangoro Region. The population of the commune was estimated to be approximately 10,000 in 2001 commune census.

Primary and junior level secondary education are available in town. The majority 95% of the population of the commune are farmers. The most important crop is rice, while other important products are ginger, beans and cassava. Industry and services provide employment for 2% and 3% of the population, respectively.
