= Sambaina =

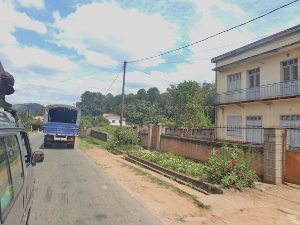
- Sambaina

- Location in Madagascar
- Coordinates: 18°54′S 47°47′E
- Country: Madagascar
- Region: Analamanga
- District: Manjakandriana
- Elevation: 1,426 m (4,678 ft)

Population (2018)
  - Total: 7,861
- Time zone: UTC3 (EAT)

Sambaina is the name of several towns and communes in Madagascar. Sambaina (Manjakandriana) belongs to the district of Manjakandriana, which is a part of Analamanga Region. The population of the commune was estimated to be approximately 7,831 in 2018.

Primary and junior level secondary education are available in town. The majority, 85%, of the population of the commune are farmers. The most important crops are cassava and potatoes, while other important agricultural products are beans and rice. Services provide employment for 15% of the population.
