= Lakato =

- Location in Madagascar
- Coordinates: 19°11′S 48°26′E
- Country: Madagascar
- Region: Alaotra-Mangoro
- District: Moramanga
- Elevation: 672 m (2,205 ft)

Population (2018)
  - Total: 21,609
- Time zone: UTC3 (EAT)
- Postal code: 514

Lakato is a rural commune in Madagascar. It belongs to the district of Moramanga, which is a part of Alaotra-Mangoro Region. The population of the commune was 21,609 in 2018.

Primary and junior level secondary education are available in town. The majority 85% of the population of the commune are farmers. The most important crop is rice, while other important products are bananas and coffee. Services provide employment for 15% of the population.
