= Beforona =

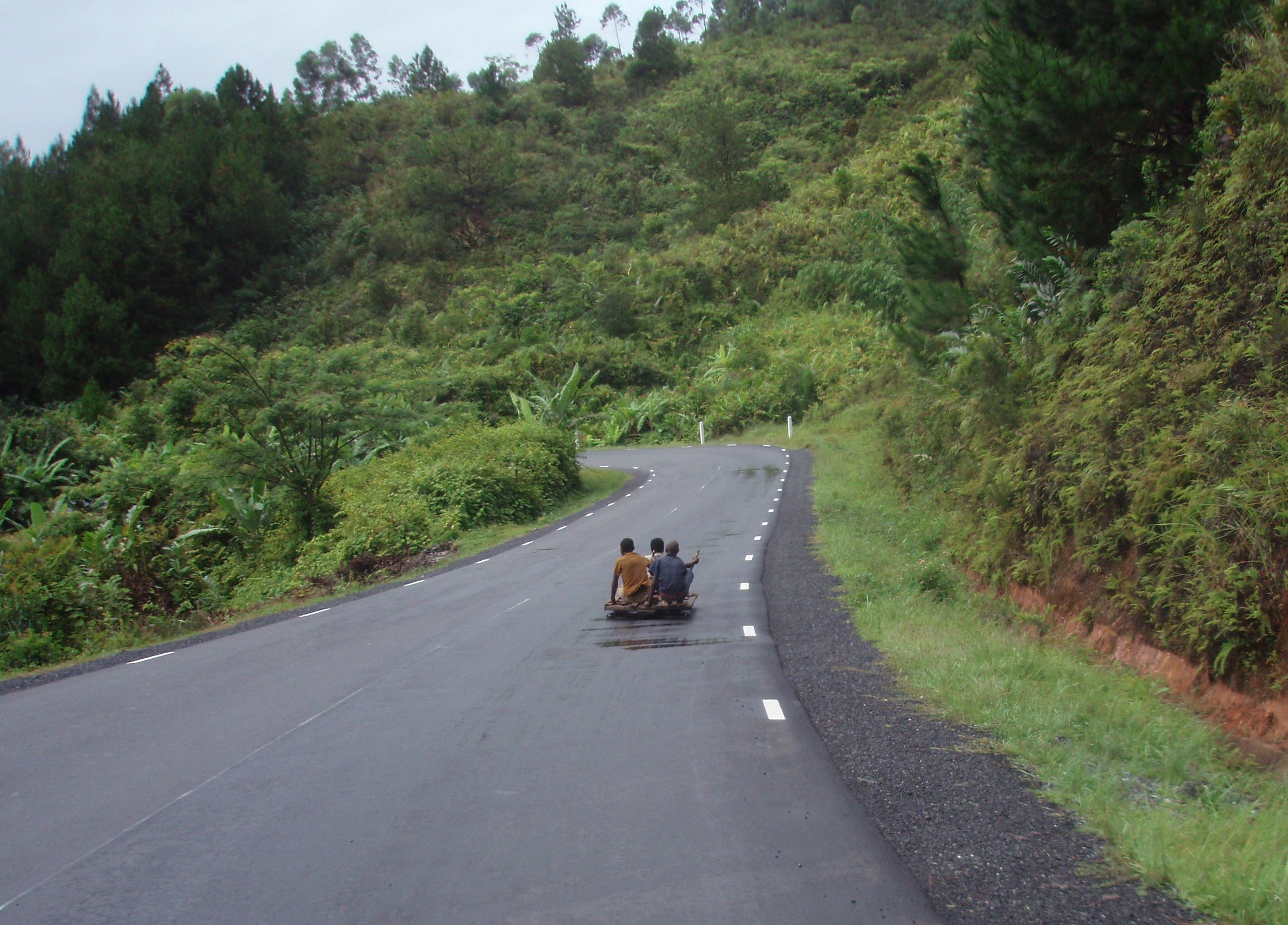
- Route nationale 2 near Beforona

- Location in Madagascar
- Coordinates: 18°58′S 48°35′E
- Country: Madagascar
- Region: Alaotra-Mangoro
- District: Moramanga
- Elevation: 549 m (1,801 ft)

Population (2018)
  - Total: 20,380
- Time zone: UTC3 (EAT)
- Postal code: 514

Beforona is a town and commune (Malagasy: kaominina) in Madagascar. It belongs to the district of Moramanga, which is a part of Alaotra-Mangoro Region. The population of the commune was estimated to be approximately 20,380 in 2018.

It is situated at the RN 2 from Antananarivo to Toamasina, or about 49 km from Moramanga.

Primary and junior level secondary education are available in town. The majority of the population of the commune are farmers. The most important crop is rice, while other important products are bananas, coffee and Ginger. Services provide employment for 1% of the population.
