= Rakoto =

<<Rakoto>> is a Malagasy surname widespread in the territories of the former <<Merina Kingdom>> (high central lands), especially within the <<Merina elites>>. He often refers to the <<Malagasy Nobility>> (<<Andriana>>) or free commoners (<<Hova>>). The prefix Rakoto- is frequently placed at the beginning of the name and can designate the social status or nobility of the family bearing this prefix.

== Given name ==
- Rakoto Frah (1923–2001), Malagasy musician
- William René Rakoto Mahefarinoro, Malagasy politician

== Surname ==
- José Rakoto (born 1980), Malagasy rugby union player
- Prince Rakotosehenondradama (Radama II) (1829–1863), Malagasy monarch
