= Beparasy =

Mangarivotra Beparasy
- Location in Madagascar
- Coordinates: 19°10′S 48°2′E
- Country: Madagascar
- Region: Alaotra-Mangoro
- District: Moramanga
- Established: 2015
- Elevation: 914 m (2,999 ft)

Population (2001)
  - Total: 9,000
- Time zone: UTC3 (EAT)
- Postal code: 514

Mangarivotra (formerly named: Beparasy) is a rural municipality in Madagascar. It belongs to the district of Moramanga, which is a part of the Alaotra-Mangoro Region. The population of the commune was estimated to be approximately 9,000 in the 2001 commune census.

The town has both primary and junior level secondary schools. 95% of the working-age population of the commune are farmers. The most important crop is rice, while other important products are beans and cassava. Services provide employment for 5% of the population.

== Annual Festival ==
Since 2012, Madagasikara Voakajy has organised an annual festival to celebrate the efforts made by local Malagasy communities to protect the forest from the devastation of environmental degradation and threats such as slash-and burn agriculture and illegal gold mining.

== Renaming ==
This municipality was formerly called Beparasy but was renamed in 2015.
