= Mitsino =

Mitsino Мицино
- Village
- Location within Vladimir Oblast Location within Russia
- Coordinates: 56°19′N 41°34′E
- Country: Russia
- Region: Vladimir Oblast
- District: Kovrovsky District
- Time zone: UTC+3:00

Mitsino (Russian: Мицино) is a rural locality (a village) in Klyazminskoye Rural Settlement, Kovrovsky District, Vladimir Oblast, Russia. The population was 16 as of 2010.

== Geography ==
Mitsino is located 23 km southeast of Kovrov (the district's administrative centre) by road. Moshachikha is the nearest rural locality.
