= William René Rakoto Mahefarinoro =

Malagasy politician

William René Rakoto Mahefarinoro is a Malagasy school teacher and politician. A member of the National Assembly of Madagascar, he was elected as a member of the Tiako I Madagasikara party; he represents the third constituency of Antananarivo in the 2007 Malagasy parliamentary elections with 60,65% of the votes.

He is the director of the lycée Faravohitra.
