= Manjakandriana =

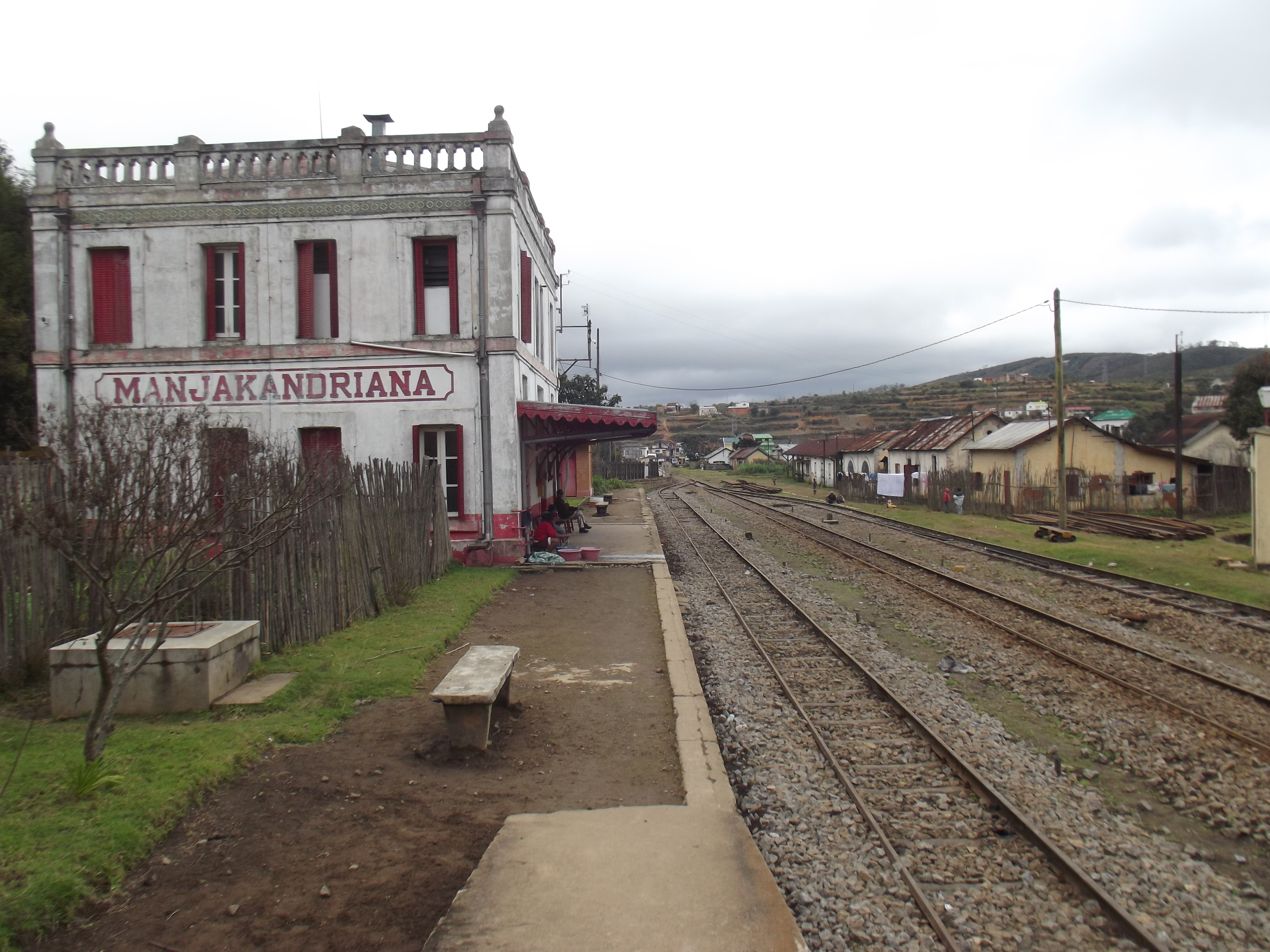
- Railway station of Manjakandriana

- Location in Madagascar
- Coordinates: 18°33′S 47°28′E
- Country: Madagascar
- Region: Analamanga
- District: Manjakandriana

Government
  - Mayor: Fitia Fenohery Rakotondrahiratra

Area
  - Total: 120 km^{2} (46 sq mi)
- Elevation: 1,450 m (4,760 ft)

Population (2018)
  - Total: 22,188
- Time zone: UTC3 (EAT)
- postal code: 116

Manjakandriana is a town and commune in Manjakandriana District, Analamanga Region, in the Central Highlands of Madagascar. It is located 47 km east of Antananarivo on the Route Nationale RN2 and the railway line from Antananarivo - Toamasina.

== Economy ==
The economy is based on agriculture. Rice, maize, peanuts, beans, manioc are the main crops.

== Local attractions ==
The Peyrieras Reptile Reserve (a butterfly farm and reptile center) is at Marozevo, 20 km (12 mi) east of Manjakandriana on the Route Nationale RN2.
