= Route nationale 2 (Madagascar) =

Road in Madagascar

Major junctions
- from end: Antananarivo
- to Toamasina

Location
- Country: Madagascar

Highway system
- Roads in Madagascar

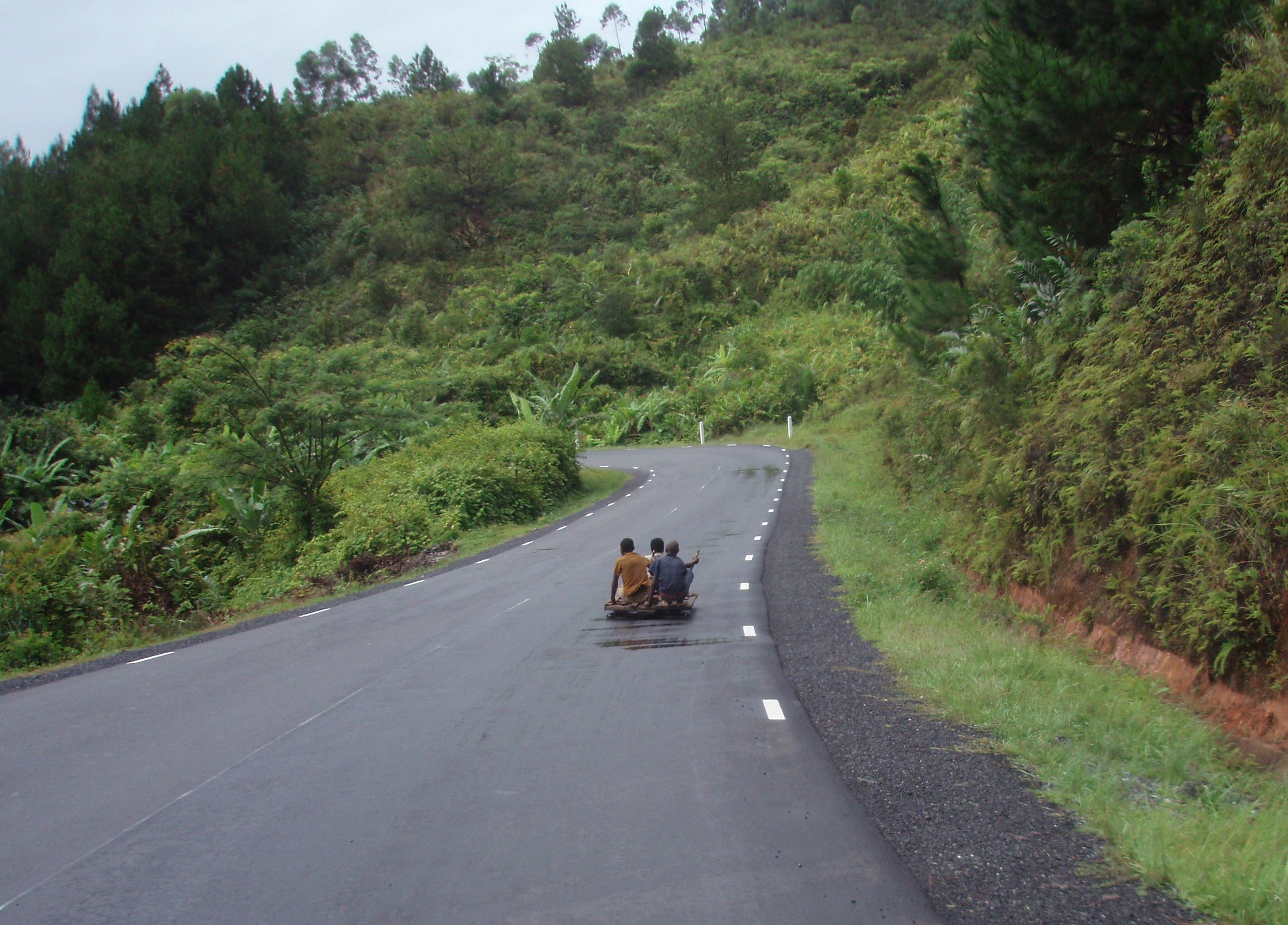
Route nationale 2 near Beforona

Route nationale 2 (RN2) is a primary highway in Madagascar. The route runs from the capital city of Antananarivo to Toamasina, a city on the eastern coast of the Madagascar.

The twisting route is served by taxi-brousses and buses.

In 2025, civil-society groups including Conservation International Madagascar raised environmental concerns about the Antananarivo-Toamasina highway project; the government said it would modify the route to avoid the Ankeniheny-Zahamena Corridor and other protected forests.

== Selected locations on route (from west to east) ==
- Antananarivo
- Ambohimangakely
- Sambaina
- Ambanitsena
- Manjakandriana (48 km from Antananarivo)
- Mangoro River Bridge
- Moramanga (junction with RN 44)
- Analamazoatra Reserve and Andasibe-Mantadia National Park
- Beforona
- Ranomafana Est
- Antsampanana (junction with RN 11)
- Brickaville
- Rianila River Bridge
- Toamasina

== Gallery ==
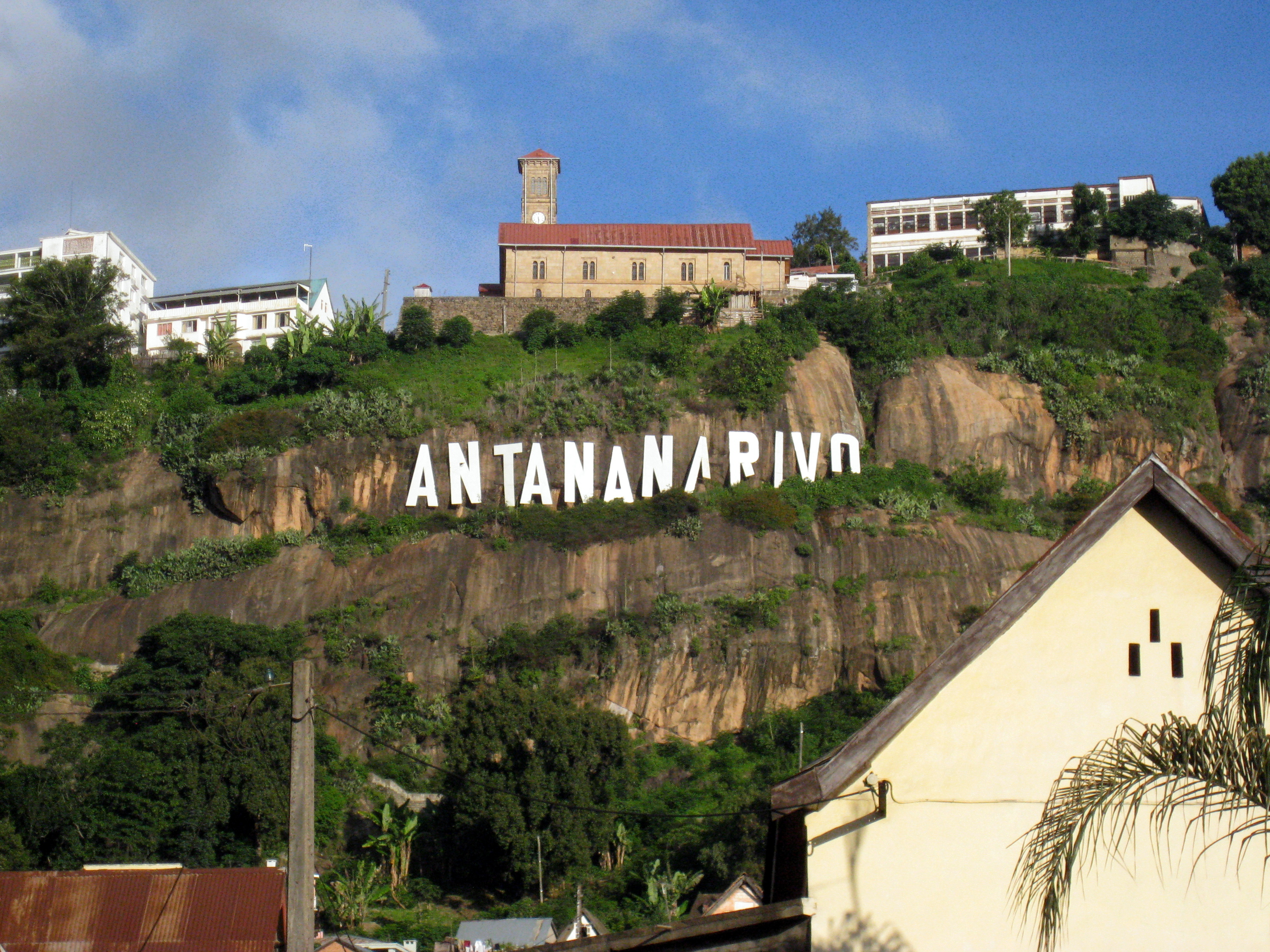
the capital of Antananarivo

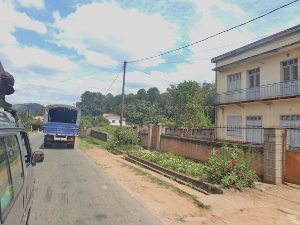
Sambaina

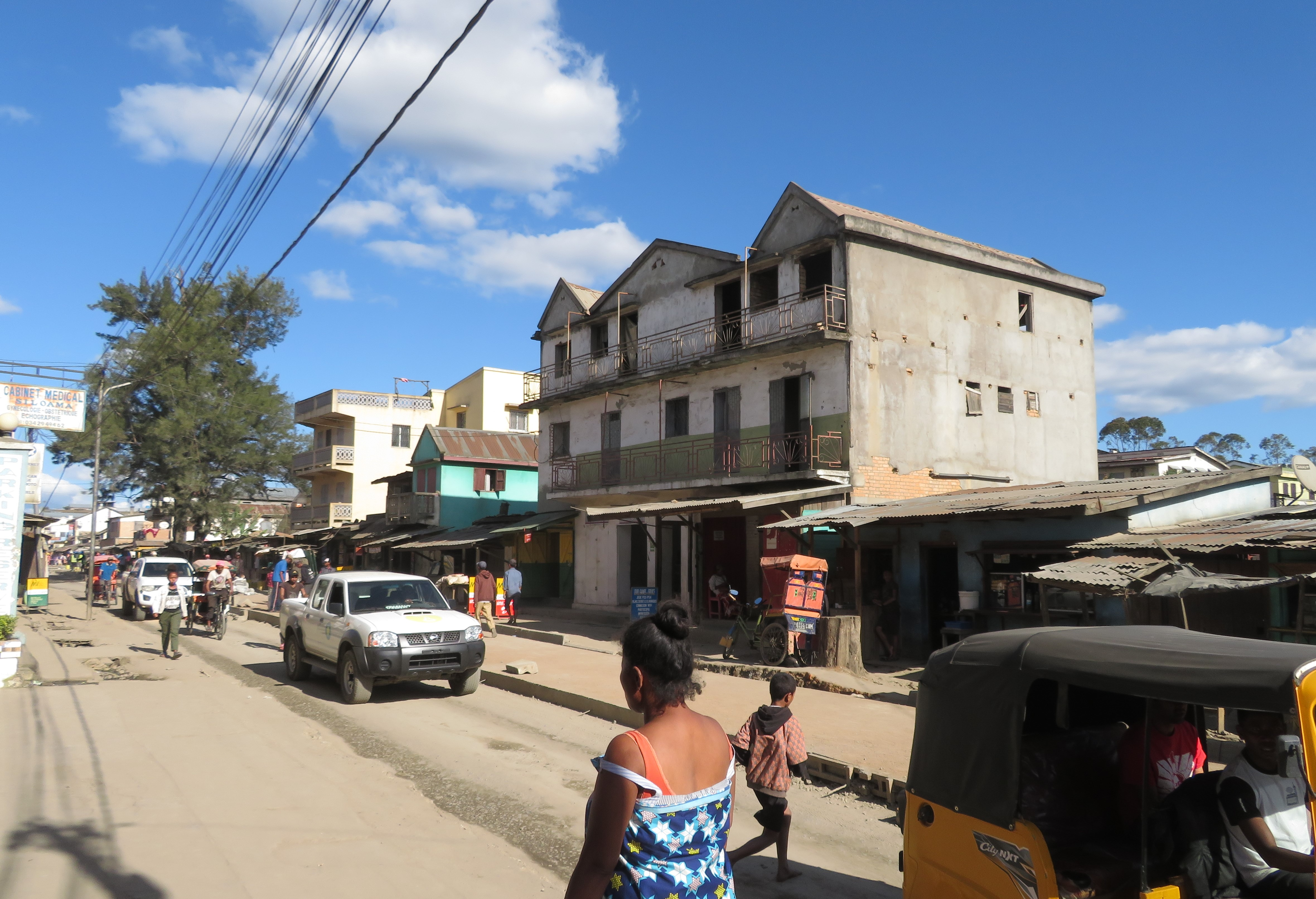
Moramanga

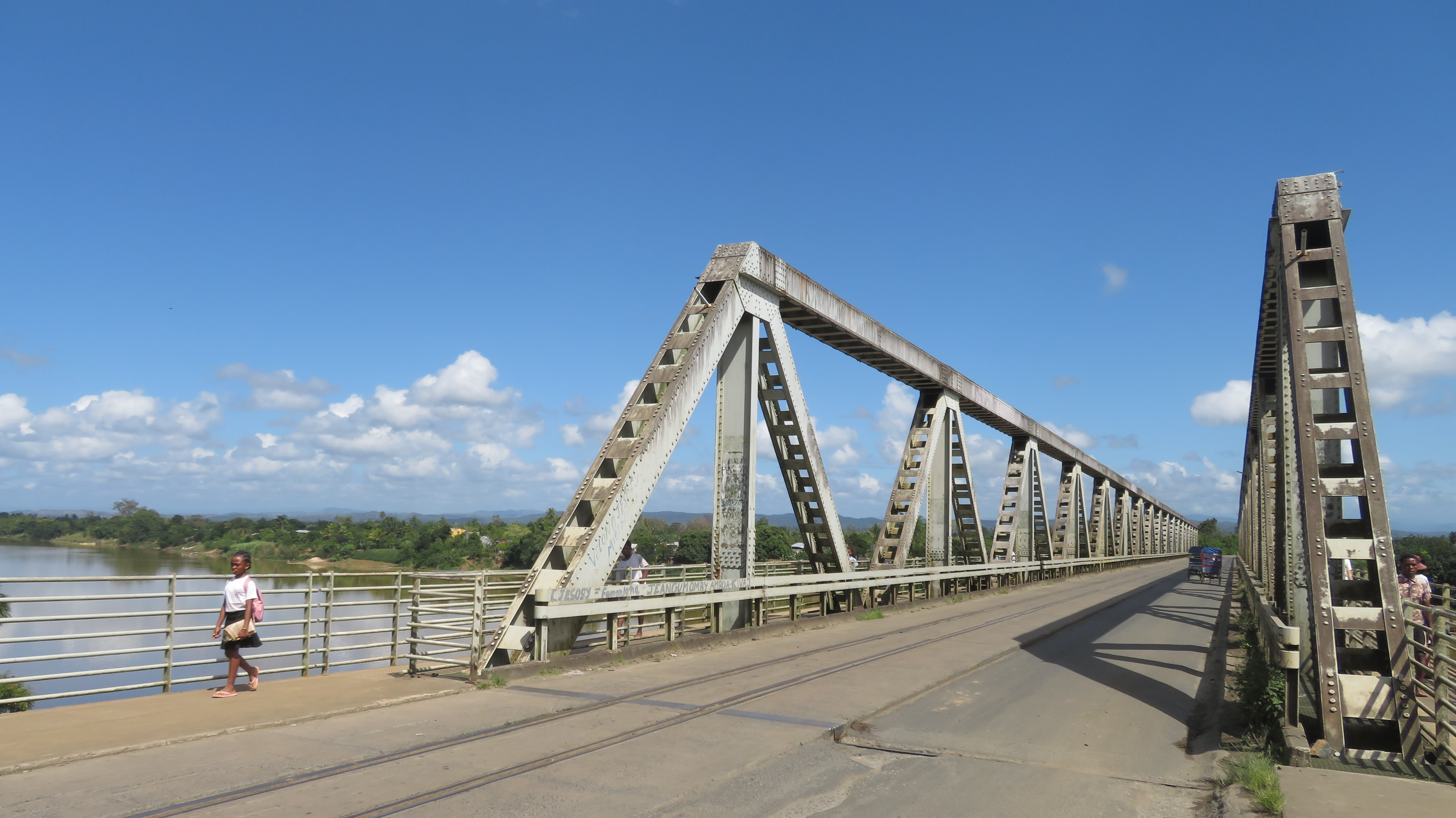
Bridge over Rianila river near Brickaville

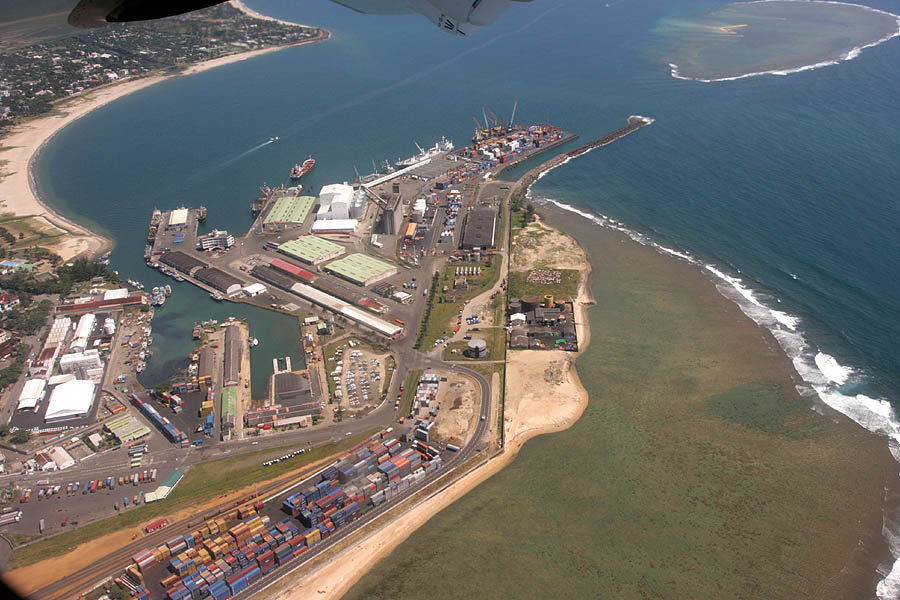
port of Toamasina (Tamatave)

== See also ==
- List of roads in Madagascar
- Transport in Madagascar
