= Analamazaotra National Park =

National park in Madagascar

- IUCN category II (national park)
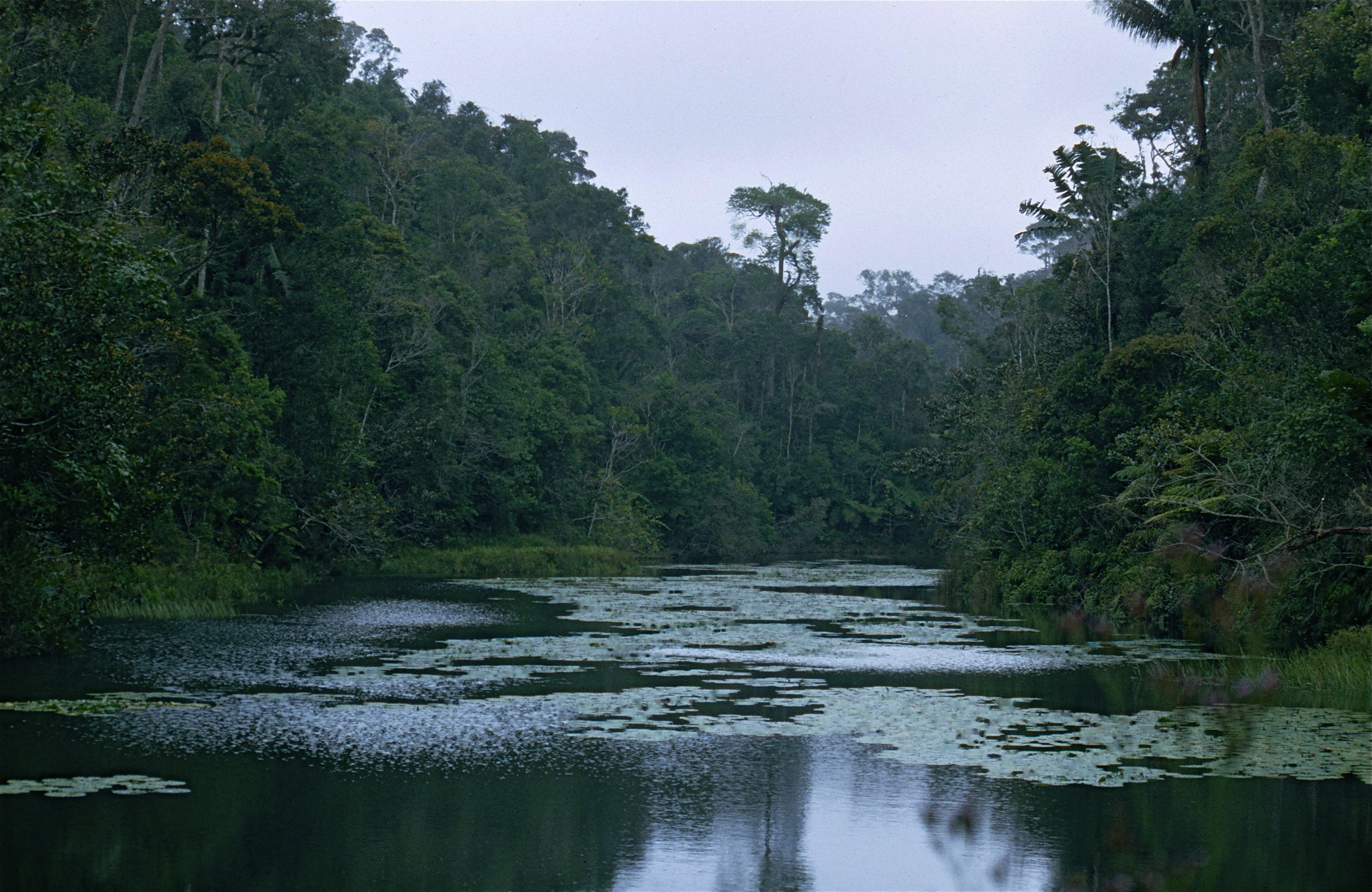
- Analamazaotra National Park, November 1998

- Location within Madagascar
- Location: Alaotra-Mangoro, Madagascar
- Coordinates: 18°56′10″S 48°25′42″E
- Area: 26.53 km^{2} (10.24 sq mi)
- Established: 1970 (special reserve), 21 April 2015 (national park)
- Governing body: Madagascar National Parks Association

Analamazaotra National Park is a national park of Madagascar. The park is in the eastern portion of Madagascar's Central Highlands. The neighbouring Analamazaotra Forest Station is a local reforestation effort. It adjoins Andasibe-Mantadia National Park to the north.

The reserve is situated in the region Alaotra-Mangoro, close to Moramanga and Andasibe.

Analamazaotra National Park is located 27 kilometres (17 mi) from Moramanga and is bordered on the south by National road 2, a secondary road to Andasibe and a railway line between Antananarivo and Toamasina.

== Conservation ==
Analamazaotra Special Reserve, also known as Périnet-Analamazaotra, was established in 1970. On 21 April 2015, the special reserve was combined with the adjacent Analamazaotra Forest Station to create Analamazaotra National Park via Decree No. 2015-732.
