= Andasibe-Mantadia National Park =

National park in Madagascar

- IUCN category II (national park)
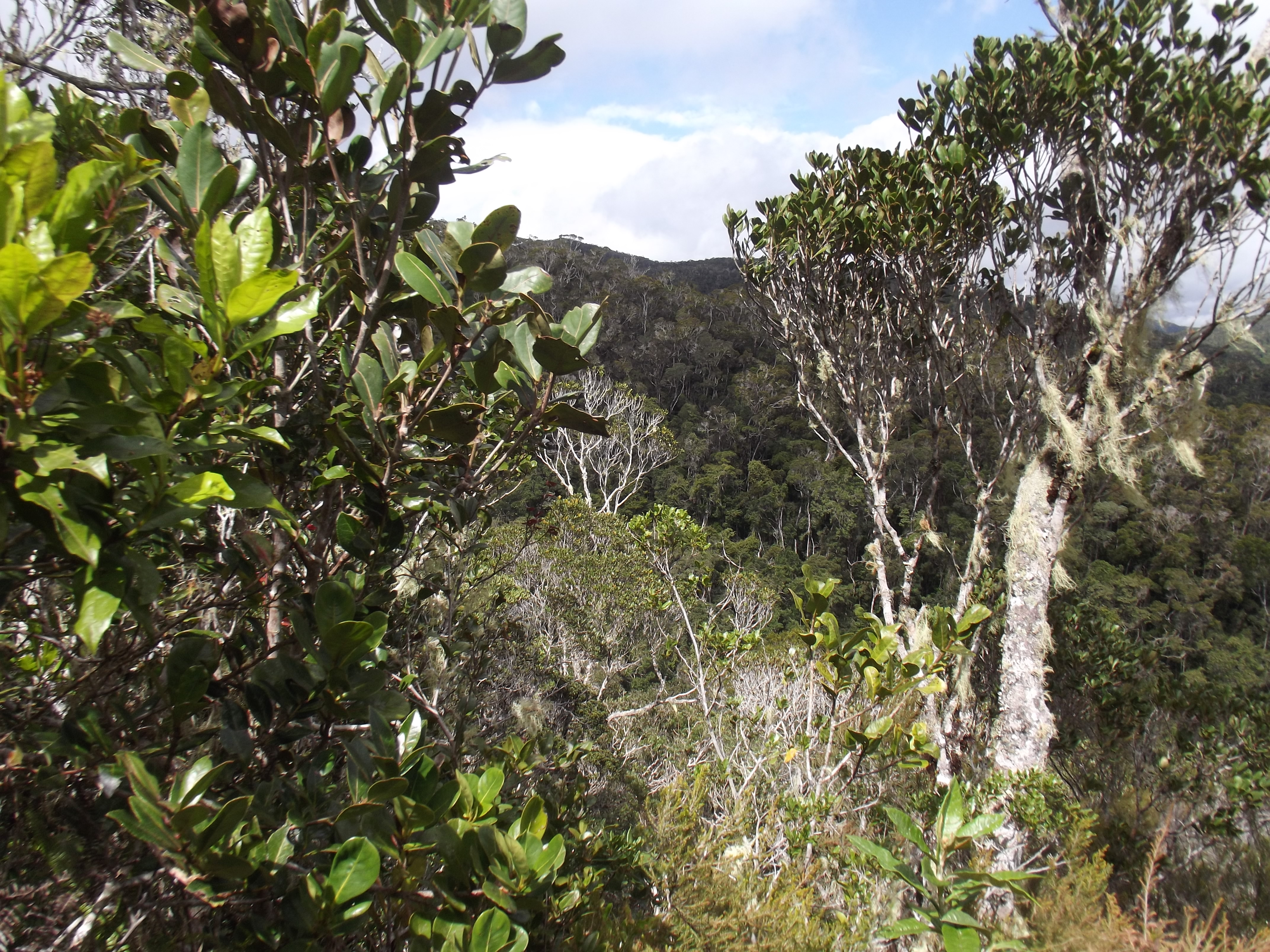

- Location within Madagascar
- Location: Eastern Madagascar
- Nearest city: Moramanga, Andasibe (Périnet)
- Coordinates: 18°56′09″S 48°24′53″E
- Area: 155 km^{2}
- Established: 1989
- Visitors: 26,054 (in 2011)
- Governing body: Madagascar National Parks Association (PNM-ANGAP)

Andasibe-Mantadia National Park is a 155 square kilometre protected area, located about 150 km east of Antananarivo, consisting principally of primary growth forest in the Alaotra-Mangoro Region in eastern Madagascar. The park's elevation ranges from 800 to 1260 meters, with a humid climate. Average annual precipitation is 1700 mm, with rainfall on 210 days of each year. This rainforest is habitat to a vast species biodiversity, including many endemic rare species and endangered species, including 11 lemur species. The park's two component parts are Mantadia National Park and Analamazoatra Reserve, which is best known for its population of Madagascar's largest lemur, the indri.

The national park was nominated in 2007 to become part of the World Heritage Site of Rainforests of the Atsinanana. However, its forests were not selected for the final list.

This is one of the easiest parks in Madagascar to visit from the capital city, Antananarivo, with a 3-hour drive east on a paved road, Route Nationale 2 (RN 2). While Analamazaotra and park headquarters are short walks from Antsapanana on the RN 2, special transport must be arranged or hired from local hotels to reach Mantadia. Hikes ranging from 1–6 hours are typically available in both parts of the park. A local guide is required for visitors entering either part of the park.

== History ==
The Analamazaotra (or Périnet) Special Reserve (ASR), known locally as Andasibe after the nearby village, was once part of the larger Mantadia National Park which also included Maromizaha Classified Forest to the southeast and Anosibe an'ala to the south. However logging and deforestation for farming has resulted in these parks now being isolated.

The main threat to this park comes from the disappearance of adjoining habitat outside the park. This disappearance has been caused primarily by logging and replacement of rain-forest with commercial Australian eucalyptus and Chinese pine forests, and to a lesser extent by slash-and-burn cultivation for rice agriculture, which is exacerbated by the extremely high population growth rate and poverty in rural Madagascar.

In 2025, the park was designated as a biosphere reserve by UNESCO.

== Reintroduction program ==
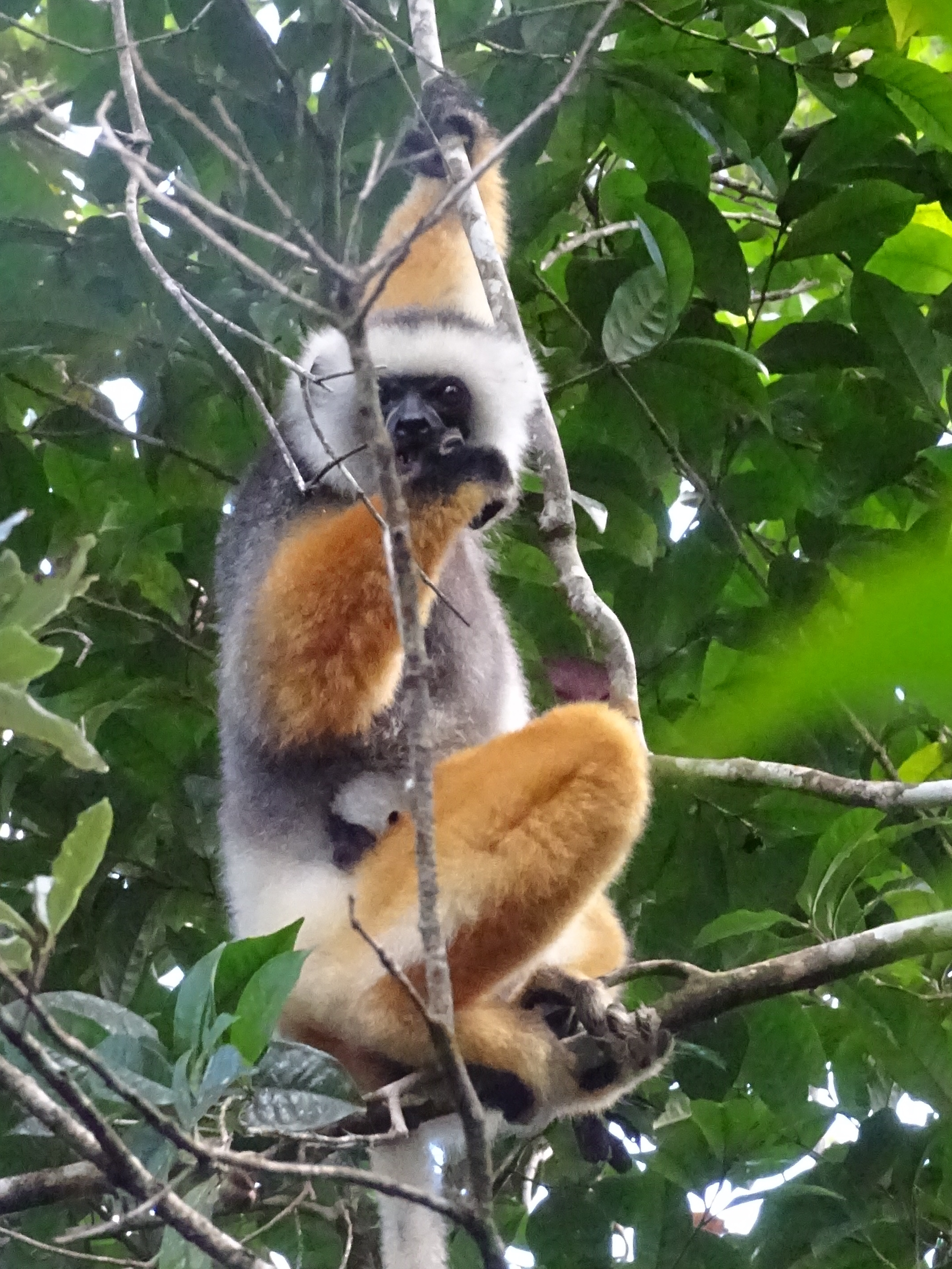
Diademed sifaka with 2-week-old baby

To address the disappearing habitat threat, reserves have been created in the vicinity of Andasibe-Mantadia that balance resource extraction with environmental protection, and attempt to create economic and environmentally preferable alternatives to replacing native forests with eucalyptus and pine.

In 2006, the Madagascar Biodiversity Partnership and Omaha's Henry Doorly Zoo & Aquarium, in collaboration with Madagascar National Parks and Eaux et Fôret initiated the Analamazaotra Re-introduction/Translocation (ART) project to reintroduce two endangered species of lemur back into the park. The aim was to take lemurs from threatened areas where habitat loss means the incumbent population is unsustainable, and relocate them to the relative safety of the Analamazaotra Special Reserve. The program followed the IUCN re-introduction/translocation guidelines, with family group monitoring before and after translocation.

By 2014, the ART project had reintroduced three groups comprising 26 diademed sifaka and 8 black-and-white ruffed lemur into the park. The project's multi-disciplinary team tracked the reintroduced groups using radio collars, and collected fecal samples to evaluate biomedical, genetic, habitat, nutritional and reproductive characteristics of the lemurs.

The project has so far been very successful, and visitors to this popular reserve have been lucky enough to see two generations of babies born at the park. The ART project also helps the local community by education and provides two local guides.

== See also ==
- Aye-aye (nocturnal)
- Black and white ruffed lemur
- Brown mouse lemur (nocturnal)
- Common brown lemur
- Diademed sifaka
- Gray bamboo lemur
- Eastern woolly lemur
- Greater dwarf lemur (nocturnal)
- Indri
- Red-bellied lemur
- National parks of Madagascar
- Sahatandra (river)
