= Ambodilafa =

- Location in Madagascar
- Coordinates: 20°30′S 48°11′E
- Country: Madagascar
- Region: Vatovavy
- District: Nosy Varika

Area
  - Total: 316 km^{2} (122 sq mi)
- Elevation: 223 m (732 ft)

Population (2018)
  - Total: 18.766
- Time zone: UTC3 (EAT)
- Postal code: 319

Ambodilafa is a town and commune in Madagascar. It belongs to the district of Nosy Varika, which is a part of the region of Vatovavy. The population of the commune was 18.766 in 2018.

== Geography ==
The commune lies at a distance of 94 km from Nosy Varika and 70 km off the crossroad at Ambandrika on the National Road 11. Only an unpaved piste serves this town.

== Transport ==
There is no transport available in Ambodilafa, nor for goods nor public transport. The villagers use food transport to Sahavato (32 km).

Only primary schooling is available. The majority 99% of the population of the commune are farmers. The most important crop is rice, while other important products are bananas, coffee and cassava. Services provide employment for 1% of the population.
