= Ampasinambo =

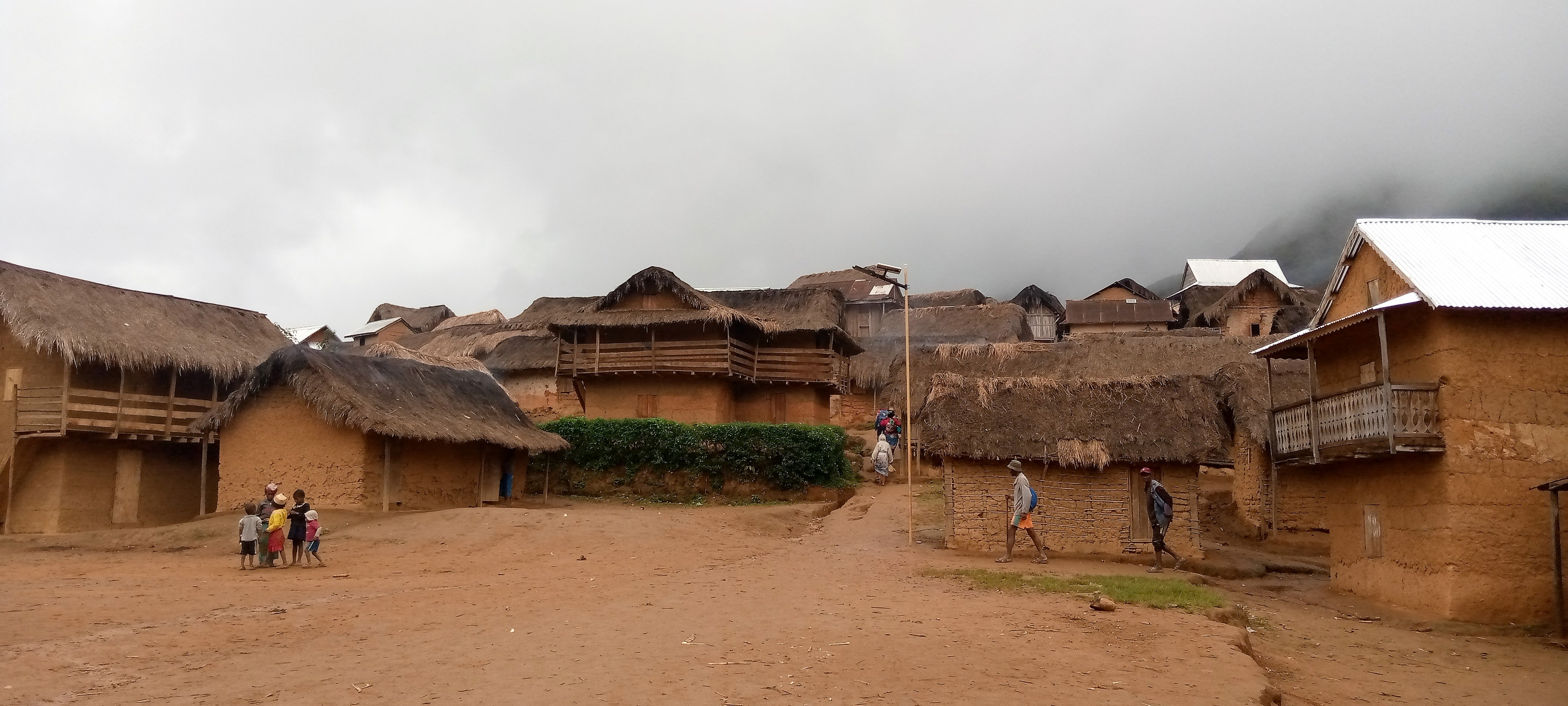

- Location in Madagascar
- Coordinates: 20°31′S 48°0′E
- Country: Madagascar
- Region: Vatovavy
- District: Nosy Varika

Area
  - Total: 450 km^{2} (170 sq mi)
- Elevation: 528 m (1,732 ft)

Population (2018)
  - Total: 13,774
  - Density: 60.5/km^{2} (157/sq mi)
- Time zone: UTC3 (EAT)
- Postal code: 319

Ampasinambo is a town and commune in Madagascar. It belongs to the district of Nosy Varika, which is a part of the region Vatovavy. The population of the commune was 13,774 in 2018.

== Geography ==
The commune lies at a distance of 132 km from Nosy Varika and 104 km off the crosspoint Ambandrika on the National Road 11. It is situated at the Namorona River.

The highest waterfall of Madagascar, the Sakaleona Falls, is situated at a distance of 18 km from this commune.

== Transport ==
Only a unpaved piste connects to this town. There is no public transport available.

Primary and junior level secondary education are available in town. The majority 99% of the population of the commune are farmers. The most important crop is rice, while other important products are coffee, sugarcane and beans. Services provide employment for 1% of the population.

An airstrip constructed through Mission Aviation Fellowship opened in July 2009.
