= Jean de Lille =

French Noble

Jean de Lille, Seneschal of Poitou was a 14th century French noble.

== Life ==
Lille raised a Poitevin army to besiege Lusignan Castle held by an Anglo-Gascon garrison in Summer 1349. He attacked an Anglo-Gason force of 500 mounted men, led by Thomas Coke, Seneschal of Gascony while they were on their way to relieve Lusignan. Intercepted the Anglo-Gascon force at Lunalonge, the Poitevins numbered some 1,500 men. Approaching the Anglo-Gascon force in three mounted battles, the Anglo-Gascons withdrew to a small rise and dismounted. The Anglo-Gascons sent their horses to their baggage train at the rear. The Poitevins circled round the Anglo-Gascons, attacking their baggage train and then proceeded to attack the rear of the Anglo-Gascons. The first two Poitevin battles charged at the Anglo-Gascons, but they stood firm, using their lances as improvised pikes. The Poitevins repeatedly attacked the Anglo-Gascons lines but failed to break through into the Anglo-Gascon schiltron and suffered heavy casualties. The third Poitevin battle did not attack, holding its position waiting for any opportunity to exploit any weaknesses in the Anglo-Gascon lines. When none had arisen by nightfall the third Poitevin battle retreated back to Lusignan with the captured horses. In the course of the fighting, 300 Poitevins were killed and many were captured, including Lille and Jean de Boucicault.
