= Thomas Coke (seneschal of Gascony) =

English noble

Sir Thomas Coke, Seneschal of Gascony, was a 14th-century English noble.

== Life ==
Coke was the eldest son of Thomas Coke, Lord of Dudlington. He was created a knight banneret during his lifetime. Coke was the marshal of the army of Henry, 3rd Earl of Lancaster, the lieutenant of King Edward III of England and accompanied the Earl of Lancaster to Spain in 1343. He was the Seneschal of Gascony between 25 March 1347 and 1349.

While leading an Anglo-Gascon relief force of 500 mounted men to relieve Lusignan Castle in 1349, Coke was intercepted by a Poitevin army, led by Jean de Lille, Seneschal of Poitou at Lunalonge. The Poitevins numbered some 1,500 men, which approached the Anglo-Gascon force in three mounted battles. The Anglo-Gascons withdrew to a small rise, dismounted and sent their horses to their baggage train at the rear. The Poitevins circled round the Anglo-Gascons, attacking their baggage train and then proceeded attacked the rear of the Anglo-Gascons. The first two Poitevin battles charged at the Anglo-Gascons, but they stood firm, using their lances as improvised pikes. The Poitevins repeatedly attacked the Anglo-Gascons lines but failed to break through into the Anglo-Gascon schiltron and suffered heavy casualties. The third Poitevin battle did not attack, holding its position waiting for any opportunity to exploit any weaknesses in the Anglo-Gascon lines. When none had arisen by nightfall the third Poitevin battle retreated back to Lusignan with the captured horses. In the course of the fighting, 300 Poitevins were killed and many were captured, including Lille and Jean de Boucicault.

He was appointed the captain of Villefranche in 1350. Coke died before his father and Coke's only son Thomas died without issue.
