= Nosy Varika District =

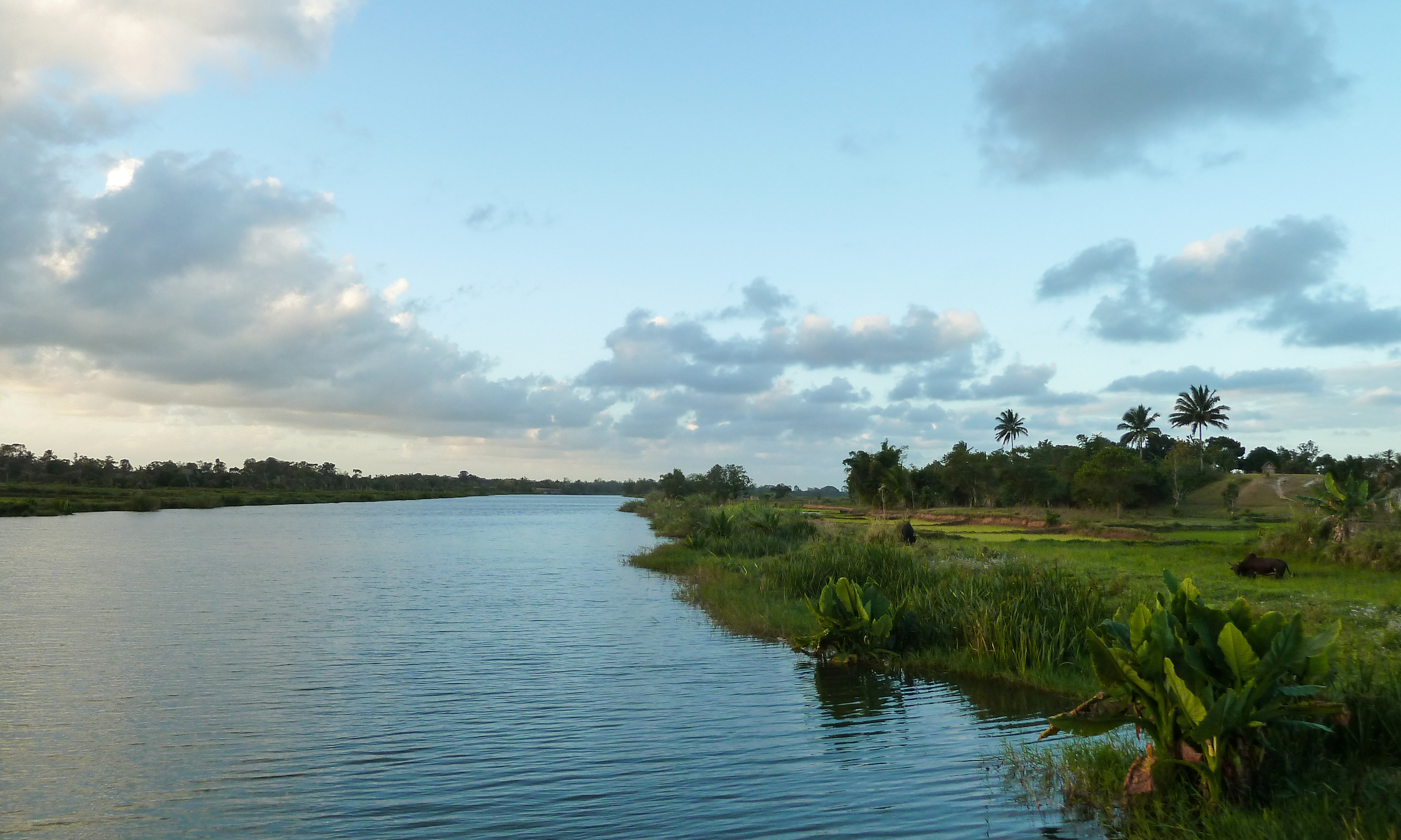

- Location in Madagascar
- Coordinates: 20°35′S 48°32′E
- Country: Madagascar
- Region: Vatovavy
- District: Nosy Varika

Area
  - Total: 3,828 km^{2} (1,478 sq mi)
- Elevation: 5 m (16 ft)

Population (2020)
  - Total: 270,332
  - Density: 70.62/km^{2} (182.9/sq mi)
- Time zone: UTC3 (EAT)
- Code postal: 319

Nosy Varika is a district of Vatovavy in Madagascar. The district has a population of 270,332 in 2020.

== Bodies of water ==
- Sakaleona Falls - the highest Waterfall in Madagascar, with 200m height. 18 km from Ampasinambo
- Sakaleona River

== Communes ==
The district is further divided into 19 communes. The postal code for the district is 319.

- Ambahy
- Ambakobe
- Ambodiara
- Ambodilafa
- Ambodirian I Sahafary
- Ampasinambo
- Andara
- Androrangovola
- Angodogodona
- Antanambao
- Befody
- Fanivelona
- Fiadanana
- Nosy Varika
- Sahavato
- Soavina Est
- Vohilava
- Vohindroa
- Vohitrandriana
