= Thuès-les-Bains =

Hamlet and former spa in Nyer, Pyrénées-Orientales, France

Coordinates: 42.5290°N 2.2482°E

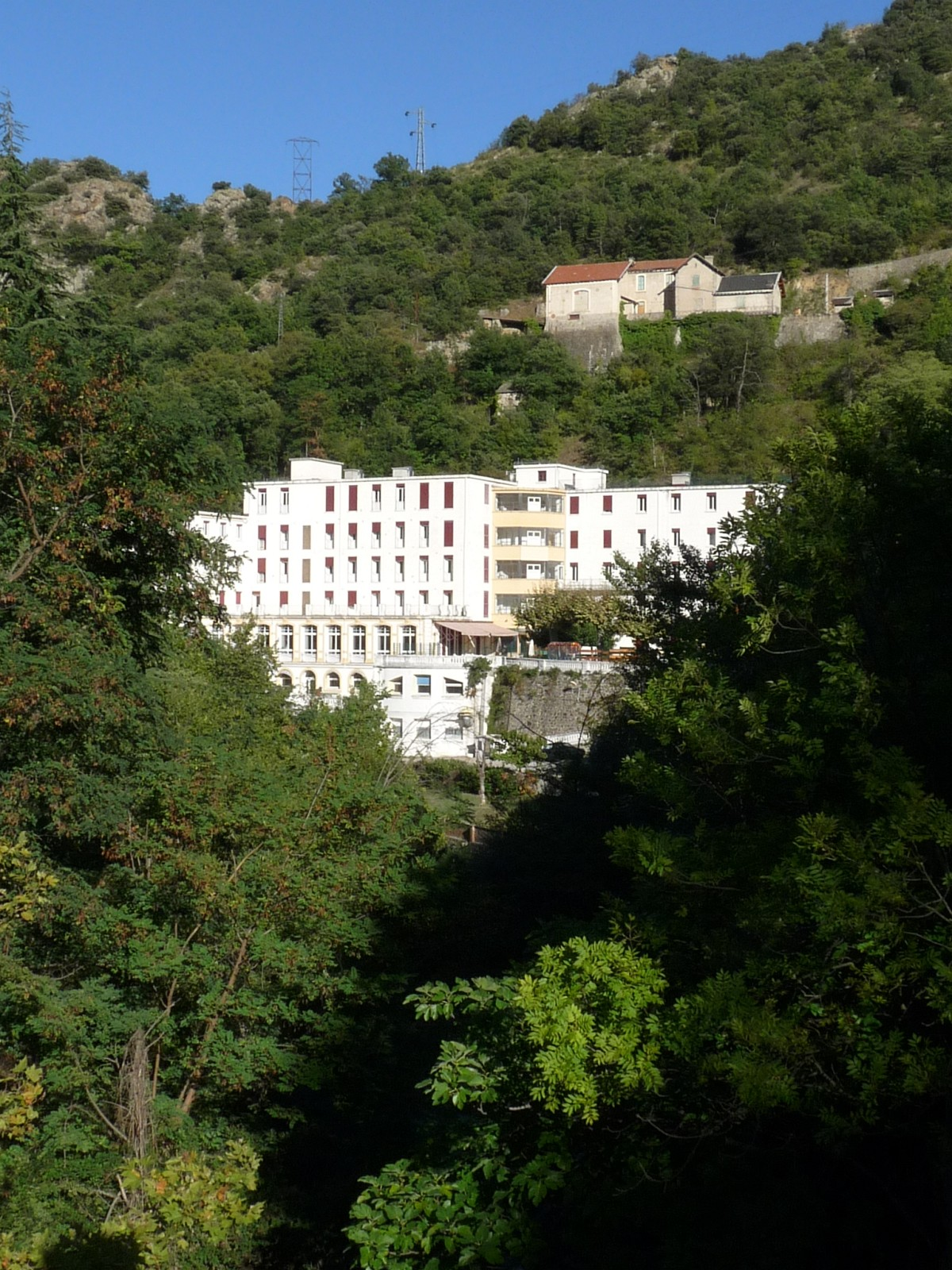
View of Thuès-les-Bains

Thuès-les-Bains is a hamlet located within the commune of Nyer, in the Pyrénées-Orientales department of southern France. A thermal spa was established there in the 19th century along the banks of the Têt River. Over time, the spa was repurposed into a functional rehabilitation center and later a specialized care facility.

Hot springs in the vicinity have driven the development of thermal tourism in the area. Since the early 21st century, warm-water canyoning activities have been offered in the Faget stream, which flows into the Têt just upstream of the hamlet.

== Location and access ==
Thuès-les-Bains is administratively part of the commune of Nyer, approximately four kilometers by road from Nyer's village center and less than two kilometers from the neighboring upstream commune of Thuès-Entre-Valls.

The hamlet lies adjacent to the N116 road, connecting Bourg-Madame upstream to Perpignan downstream.

== History ==
Situated near the historic hot springs of Eixalada, Thuès-les-Bains was originally part of the commune of En until it was merged into Nyer in 1822. The thermal baths were constructed in 1860, during the peak of Pyrenean thermalism, spurred by railway development and promoted by Empress Eugénie, wife of Napoleon III.

== Tourism and nearby culture ==
=== Sports activities ===
Just upstream from the hamlet, the Faget stream enables warm-water canyoning, even in winter, due to thermal springs with temperatures reaching up to 60 °C (140 °F). While the stream is close to Thuès-les-Bains, it lies administratively on the border of Thuès-Entre-Valls.

=== Saint-André d'Eixalada Monastery ===
The Saint-André d'Eixalada Monastery, built in 840 near the hot springs on the right bank of the Têt River, about one kilometer downstream from the current thermal facility, was destroyed by a flood in October 878. Less than forty years after its construction, the monks relocated to found the Abbey of Saint-Michel de Cuxa near Prades. No traces remain of the original Early Middle Ages structures.

== See also ==
- Thuès-les-Bains station
- Nyer
- Thuès-Entre-Valls
- Têt (river)
- Pyrénées-Orientales
- Saint-Michel de Cuxa
