= Battle of Lunalonge =

1349 battle of the Hundred Years' War

- Part of Hundred Years' War
Date	Late May or early June 1349
Location	Limalonges, Deux-Sèvres 46.1308°N 0.1697°E
Result	Anglo-Gascon victory

Belligerents
France	Anglo-Gascons

Commanders and leaders
Jean de Lille, Seneschal of Poitou (POW)	Thomas Coke, Seneschal of Gascony

Strength
Approx 1,500	Approx 500

Casualties and losses
300 killed plus others captured	Light, but all horses lost and baggage looted

The Battle of Lunalonge was fought in the summer of 1349 between a French force numbering approximately 1,500 men and an Anglo-Gascon force of some 500 men, during the first phase of the Hundred Years' War. The location of the battle is thought to have been modern Limalonges in Deux-Sèvres. The outnumbered Anglo-Gascons, commanded by Thomas Coke, gained the upper hand during the day, but had to withdraw on foot during the night because the French, under Jean de Lille, had captured their horses. The French lost approximately 300 killed and an unknown but large number captured, including their leader.

== Background ==
France in 1328 Under French royal control in 1214 Gained from English control by 1330 England and English controlled Guyenne/Gascony in 1330

Since the Norman Conquest of 1066, English monarchs had held titles and lands within France, the possession of which made them vassals of the kings of France. The status of the English kings' French fiefs was a major source of conflict between the two monarchies throughout the Middle Ages. French monarchs systematically sought to check the growth of English power, stripping away lands as the opportunity arose. By 1337 only Gascony in south western France and Ponthieu in northern France were still English-controlled. The Gascons had their own language and customs. A large proportion of the red wine that they produced was shipped to England in a profitable trade. This trade provided the English king with much of his revenue. The Gascons preferred their relationship with a distant English king who left them alone, to one with a French king who would interfere in their affairs.

Following a series of disagreements between Philip VI of France and Edward III of England, on 24 May 1337 Philip's Great Council in Paris agreed that the Duchy of Aquitaine, which included all of Gascony, should be taken back into Philip's hands on the grounds that Edward was in breach of his obligations as a vassal. This marked the start of the Hundred Years' War, which was to last one hundred and sixteen years. Although Gascony was the cause of the war, Edward was able to spare few resources for it and up to 1349 whenever an English army campaigned on the continent it operated in northern France. In most campaigning seasons the Gascons had had to rely on their own resources and had been hard pressed by the French.

== Prelude ==
In November 1348 the Truce of Calais was agreed between the two kings. In May 1349 it was extended for twelve months. It was almost completely ignored in the south west, where a series of raids and actions were fought in eastern Gascony in the summer of 1349. The Seneschal of Poitou, Jean de Lille, had raised a force of local Poitevins to besiege Anglo-Gascon held castle of Lusignan. In late May Thomas Coke, Seneschal of Gascony, led a force of 500 mounted men, composed largely of native Gascons, from Bordeaux to the relief of Lusignan. He was intercepted at Lunalonge by 1,500 French under de Lille. The location of the battle is thought to have been modern Limalonges in Deux-Sèvres. Among the forces on the Anglo-Gascon side was Jean de Grailly, Captal de Buch, later to be a famous commander; while among the French rode Jean le Maingre, known as Boucicault, later marshal of France.

== Battle ==
The French approached the English in three mounted bodies or battles. The Anglo-Gascons withdrew to a small rise and dismounted as was the fashion among English armies of the time. They sent their horses to their baggage train at the rear. The French were wary of attacking the English position head on; earlier in the war, this tactic had fared badly. Instead they took advantage of their superior mobility, circled round the Anglo-Gascons, overran their baggage train, captured their horses and attacked the dismounted Anglo-Gascons from the rear. The first two French battles charged home, but the Anglo-Gascons stood firm, using their lances as improvised pikes. The French repeatedly attacked but failed to break into the Anglo-Gascon schiltron and suffered heavy casualties. The third French battle did not attack, but held its position waiting for any opportunity to exploit. When none had arisen by nightfall, the survivors of the French force, having been defeated in detail, retreated back to Lusignan with the captured horses. In the course of the fighting, 300 French were killed and many were captured, including Lille and Boucicault. That night the Anglo-Gascons withdrew on foot with their prisoners to a nearby fortification.

== Aftermath ==
On the return journey Coke sent a detachment to reconnoiter the large castle at Taillebourg, which controlled the most important crossing of the River Charente. The detachment took the French by surprise and captured the fortress early in June. In early August the French formally repudiated the ill-observed Truce of Calais, by some accounts due to the loss of Taillebourg. By this time the French had abandoned the siege of Lusignan; the following summer a fresh French army captured the town.

== Bibliography ==
- Bennett, Matthew (1999). "The Development of Battle Tactics in the Hundred Years War". In Curry, Anne; Hughes, Michael (eds.). Arms, Armies and Fortifications in the Hundred Years War. Woodbridge: Boydell & Brewer Ltd. pp. 69–82. ISBN 9780851157559.
- Burne, A.H. (1991) [1955]. The Crecy War. London: Greenhill Books. ISBN 978-1853670817.
- Crowcroft, Robert; Cannon, John (2015). "Gascony". The Oxford Companion to British History. Oxford: Oxford University Press. p. 389. ISBN 978-0199677832.
- Harris, Robin (1994). Valois Guyenne. Royal Historical Society Studies in History. Vol. 71. London: Boydell Press. ISBN 978-0-86193-226-9.
- Lacey, Robert (2008). Great tales from English History. London: Folio Society. OCLC 261939337.
- Oman, Charles (1998). A History of the Art of War in the Middle Ages: 1278–1485 A.D. London: Greenhill Books. ISBN 9781853673320.
- Prestwich, M. (2005). J.M. Roberts (ed.). Plantagenet England 1225–1360. Oxford: Clarendon Press (published 2005-09-15). ISBN 978-0-19-822844-8.
- Sumption, Jonathan (1990). The Hundred Years War 1: Trial by Battle. London: Faber & Faber. ISBN 978-0-571-13895-1.
- Sumption, Jonathan (1999). The Hundred Years War 2: Trial by Fire. London: Faber & Faber. ISBN 978-0-571-13896-8.
- Tout, T.F. (1905). "Some Neglected Fights between Crecy and Poitiers". English Historical Review. 20 (80): 726–730. doi:10.1093/ehr/xx.lxxx.726. JSTOR 548574.
