= Tanambao =

Tanambao may mean several communes in Madagascar:

- Tanambao Marivorahona in Ambilobe District, Diana Region.
- Tanambao Daoud in Sambava District, Sava Region.
- Tanambao Besakay in Ambatondrazaka District, Alaotra-Mangoro Region.
- Tanambao Ambony in Atsimo-Andrefana region.
- Tanambao Tsirandrana in Androy Region.
- Tanambao Verrerie, a suburb of Toamasina
