= Ambodiara =

Rural commune in Madagascar

- Location in Madagascar
- Coordinates: 20°02′S 48°19′E
- Country: Madagascar
- Region: Vatovavy
- District: Nosy Varika

Population (2018)
  - Total: 7,417
- Time zone: UTC3 (EAT)
- postal code: 319

Ambodiara is a rural commune in Madagascar. It belongs to the district of Nosy Varika, which is a part of the region Vatovavy. The population of the commune was 7,417 in 2018.

This commune has been created recently by dividing the commune of Befody.
