= Vohilava, Nosy Varika =

Vohilava
- Location in Madagascar
- Coordinates: 20°42′S 48°21′E
- Country: Madagascar
- Region: Vatovavy
- District: Nosy Varika
- Elevation: 74 m (243 ft)

Population (2018)
  - Total: 11,526
- Time zone: UTC3 (EAT)
- Postal code: 319

Vohilava is a rural municipality Madagascar. It belongs to the district of Nosy Varika, which is a part of Vatovavy.

It is situated at the RN 24 near Nosy Varika, at 60 km from Mananjary. It is situated on the Isaka River.

The population of this municipality was estimated to be 11526 in 2018.

Only primary schooling is available. The majority 98% of the population of the commune are farmers. The most important crop is rice, while other important products are coffee and cassava. Services provide employment for 2% of the population.

Also gold is mined in the Isaka River.
