= Soalazaina =

- Town and commune
- Location in Madagascar
- Coordinates: 18°1′S 48°4′E
- Country: Madagascar
- Region: Alaotra-Mangoro
- District: Ambatondrazaka
- Elevation: 918 m (3,012 ft)

Population (2001)
  - Total: 8,000
- Time zone: UTC3 (EAT)

Soalazaina is a town and commune (Malagasy: kaominina) in Madagascar. It belongs to the district of Ambatondrazaka, which is a part of Alaotra-Mangoro Region. The population of the commune was estimated to be approximately 8,000 according to the 2001 commune census.

Primary and junior level secondary education are available in town. The majority of the population (80%) of the commune are farmers, while 15% receives their livelihood from raising livestock. The most important crop is rice; other essential products include beans, cassava, and bambara groundnut. Services provide employment for 5% of the population.
