= Ambohitsilaozana =

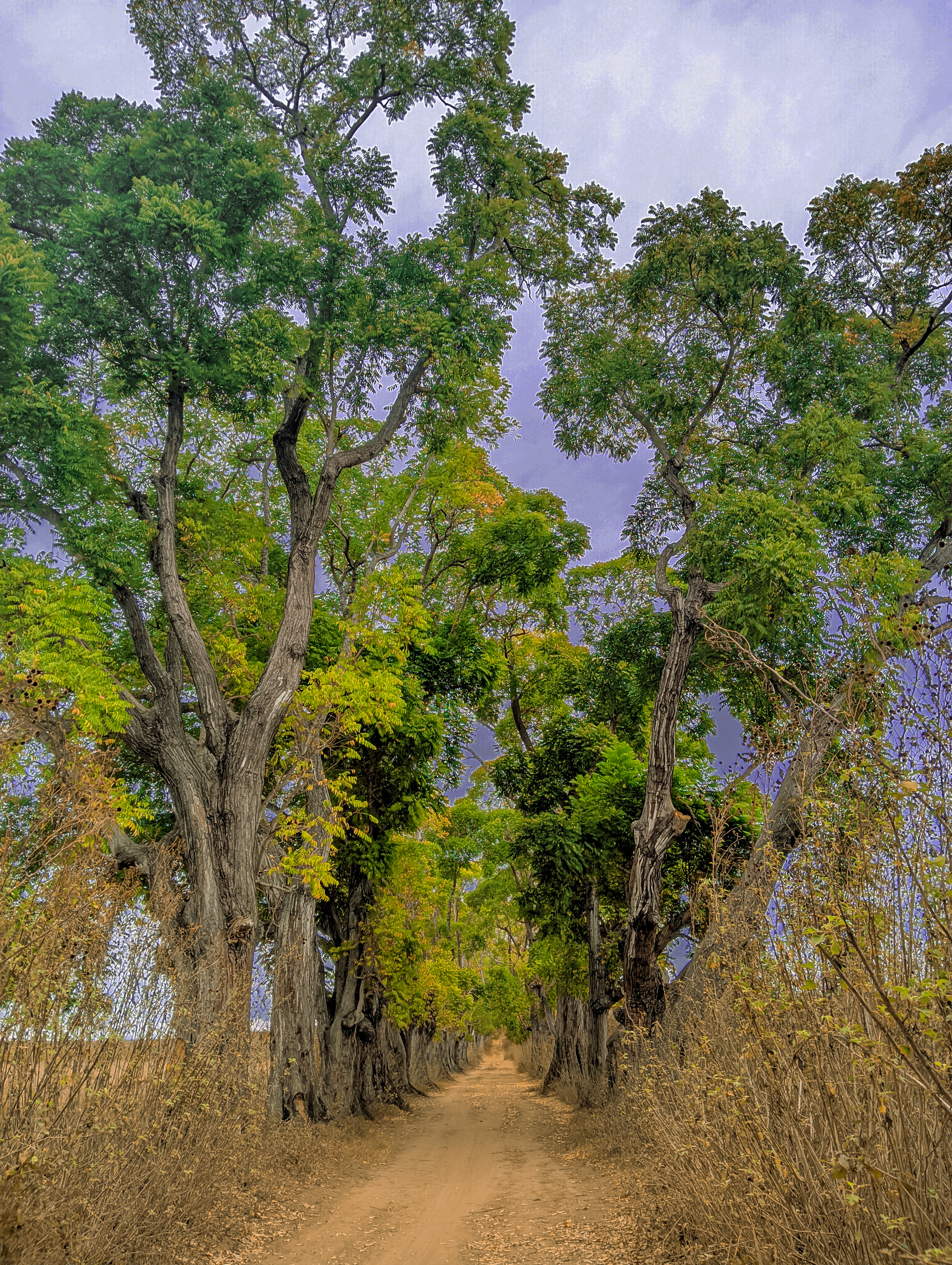
- Ambohitsilaozana

- Location in Madagascar
- Coordinates: 17°41′S 48°27′E
- Country: Madagascar
- Region: Alaotra-Mangoro
- District: Ambatondrazaka
- Elevation: 761 m (2,497 ft)

Population (2001)
  - Total: 13,000
- Time zone: UTC3 (EAT)
- Postal code: 503
- Climate: Cwa

Ambohitsilaozana is a municipality in Madagascar. It belongs to the district of Ambatondrazaka, which is a part of Alaotra-Mangoro Region. The population of the commune was estimated to be approximately 13,000 in 2001 commune census.

Primary and junior level secondary education are available in town. The majority 90% of the population of the commune are farmers, while an additional 3% receives their livelihood from raising livestock. The most important crop is rice, while other important products are peanuts and tomato. Services provide employment for 2% of the population. Additionally fishing employs 5% of the population.

== Climate ==
Climate data for Ambohitsilaozana (1991–2020)
| Month | Jan | Feb | Mar | Apr | May | Jun | Jul | Aug | Sep | Oct | Nov | Dec | Year |
|---|---|---|---|---|---|---|---|---|---|---|---|---|---|
| Record high °C (°F) | 33.8 (92.8) | 32.5 (90.5) | 33.6 (92.5) | 32.0 (89.6) | 31.2 (88.2) | 29.7 (85.5) | 28.6 (83.5) | 30.5 (86.9) | 33.8 (92.8) | 34.0 (93.2) | 34.1 (93.4) | 34.4 (93.9) | 34.4 (93.9) |
| Mean daily maximum °C (°F) | 28.3 (82.9) | 28.1 (82.6) | 27.9 (82.2) | 27.2 (81.0) | 25.7 (78.3) | 23.5 (74.3) | 22.5 (72.5) | 23.4 (74.1) | 25.1 (77.2) | 27.2 (81.0) | 28.8 (83.8) | 29.0 (84.2) | 26.4 (79.5) |
| Daily mean °C (°F) | 23.8 (74.8) | 23.7 (74.7) | 23.3 (73.9) | 22.3 (72.1) | 20.6 (69.1) | 18.4 (65.1) | 17.4 (63.3) | 17.9 (64.2) | 19.3 (66.7) | 21.2 (70.2) | 22.8 (73.0) | 23.8 (74.8) | 21.2 (70.2) |
| Mean daily minimum °C (°F) | 19.2 (66.6) | 19.2 (66.6) | 18.7 (65.7) | 17.2 (63.0) | 15.4 (59.7) | 13.3 (55.9) | 12.4 (54.3) | 12.4 (54.3) | 13.4 (56.1) | 15.1 (59.2) | 16.9 (62.4) | 18.5 (65.3) | 16.0 (60.8) |
| Record low °C (°F) | 11.0 (51.8) | 14.4 (57.9) | 12.6 (54.7) | 10.4 (50.7) | 9.0 (48.2) | 5.0 (41.0) | 6.3 (43.3) | 6.5 (43.7) | 6.8 (44.2) | 8.7 (47.7) | 10.9 (51.6) | 12.9 (55.2) | 5.0 (41.0) |
| Average rainfall mm (inches) | 288.8 (11.37) | 237.6 (9.35) | 149.2 (5.87) | 30.6 (1.20) | 13.0 (0.51) | 7.9 (0.31) | 8.6 (0.34) | 4.7 (0.19) | 6.2 (0.24) | 20.7 (0.81) | 55.8 (2.20) | 175.7 (6.92) | 998.8 (39.32) |
| Average rainy days (≥ 1.0 mm) | 15.8 | 14.1 | 10.5 | 3.4 | 1.8 | 2.3 | 2.0 | 1.2 | 1.2 | 2.0 | 5.6 | 10.9 | 70.8 |
Source: NOAA
