= Ampitatsimo =

- Location in Madagascar
- Coordinates: 17°47′S 48°23′E
- Country: Madagascar
- Region: Alaotra-Mangoro
- District: Ambatondrazaka
- Elevation: 761 m (2,497 ft)

Population (2001)
  - Total: 13,000
- Time zone: UTC3 (EAT)

Ampitatsimo (also Ampitasimo) is a town and commune (Malagasy: kaominina) in Madagascar. It belongs to the district of Ambatondrazaka, which is a part of Alaotra-Mangoro Region. The population of the commune was estimated to be approximately 13,000 in a 2001 commune census.

Primary and junior level secondary education are available in town. The majority 95% of the population of the commune are farmers, while an additional 1.5% receives their livelihood from raising livestock. The most important crop is rice, while other important products are beans, maize and sweet potatoes. Services provide employment for 0.5% of the population. Additionally fishing employs 3% of the population.
