= Fanivelona =

- Location in Madagascar
- Coordinates: 20°32′S 48°33′E
- Country: Madagascar
- Region: Vatovavy
- District: Nosy Varika

Population (2018)
  - Total: 11,133
- Time zone: UTC3 (EAT)
- postal code: 319

Fanivelona is a rural commune in Madagascar. It belongs to the district of Nosy Varika, which is a part of the region Vatovavy. The population of the commune was 11,133 in 2018.
