= Vanguard =

Leading part of a military formation

The vanguard (sometimes abbreviated to van and also called the advance guard) is the leading part of an advancing military formation. It has a number of functions, including seeking out the enemy and securing ground in advance of the main force.

In naval warfare the van is the advance ship, or fleet, that will make the initial engagement with an enemy fleet.

== History ==
The vanguard derives from the traditional division of a medieval army into three battles or wards; the van, the main (or middle), and the rear. The term originated from the medieval French avant-garde, i.e. "the advance guard". The vanguard would lead the line of march and would deploy first on the field of battle, either in front of the other wards or to the right if they deployed in line.

The makeup of the vanguard of a 15th century Burgundian army is a typical example. This consisted of:

- A contingent of foreriders, from whom a forward detachment of scouts was drawn;
- The main body of the vanguard, accompanied by civil officials and trumpeters to carry messages and summon enemy towns and castles to surrender; and
- A body of workmen under the direction of the Master of Artillery whose job it was to clear obstacles which would obstruct the baggage and artillery travelling with the main army.

In an English force of the period, the foreriders of the vanguard would be accompanied by the harbingers, whose job was to locate lodgings for the army for the following night.

In modern times, the word can also be referred to as a group of people leading the way in new developments or ideas.

=== Forward detachments ===
During World War II, the Red Army began forming ad hoc vanguard formations called "forward detachments" (peredovye otriady), from army, corps and divisional units. Forward detachments brought together the mobile (motorized or mechanized) elements of the parent formation to play an exploitation role once a breakthrough of the German lines occurred. A rifle division, for example, might mount one or two battalions of infantry on trucks, with motorized antitank guns and motorized artillery in support.

== See also ==
- Vanguardism, a political theory developed by Vladimir Lenin
- Forlorn hope
- Rearguard
