= Vohitrandriana =

- Location in Madagascar
- Coordinates: 20°45′S 48°16′E
- Country: Madagascar
- Region: Vatovavy
- District: Nosy Varika
- Elevation: 121 m (397 ft)

Population (2001)
  - Total: 31,000
- Time zone: UTC3 (EAT)

Vohitrandriana is a rural commune in Madagascar. It belongs to the district of Nosy Varika, which is a part of Vatovavy. The population of the commune was estimated to be approximately 31,000 in 2001 commune census.

== Geography ==
It's situated at the Fanantara River, where there are also gold mining operations. Vohitrandriana is served by a local airport. Primary and junior level secondary education are available in town. The majority 95% of the population of the commune are farmers. The most important crop is rice, while other important products are coffee and cassava. Services provide employment for 5% of the population.
