= Antanandava, Ambatondrazaka =

Antanandava
- Location in Madagascar
- Coordinates: 17°29′S 48°41′E
- Country: Madagascar
- Region: Alaotra-Mangoro
- District: Moramanga

Area
  - Total: 1,800 km^{2} (690 sq mi)
- Elevation: 1,064 m (3,491 ft)

Population (2018)
  - Total: 11,013
- Time zone: UTC3 (EAT)
- Postal code: 503

Antanandava is a rural commune in Madagascar. It belongs to the district of Ambatondrazaka, which is a part of Alaotra-Mangoro Region. The population of the commune was 11,013 in 2018.

== Economy ==
The economy of the commune is based on agriculture. Rice, corn, beans, manioc, arachide and tobacco are the mostly grown products.

Situated close to the commune is the Zahamena National Park.
