= Ambahy =

- Location in Madagascar
- Coordinates: 20°46′S 48°29′E
- Country: Madagascar
- Region: Vatovavy
- District: Nosy Varika
- Elevation: 12 m (39 ft)

Population (2018)
  - Total: 10,469
- Time zone: UTC3 (EAT)
- postal code: 319

Ambahy is a rural commune in Madagascar. It belongs to the district of Nosy Varika, which is a part of the region Vatovavy. The population of the commune was 10,469 in 2018.
