= Andromba =

- Location in Madagascar
- Coordinates: 17°24′S 48°38′E
- Country: Madagascar
- Region: Alaotra-Mangoro
- District: Ambatondrazaka
- Elevation: 782 m (2,566 ft)

Population (2001)
  - Total: 3,000
- Time zone: UTC3 (EAT)

Andromba is a town and commune (Malagasy: kaominina) in Madagascar. It belongs to the district of Ambatondrazaka, which is a part of Alaotra-Mangoro Region. The population of the commune was estimated to be approximately 3,000 in 2001 commune census.

Only primary schooling is available. The majority 52% of the population works in fishing. 42% are farmers, while an additional 6% receives their livelihood from raising livestock. The most important crops are rice and peanuts; also cassava is an important agricultural product.
