= Ambatondrazaka Suburbaine =

- Location in Madagascar
- Coordinates: 17°54′S 48°29′E
- Country: Madagascar
- Region: Alaotra-Mangoro
- District: Ambatondrazaka
- Elevation: 939 m (3,081 ft)

Population (2001)
  - Total: 20,000
- Time zone: UTC3 (EAT)

Ambatondrazaka Suburbaine is a town and rural commune (Malagasy: kaominina) in Madagascar. It located close to the town Ambatondrazaka and belongs to the district of Ambatondrazaka, which is a part of Alaotra-Mangoro Region. The population of the commune was estimated to be approximately 20,000 in 2001 commune census.

Only primary schooling is available. It is also a site of industrial-scale mining. The majority 82% of the population of the commune are farmers, while an additional 6% receives their livelihood from raising livestock. The most important crop is rice, while other important products are beans, maize and cassava. Industry and services provide employment for 0.5% and 3% of the population, respectively. Additionally fishing employs 8.5% of the population.
