= Feramanga Nord =

- Location in Madagascar
- Coordinates: 17°46′S 48°26′E
- Country: Madagascar
- Region: Alaotra-Mangoro
- District: Ambatondrazaka
- Elevation: 768 m (2,520 ft)

Population (2001)
  - Total: 10,000
- Time zone: UTC3 (EAT)

Feramanga Nord or Feramanga Avaratra is a town and commune (Malagasy: kaominina) in Madagascar. It belongs to the district of Ambatondrazaka, which is a part of Alaotra-Mangoro Region. The population of the commune was estimated to be approximately 10,000 in 2001 commune census.

Feramanga Nord is served by a local airport. Primary and junior level secondary education are available in town. The majority 75% of the population of the commune are farmers, while an additional 10% receives their livelihood from raising livestock. The most important crops are rice and tomato; also sweet potatoes is an important agricultural product. Services provide employment for 5% of the population. Additionally fishing employs 10% of the population.
