= Manakambahiny Est =

Manakambahiny Est Manakambahiny Atsinanana
- Location in Madagascar
- Coordinates: 17°51′S 48°46′E
- Country: Madagascar
- Region: Alaotra-Mangoro
- District: Ambatondrazaka
- Elevation: 1,106 m (3,629 ft)

Population (2001)
  - Total: 8,000
- Time zone: UTC3 (EAT)
- Postal code: 503

Manakambahiny Est is a municipality in Madagascar. It belongs to the district of Ambatondrazaka, which is a part of Alaotra-Mangoro Region. The population of the commune was estimated to be approximately 8,000 in 2001 commune census.

Primary and junior level secondary education are available in town. The majority 80% of the population of the commune are farmers, while an additional 18% receives their livelihood from raising livestock. The most important crop is rice, while other important products are bananas, sugarcane, cassava and sweet potatoes. Services provide employment for 2% of the population.

== National Parks ==
The entrance of the Zahamena National Park is situated at 4 km from Manakambahiny Est.
