= Nyer station =

Railway station in Nyer, France

Nyer
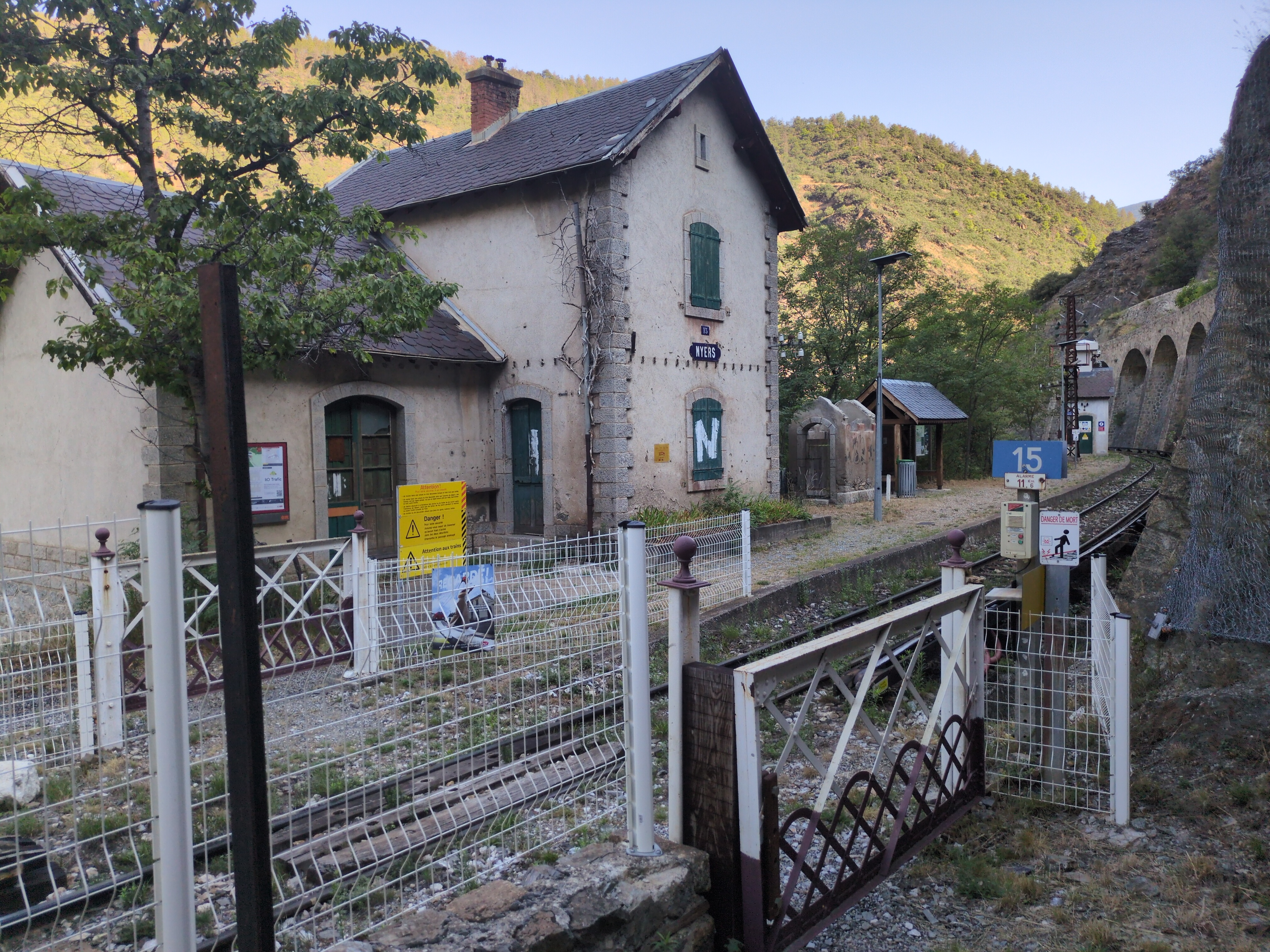

General information
- Location: Départementale D 57; 66360 Nyer; Pyrénées-Orientales; France
- Coordinates: 42.54167°N 2.263°E
- Line: Ligne de Cerdagne

Other information
- Station code: 87784736

History
- Opened: 18 July 1910

Services
Preceding station	TER Occitanie	Following station
Thuès-les-Bains towards Latour-de-Carol	32 (Ligne de Cerdagne)	Olette-Canaveilles-les-Bains towards Villefranche–Vernet-les-Bains
Location

Nyer station (French: Gare de Nyer) is a railway station in Nyer, Occitanie, southern France. Within TER Occitanie, it is part of line 32 (Latour-de-Carol-Enveitg–Villefranche-Vernet-les-Bains, Train Jaune).

== See also ==
- List of SNCF stations in Occitanie
