= Ambatosoratra =

- Location in Madagascar
- Coordinates: 17°37′S 48°31′E
- Country: Madagascar
- Region: Alaotra-Mangoro
- District: Ambatondrazaka
- Elevation: 800 m (2,600 ft)

Population (2001)
  - Total: 20,000
- Time zone: UTC3 (EAT)
- Climate: Cwa

Ambatosoratra is a town and commune (Malagasy: kaominina) in Madagascar. It belongs to the district of Ambatondrazaka, which is a part of Alaotra-Mangoro Region. The population of the commune was estimated to be approximately 20,000 in 2001 commune census.

Primary and junior level secondary education are available in town. Farming and raising livestock provides employment for 42% and 15% of the working population. The most important crops are rice and onions, while other important agricultural products are beans, cassava, sweet potatoes, and tomatoes. Industry and services provide employment for 1% and 17% of the population, respectively. Additionally, fishing employs 25% of the population.
