= Didy =

Rural location in Madagascar

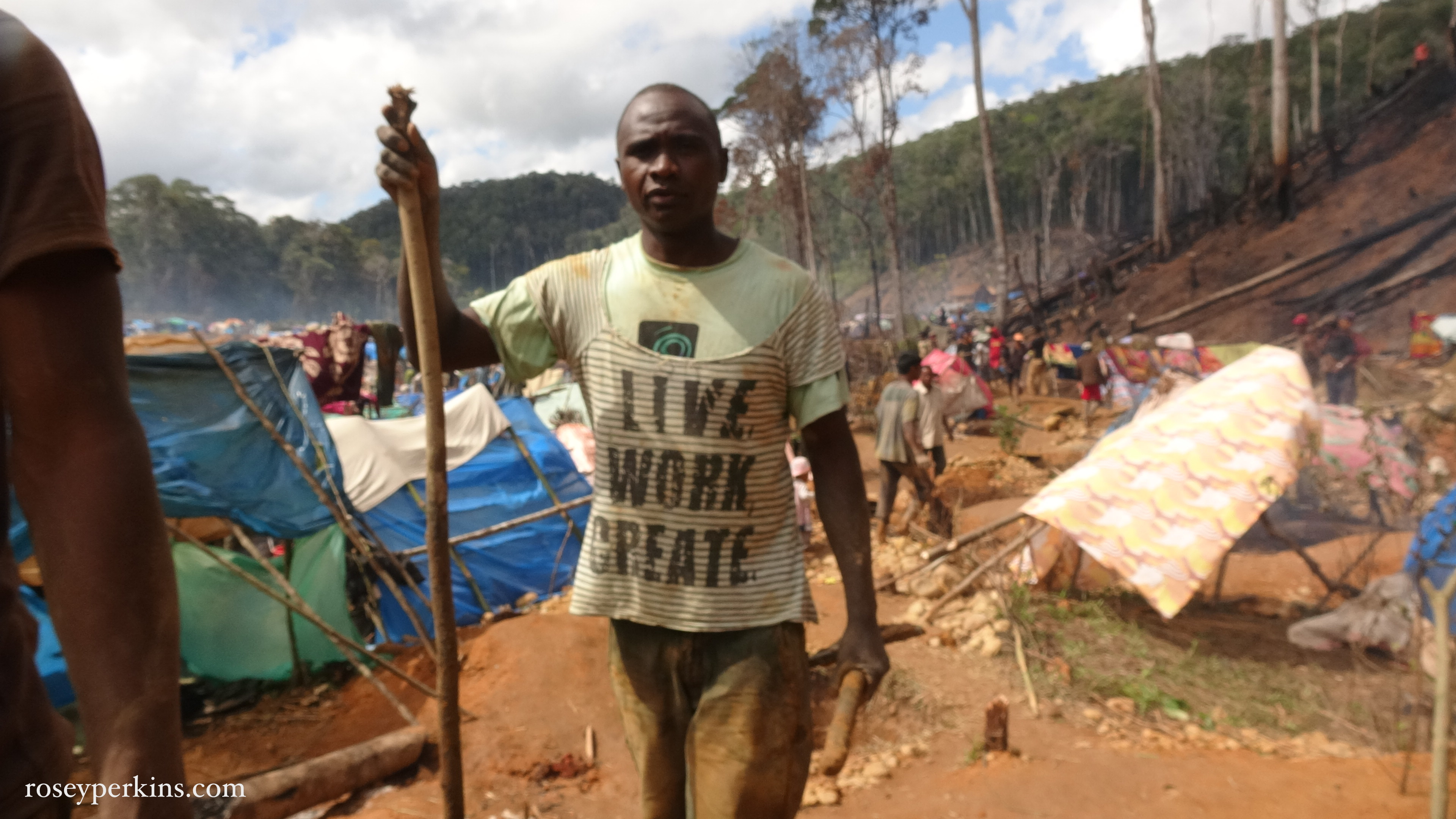
- Didy

- Location in Madagascar
- Coordinates: 18°7′S 48°32′E
- Country: Madagascar
- Region: Alaotra-Mangoro
- District: Ambatondrazaka

Government
  - Mayor: Davidson Radoka

Area
  - Total: 1,773.16 km^{2} (684.62 sq mi)
- Elevation: 1,034 m (3,392 ft)

Population (2018)
  - Total: 33,039
- Time zone: UTC3 (EAT)
- Postal code: 503

Didy is a rural commune in Madagascar. It belongs to the district of Ambatondrazaka, which is a part of Alaotra-Mangoro Region. The population of the commune was estimated to be 33,039 in 2018.

The town of Didy is situated at 54 km from Ambatondrazaka.

Only primary schooling is available. The majority 85% of the population of the commune are farmers, while an additional 14% receives their livelihood from raising livestock. The most important crop is rice, while other important products are maize, cassava and tomato. Services provide employment for 1% of the population.

== History ==
In the beginning of 2012, a sapphire and ruby rush occurred 25 kilometers south-east of Didy. The rush was due to the exceptional color, clarity and size of the precious stones found there.

Discovered in alluvium, in the core of a wild forest located in the Ankeniheny-Zahamena national park, sapphires and rubies required holes from 50 centimeters to 2 meters depth to be extracted.

Following the arrival of 40,000 people on the occurrence, the government evacuated the area in June 2012 and the access was denied.
