= Androrangovola =

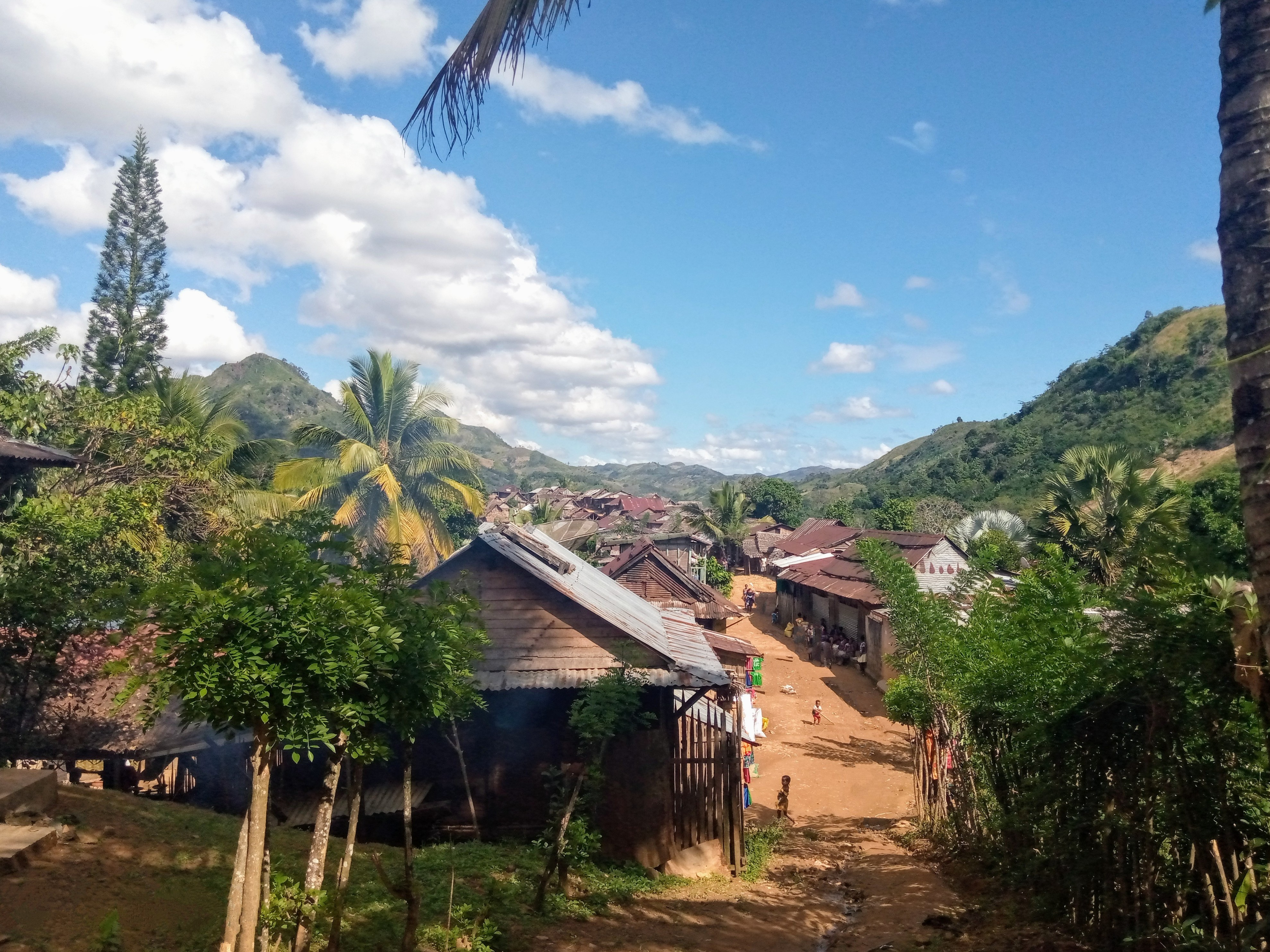
- Androrangavola

- Location in Madagascar
- Coordinates: 20°31′S 48°14′E
- Country: Madagascar
- Region: Vatovavy-Fitovinany
- District: Nosy Varika
- Elevation: 210 m (690 ft)

Population (2001)
  - Total: 16,000
- Time zone: UTC3 (EAT)

Androrangovola is a town and commune in Madagascar. It belongs to the district of Nosy Varika, which is a part of Vatovavy-Fitovinany Region. The population of the commune was estimated to be approximately 16,000 in 2001 commune census.

Only primary schooling is available. The majority of the population of the commune are farmers. The most important crops are coffee and pepper; also rice is an important agricultural product. Services provide employment for 1% of the population.
