= Antsangasanga =

- Location in Madagascar
- Coordinates: 17°50′S 48°17′E
- Country: Madagascar
- Region: Alaotra-Mangoro
- District: Ambatondrazaka
- Elevation: 770 m (2,530 ft)

Population (2001)
  - Total: 7,000
- Time zone: UTC3 (EAT)

Antsangasanga is a town and commune (Malagasy: kaominina) in Madagascar. It belongs to the district of Ambatondrazaka, which is a part of Alaotra-Mangoro Region. The population of the commune was estimated to be approximately 7,000 in 2001 commune census.

Only primary schooling is available. The majority 69.5% of the population of the commune are farmers, while an additional 30% receives their livelihood from raising livestock. The most important crop is rice, while other important products are beans, maize and cassava. Services provide employment for 0.5% of the population.
