= Amparihitsokatra =

- Location in Madagascar
- Coordinates: 17°31′S 48°34′E
- Country: Madagascar
- Region: Alaotra-Mangoro
- District: Ambatondrazaka
- Elevation: 841 m (2,759 ft)

Population (2001)
  - Total: 10,000
- Time zone: UTC3 (EAT)

Amparihitsokatra is a town and commune (Malagasy: kaominina) in Madagascar. It belongs to the district of Ambatondrazaka, which is a part of Alaotra-Mangoro Region. The population of the commune was estimated to be approximately 10,000 in 2001 commune census.

Only primary schooling is available. The majority 70% of the population of the commune are farmers. The most important crops are rice and peanuts, while other important agricultural products are maize and cassava. Additionally fishing employs 30% of the population.
