= Soavina Est =

- Location in Madagascar
- Coordinates: 20°23′S 48°18′E
- Country: Madagascar
- Region: Vatovavy
- District: Nosy Varika
- Elevation: 142 m (466 ft)

Population (2018)
  - Total: 33.352
- Time zone: UTC3 (EAT)
- Postal colde: 319

Soavina Est is a town and commune in Madagascar. It belongs to the district of Nosy Varika in the region of Vatovavy. The population of the commune was 33,352 in 2018.

Primary and junior level secondary education are available in town. The majority (99%) of the population of the commune are farmers. The most important crop is rice, while other important products are coffee, sugarcane and cassava. Services provide employment for 1% of the population.
