= Thuès-les-Bains station =

Railway station in Thuès-Entre-Valls, France

Thuès-les-Bains
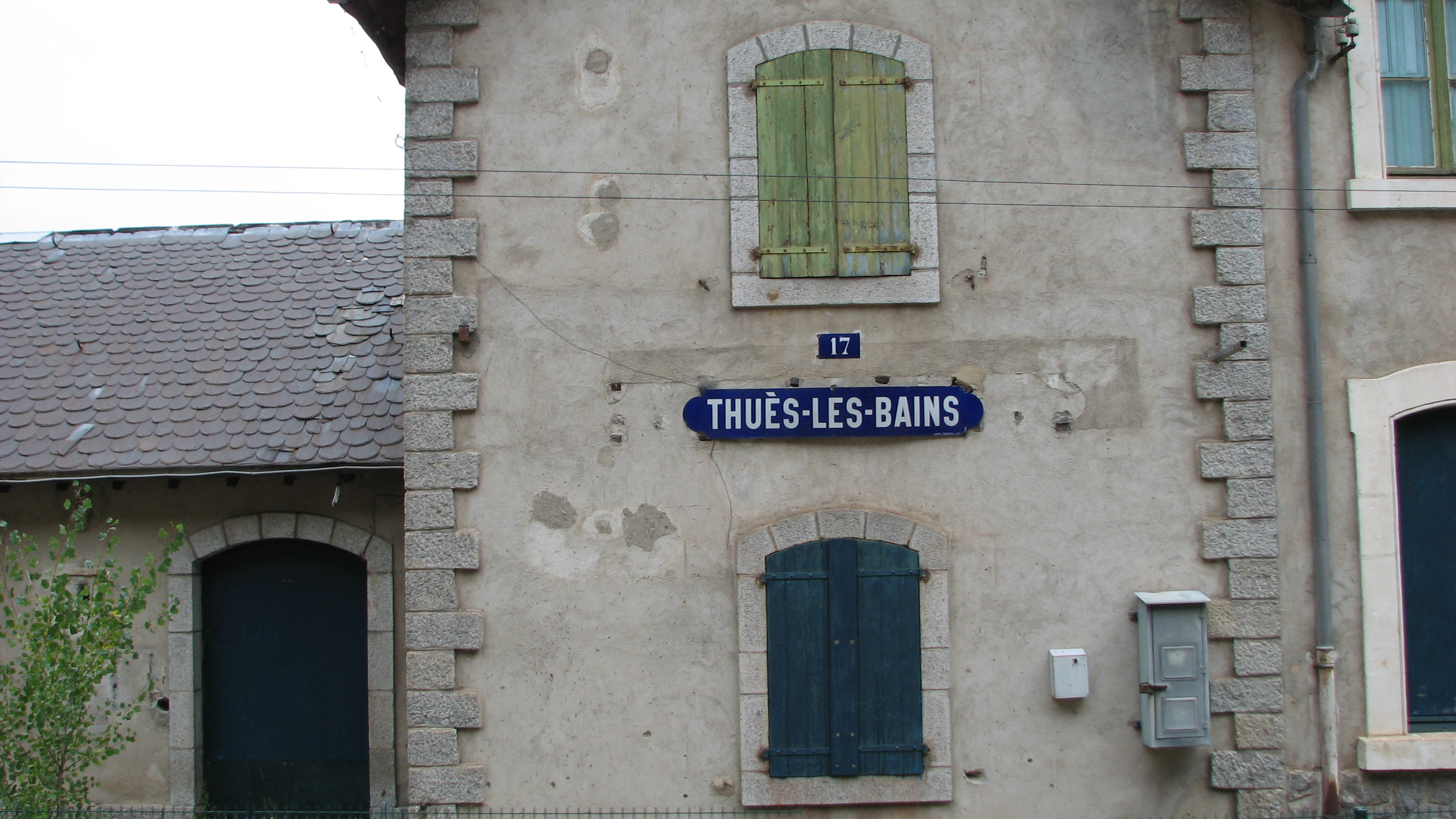
- Thuès-les-Bains Station

General information
- Location: Thuès-les-Bains, Nyer, Occitanie, France
- Coordinates: 42.528979°N 2.249015°E
- Line: Ligne de Cerdagne

Other information
- Station code: 87784744

History
- Opened: 1910

Services
Preceding station	TER Occitanie	Following station
Thuès-Carança towards Latour-de-Carol	32 (Ligne de Cerdagne)	Nyer towards Villefranche–Vernet-les-Bains
Location

Thuès-les-Bains station (French: Gare de Thuès-les-Bains) is a railway station in Nyer, Occitanie, southern France. Within TER Occitanie, it is part of line 32 (Latour-de-Carol-Enveitg–Villefranche-Vernet-les-Bains, Train Jaune).
