= Vohindroa =

- Interactive map of Vohindroa
- Country: Madagascar
- Region: Vatovavy-Fitovinany
- District: Nosy Varika

Population (2001)
  - Total: 17,000
- Time zone: UTC3 (EAT)

Vohindroa is a town and commune in Madagascar. It belongs to the district of Nosy Varika, which is a part of Vatovavy-Fitovinany Region. The population of the commune was estimated to be approximately 17,000 in 2001 commune census.

Only primary schooling is available. The majority 99% of the population of the commune are farmers. The most important crop is coffee, while other important products are sugarcane, cassava and rice. Services provide employment for 1% of the population.
