= Lusignan, Vienne =

Lusignan
- Commune
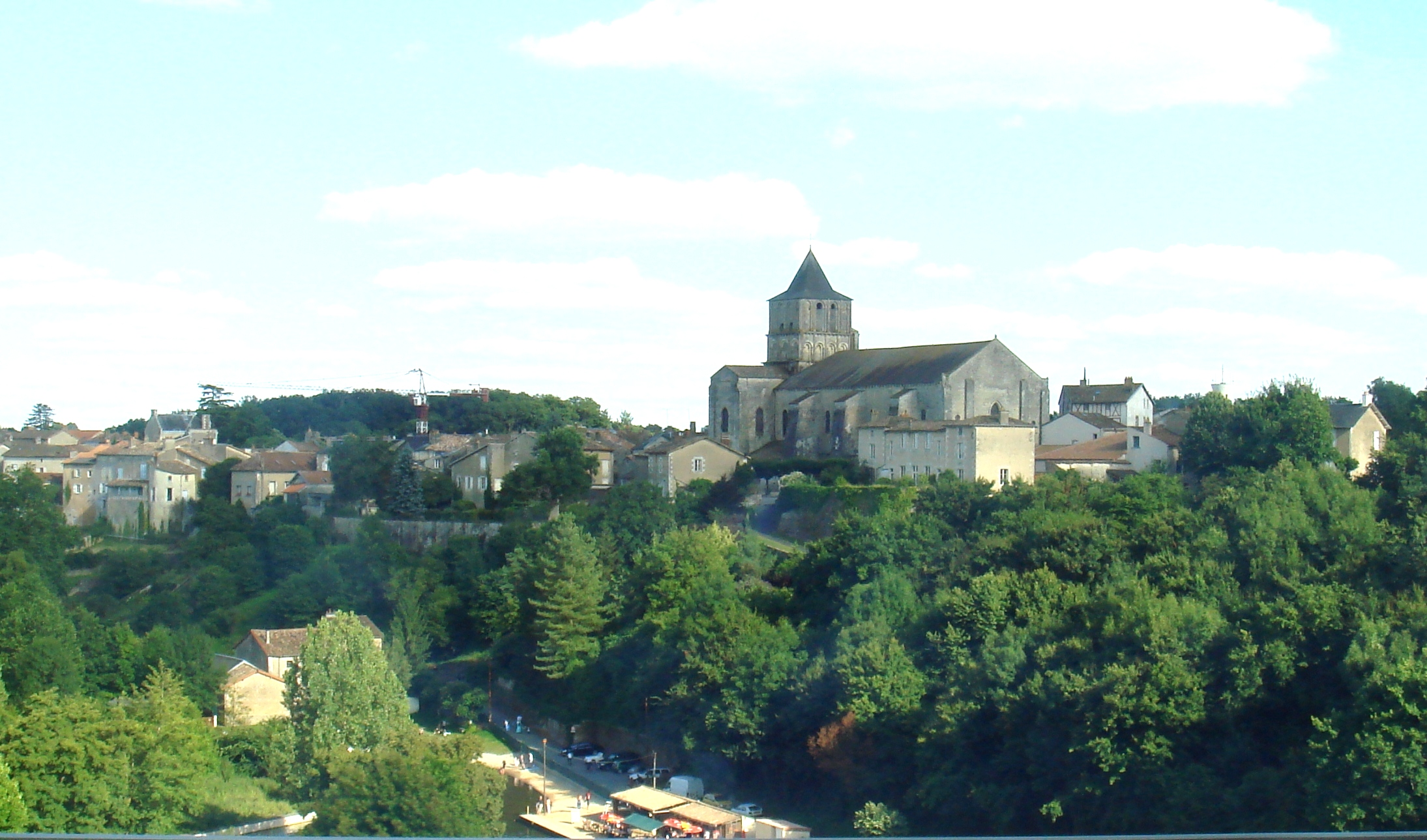
- A general view of Lusignan

- Coat of arms
- Location of Lusignan
- Location within France Location within Nouvelle-Aquitaine
- Coordinates: 46°26′08″N 0°07′25″E
- Country: France
- Region: Nouvelle-Aquitaine
- Department: Vienne
- Arrondissement: Poitiers
- Canton: Lusignan
- Intercommunality: CU Grand Poitiers

Government
  - Mayor (2020–2026): Jean-Louis Ledeux
- Area^{1}: 37.82 km^{2} (14.60 sq mi)
- Elevation: 132 m (433 ft)
- Highest elevation: 159 m (522 ft)
- Lowest elevation: 99 m (325 ft)
- Population (2023): 2,544
  - Density: 67.27/km^{2} (174.2/sq mi)
- Time zone: UTC+01:00 (CET)
  - Summer (DST): UTC+02:00 (CEST)
- INSEE/Postal code: 86139 /86600
- ^{1} French Land Register data, which excludes lakes, ponds, glaciers > 1 km^{2} (0.386 sq mi or 247 acres) and river estuaries.

Lusignan (French pronunciation: [lyziɲɑ̃]) is a commune in the Vienne department in the Nouvelle-Aquitaine region in western France. It lies 25 km southwest of Poitiers. The inhabitants are called Mélusins and Mélusines.

== Geography ==
The town of Lusignan has about 3,000 inhabitants. It is located on the road RN11 from Poitiers to La Rochelle. It is about 400 km (250 mi) from Paris. It belongs to the Poitiers arrondissement and the Lusignan canton.

Right north of the town flows the river Vonne, a tributary of the Clain.

== History ==
Between the 10th and 14th centuries, the history of the town fully overlaps with that of the House of Lusignan.

During the 16th century Lusignan is repeatedly involved in the French Wars of Religion between Huguenots and Catholics.

The city walls were dismantled by royal orders in the 17th century.

== Population ==
Historical population
Year	Pop.	±% p.a.
1968	2,564	—
1975	2,777	+1.15%
1982	2,855	+0.40%
1990	2,749	−0.47%
1999	2,677	−0.29%
2007	2,637	−0.19%
2012	2,631	−0.05%
2017	2,649	+0.14%
2023	2,544	−0.67%
Source: INSEE

== Monuments ==
- Château de Lusignan – historical castle of which only very scant remains are left after being long used as a quarry and then fully dismantled in the 18th century

== Personalities ==
- House of Lusignan
- Jacques Babinet – scientist
- André Léo (1824–1900) (real name Léodile Béra) – female writer

== Gallery ==
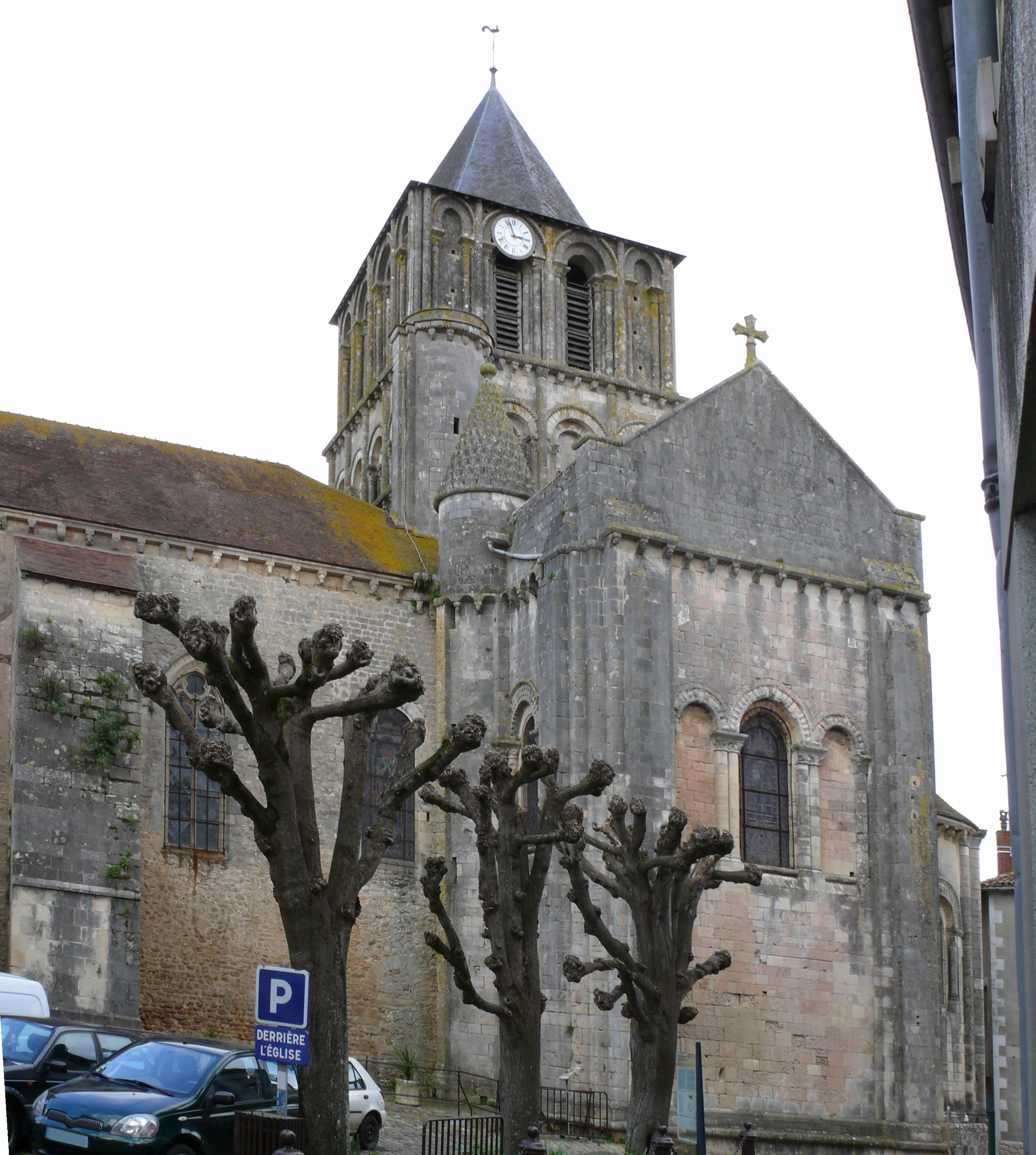
Church

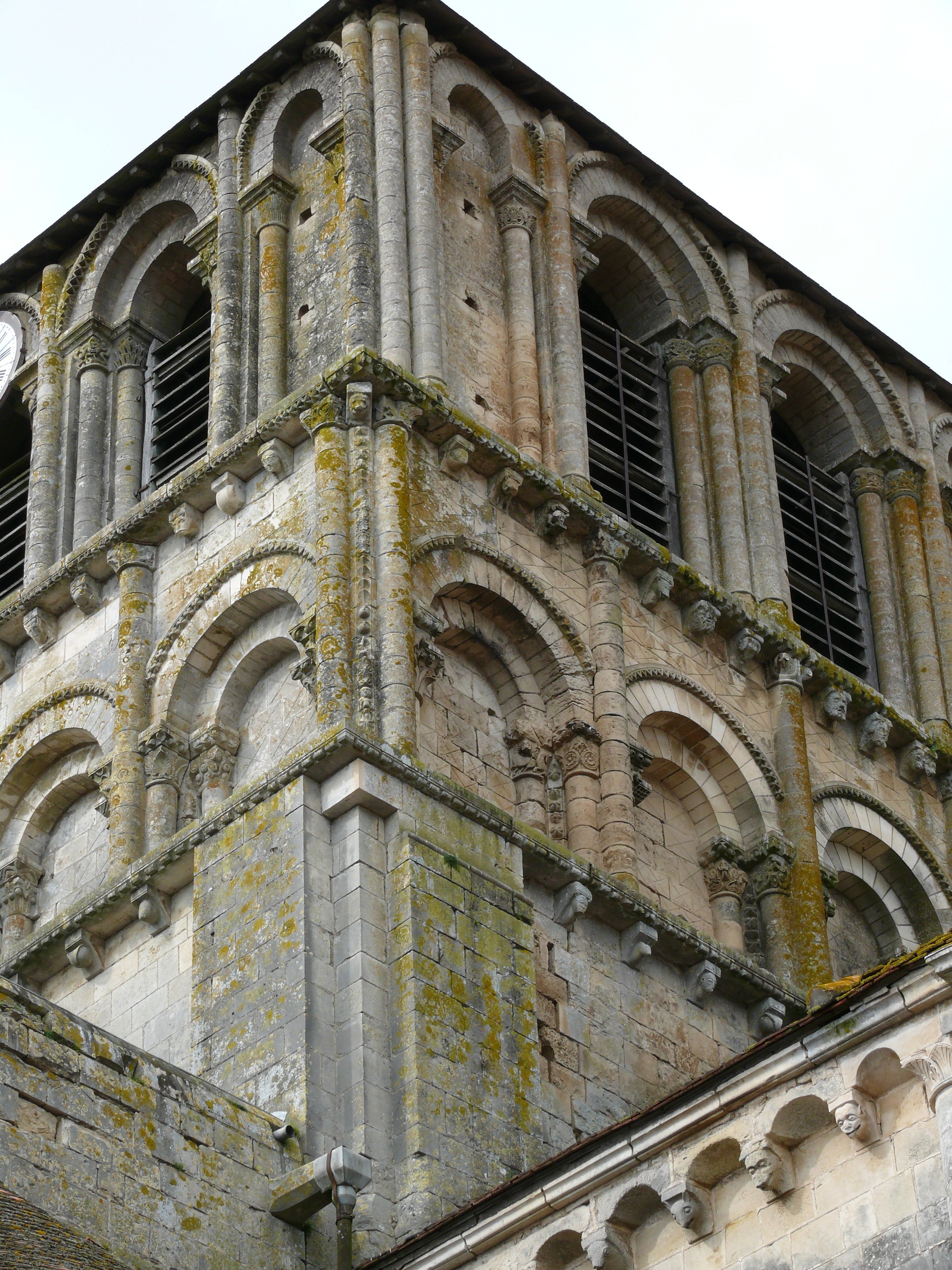
Church (detail)

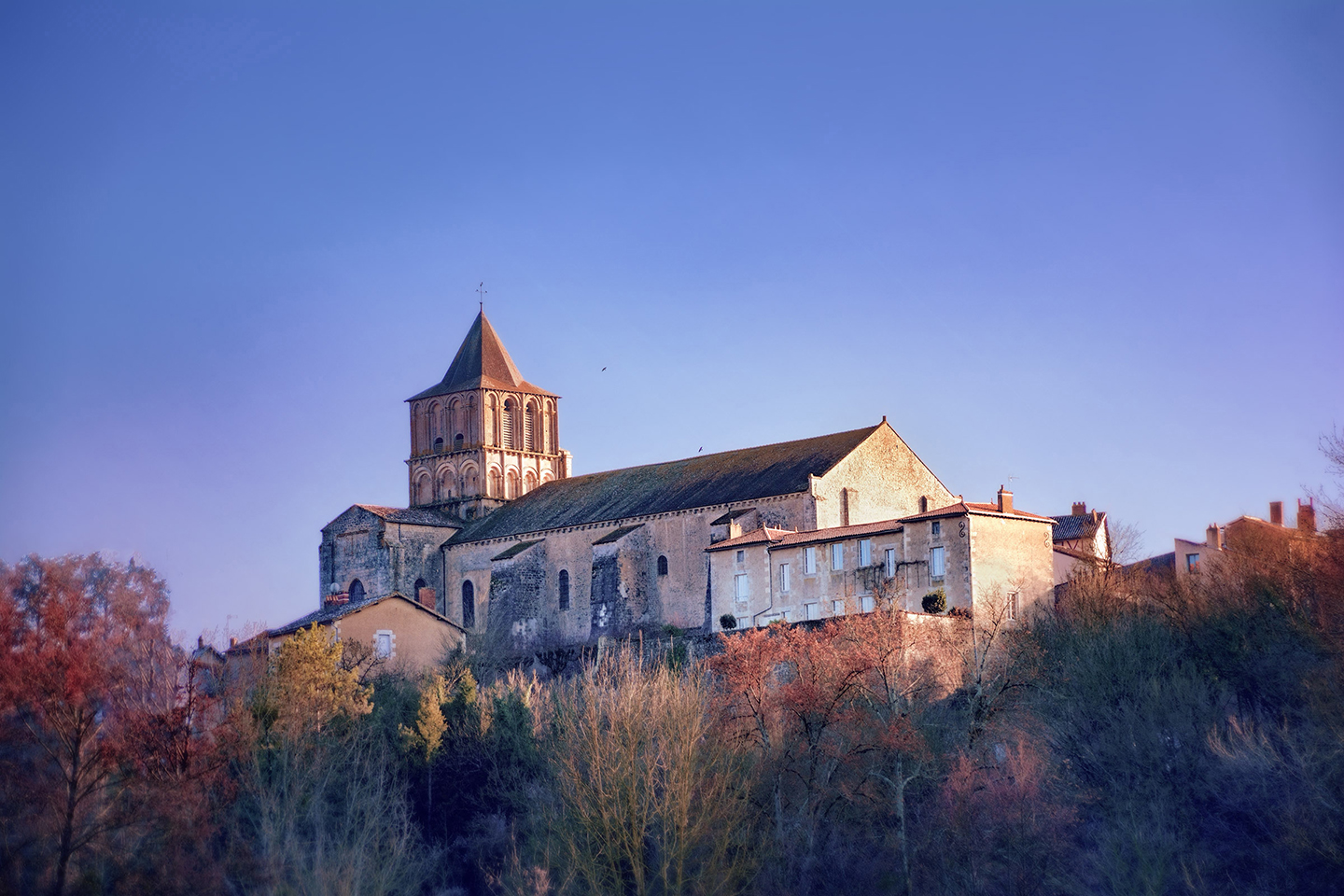
Church

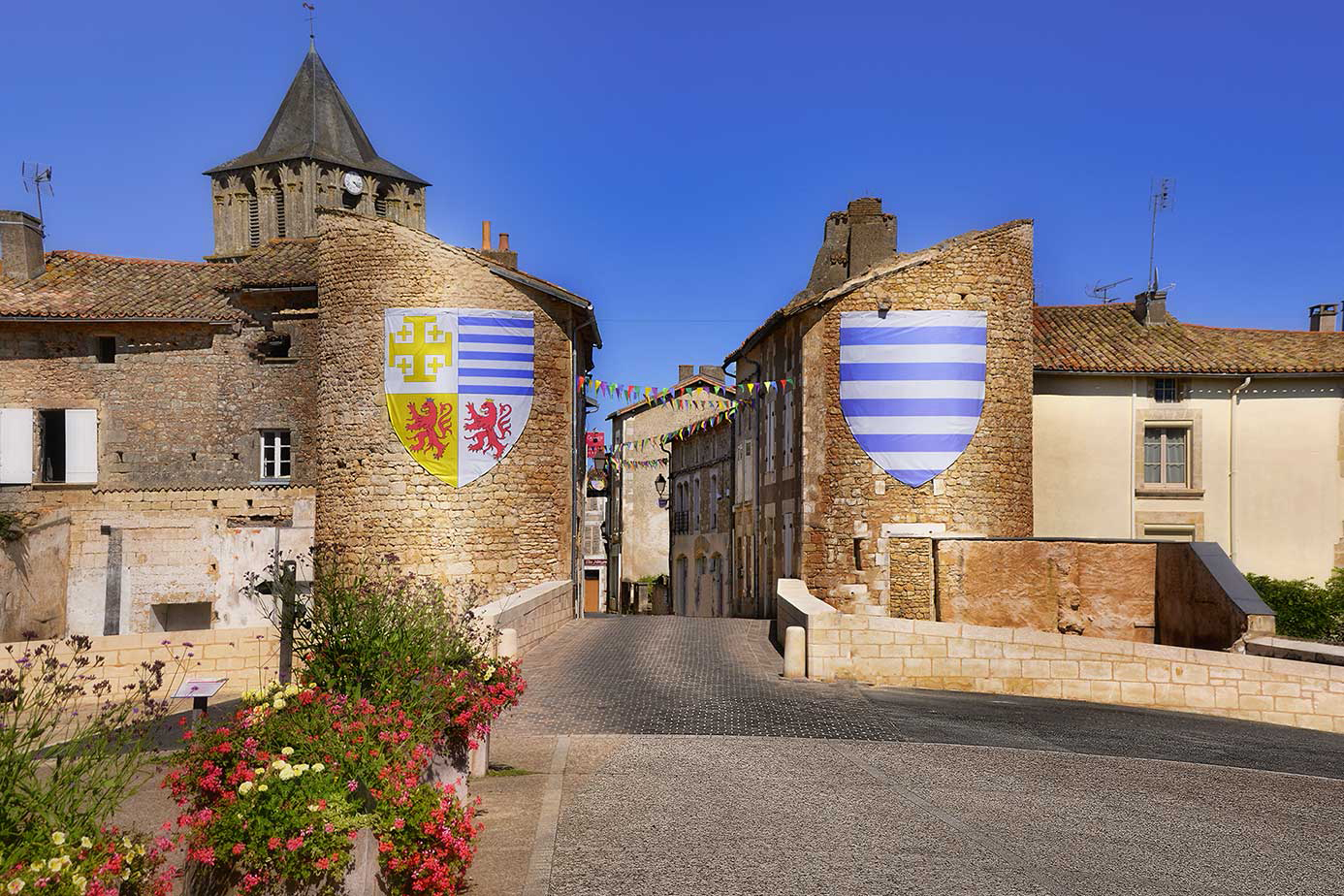
Fortress

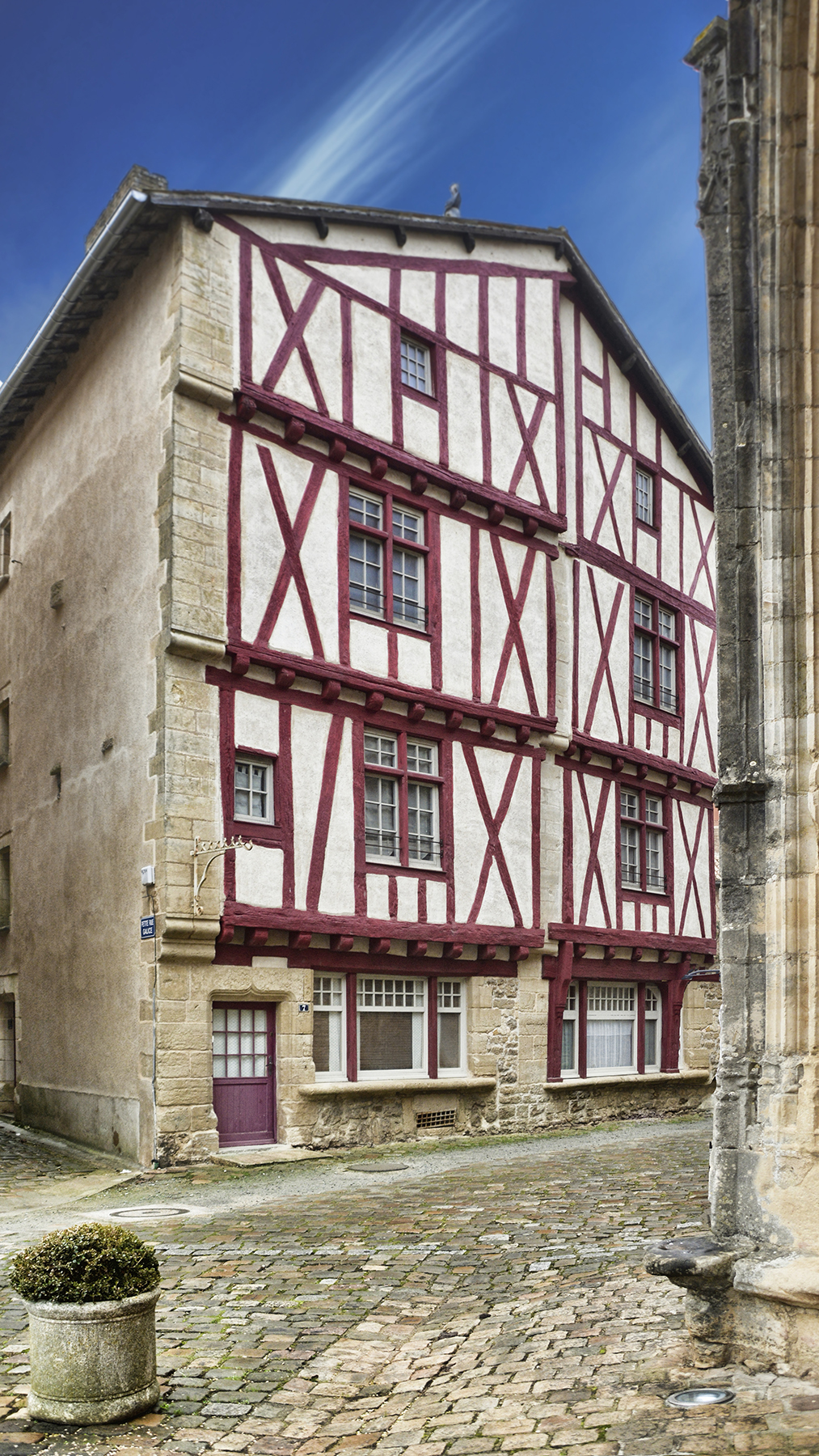
XV century house

== See also ==
- Communes of the Vienne department
- Lazanias
