= Nyer =

- Commune
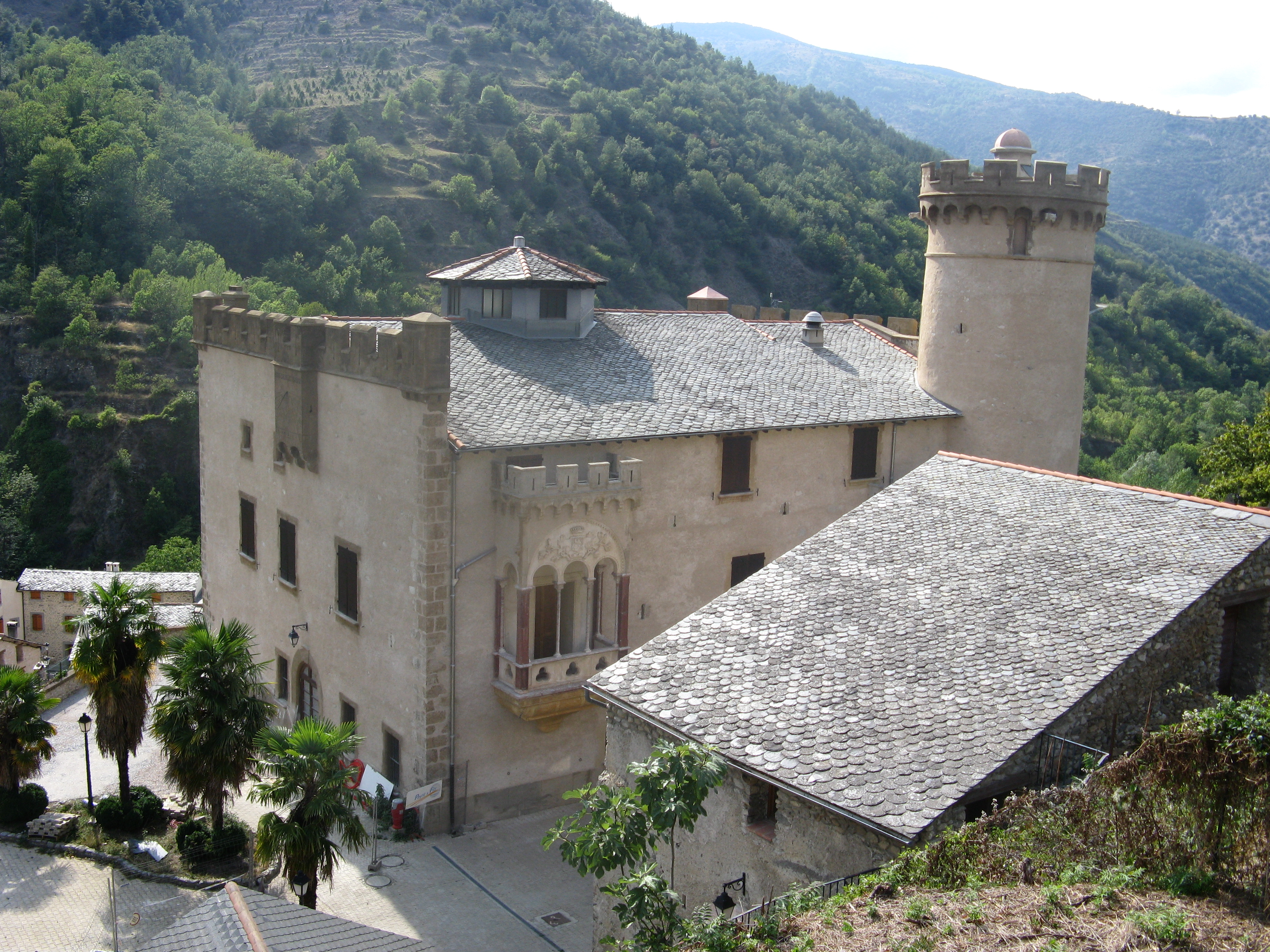
- The château in Nyer

- Coat of arms
- Location of Nyer
- Location within France Location within Occitanie
- Coordinates: 42°32′04″N 2°16′36″E
- Country: France
- Region: Occitania
- Department: Pyrénées-Orientales
- Arrondissement: Prades
- Canton: Les Pyrénées catalanes

Government
  - Mayor (2020–2026): André Argilès
- Area^{1}: 37.00 km^{2} (14.29 sq mi)
- Elevation: 734 m (2,408 ft)
- Highest elevation: 2,645 m (8,678 ft)
- Lowest elevation: 656 m (2,152 ft)
- Population (2023): 148
  - Density: 4.00/km^{2} (10.4/sq mi)
- Time zone: UTC+01:00 (CET)
  - Summer (DST): UTC+02:00 (CEST)
- INSEE/Postal code: 66123 /66360
- ^{1} French Land Register data, which excludes lakes, ponds, glaciers > 1 km^{2} (0.386 sq mi or 247 acres) and river estuaries.

Nyer (French pronunciation: [ɲɛʁ]; Catalan: Nyer) is a commune in the Pyrénées-Orientales department in southern France.

== Geography ==
Nyer is located in the canton of Les Pyrénées catalanes and in the arrondissement of Prades. Nyer station and Thuès-les-Bains station have rail connections to Villefranche-de-Conflent and Latour-de-Carol.

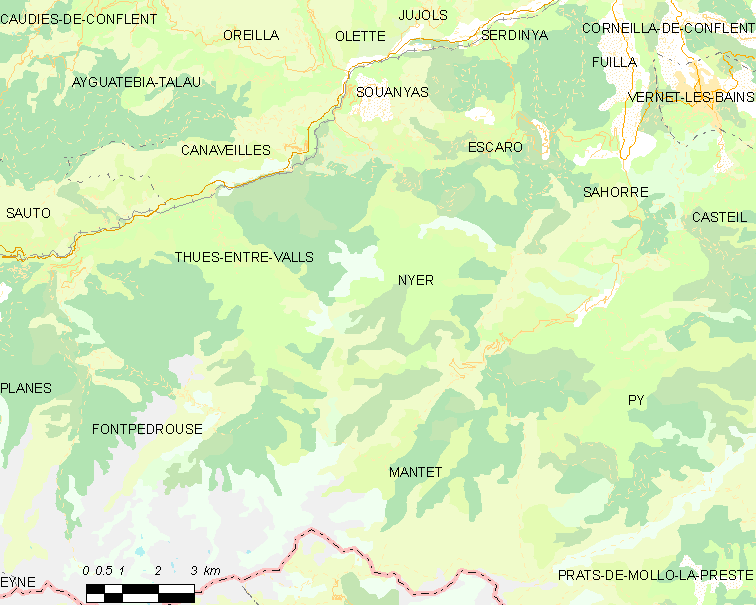
Map of Nyer and its surrounding communes

== Population ==
Historical population
Year	Pop.	±% p.a.
1968	137	—
1975	112	−2.84%
1982	140	+3.24%
1990	132	−0.73%
1999	108	−2.21%
2007	178	+6.44%
2012	160	−2.11%
2017	148	−1.55%
2023	148	+0.00%
Source: INSEE

== See also ==
- Communes of the Pyrénées-Orientales department
- Monastery of Saint-André d'Eixalada
