= Befody =

- Location in Madagascar
- Coordinates: 20°46′S 47°56′E
- Country: Madagascar
- Region: Vatovavy-Fitovinany
- District: Nosy Varika
- Elevation: 466 m (1,529 ft)

Population (2001)
  - Total: 12,000
- Time zone: UTC3 (EAT)

Befody is a town and commune in Madagascar. It belongs to the district of Nosy Varika, which is a part of Vatovavy-Fitovinany Region. The population of the commune was estimated to be approximately 12,000 in 2001 commune census.

Only primary schooling is available. The majority 99% of the population of the commune are farmers. The most important crop is rice, while other important products are coffee, beans and cassava. Services provide employment for 1% of the population.
