= Sakaleona River =

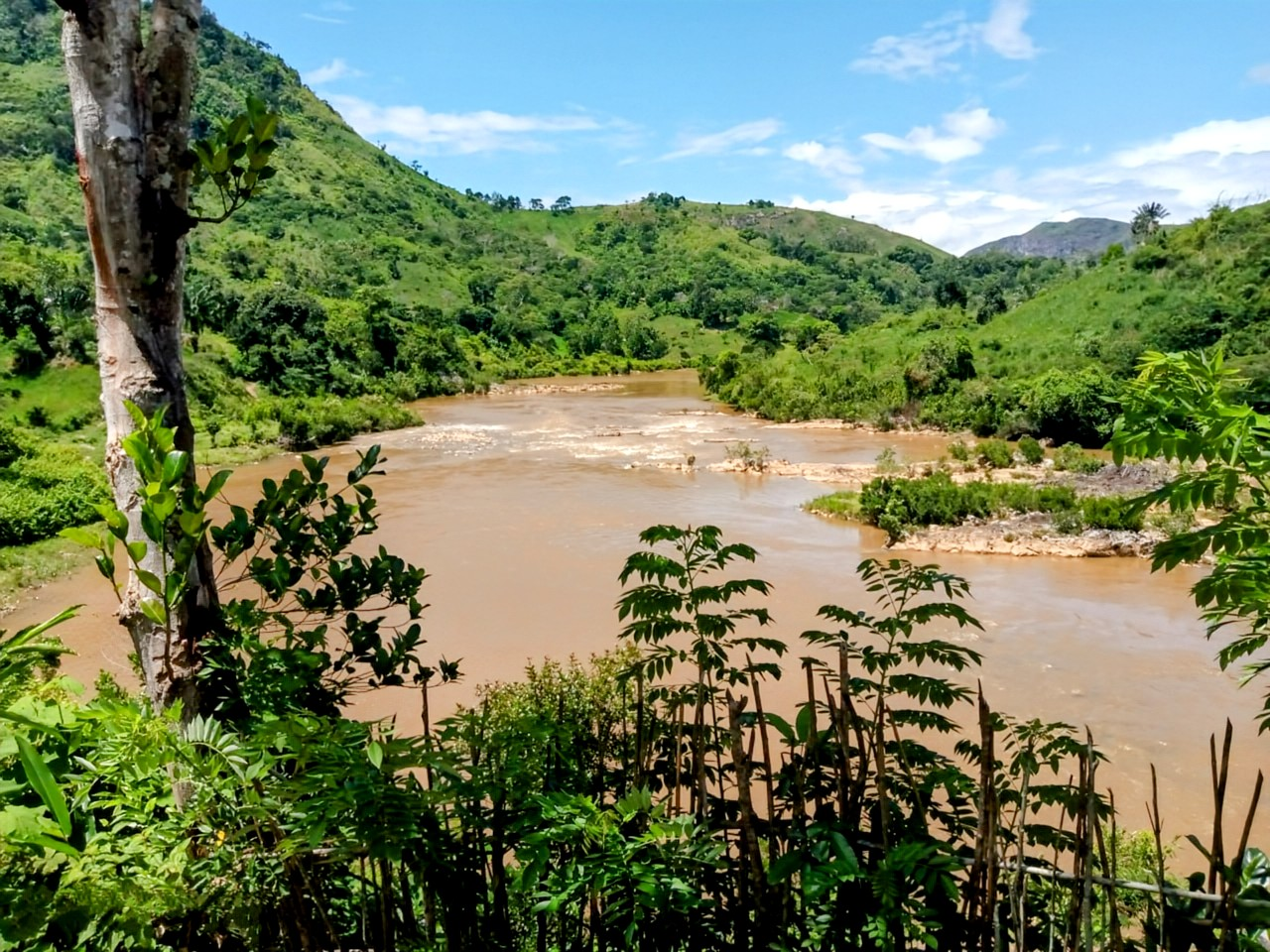

- Map of Malagasy rivers (Sakaleona flows from the central highlands to the Indian Ocean).

Location
- Country: Madagascar
- Region: Amoron'i Mania, Vatovavy

Physical characteristics
- Source
  - location: near Ambositra, Amoron'i Mania
- Mouth
  - location: Nosy Varika, Vatovavy
  - coordinates: 20°34′01″S 48°32′44″E
- Basin size: 2314.2 km2

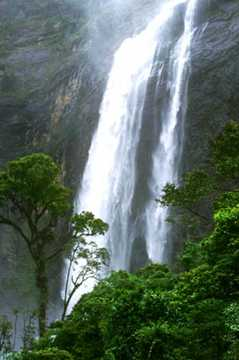
Sakaleona Falls

Sakaleona is a river in the regions of Amoron'i Mania and Vatovavy in eastern Madagascar. It flows down from the central highlands to flow into the Indian Ocean near Nosy Varika.

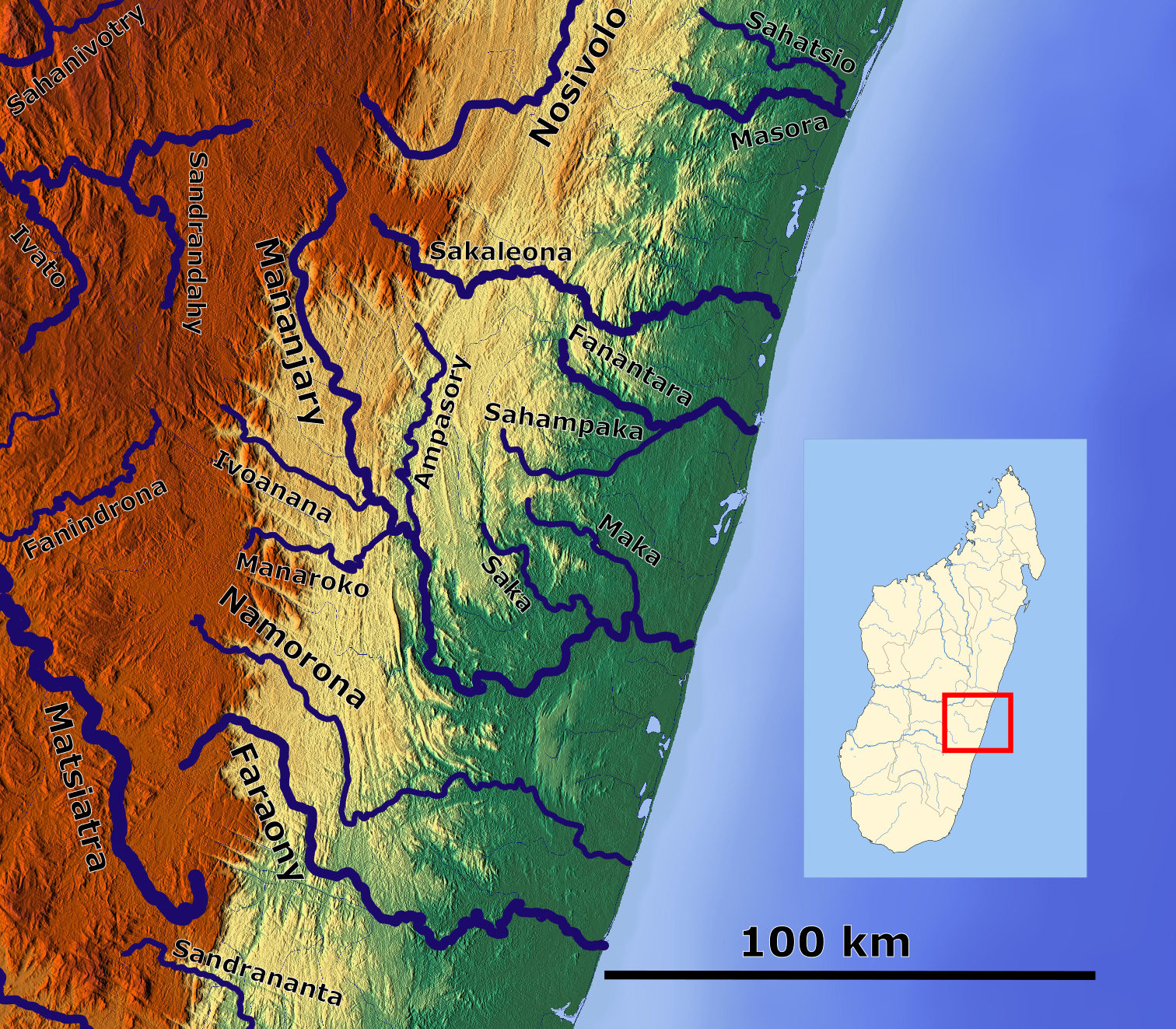
Sakaleona river

== See also ==
Sakaleona Falls
