= Sahavato =

Sahavato Alavakianja Sahavato
- Location in Madagascar
- Coordinates: 20°36′S 48°20′E
- Country: Madagascar
- Region: Vatovavy-Fitovinany
- District: Nosy Varika
- Elevation: 58 m (190 ft)

Population (2001)
  - Total: 28,000
- Time zone: UTC3 (EAT)

Sahavato is a town and commune in Madagascar. It belongs to the district of Nosy Varika, which is a part of Vatovavy-Fitovinany Region. The population of the commune was estimated to be approximately 28,000 in 2001 commune census.

Sahavato has a riverine harbour. Primary and junior level secondary education are available in town. The majority 90% of the population of the commune are farmers. The most important crop is coffee, while other important products are cassava and rice. Services provide employment for 10% of the population.
