= Sakaleona Falls =

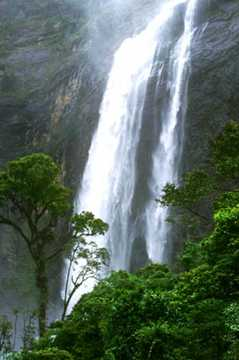

- Location within Madagascar
- Location: Ampasinambo, Vatovavy, Madagascar
- Coordinates: 20°31′38″S 47°59′47″E
- Total height: 200 m (660 ft)
- Watercourse: Sakaleona river

The Sakaleona Falls are the highest waterfalls of Madagascar, with a height of 200 metres (660 ft).

They are situated on the Sakaleona River in the Vatovavy region, some 18 kilometres (11 mi) from the village of Ampasinambo and about 107 kilometres (66 mi) from Nosy Varika.

== See also ==
- List of waterfalls
