= Ambatondrazaka District =

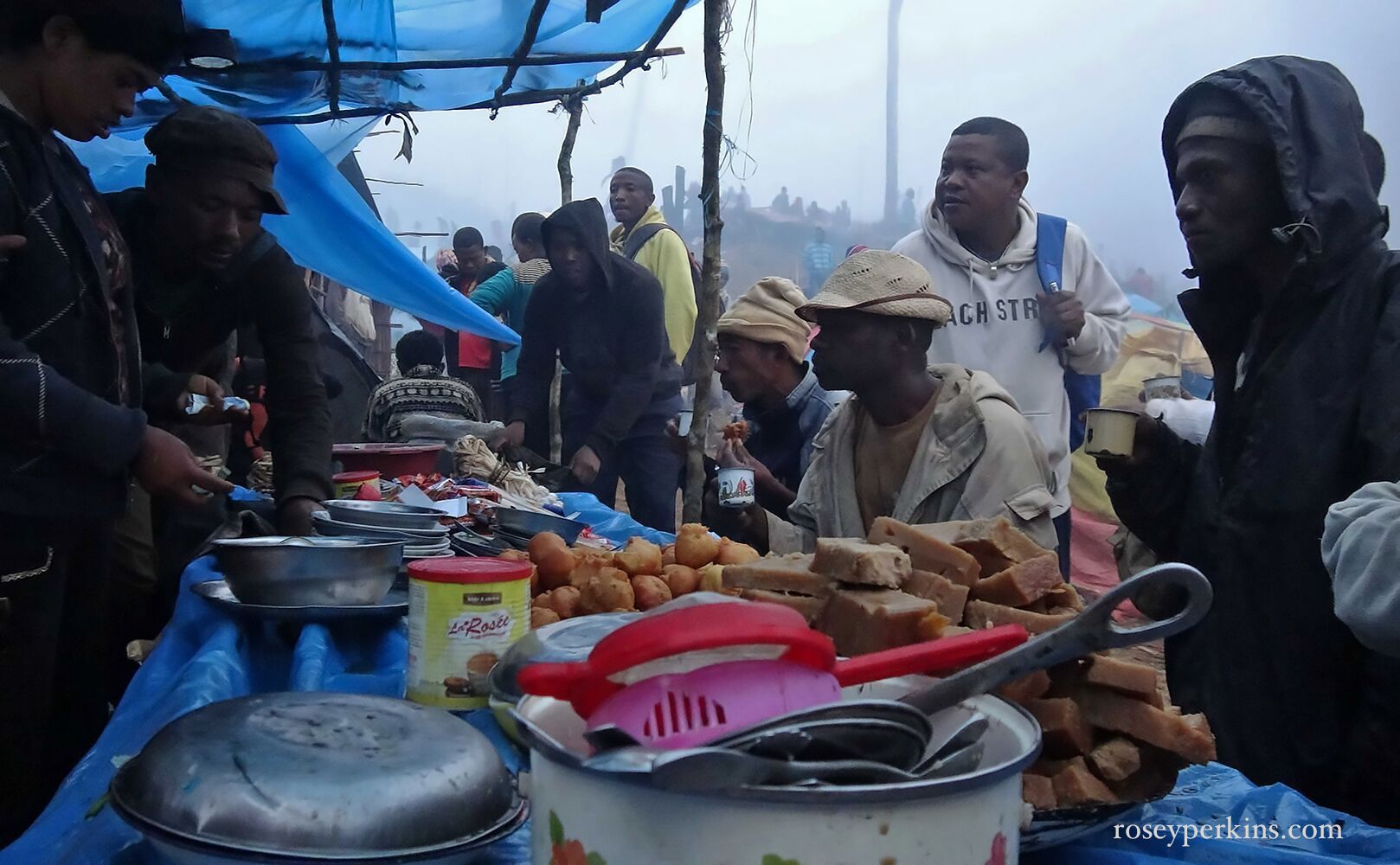
- Ambatondrazaka

- Location in Madagascar
- Coordinates: 17°50′0″S 48°25′0″E
- Country: Madagascar
- Region: Alaotra-Mangoro
- District: Ambatondrazaka

Area
  - Total: 6,967 km^{2} (2,690 sq mi)

Population (2020)
  - Total: 375,183
  - Density: 53.85/km^{2} (139.5/sq mi)
- Climate: Cwa

Ambatondrazaka District is a district in the Alaotra-Mangoro Region of Madagascar. Its capital is the town of Ambatondrazaka. The district has an area of 6,967 km^{2} (2,690 sq mi), and the estimated population in 2020 was 375,183.

== Geography ==
The district is situated east of Alaotra, the greatest lake in Madagascar.

== Religion ==
- FJKM - Fiangonan'i Jesoa Kristy eto Madagasikara (Church of Jesus Christ in Madagascar)
- FLM - Fiangonana Loterana Malagasy (Malagasy Lutheran Church)
- Roman Catholic Diocese of Ambatondrazaka (Cathedral of the Holy Trinity).

== Transport ==
The district is linked to Moramanga by the MLA (Moramanga–Lac Alaotra) railway and the Route nationale 44 (Moramanga–Ambatondrazaka–Imerimandroso–Amboavory). There is also an airport in Ambatondrazaka.

== Communes ==
The district is further divided into 20 communes:

- Ambandrika
- Ambatondrazaka Suburbaine
- Ambatondrazaka
- Ambatosoratra
- Ambohitsilaozana
- Amparihitsokatra
- Ampitatsimo
- Andilanatoby
- Andromba
- Antanandava
- Antsangasanga
- Bejofo
- Didy
- Feramanga Nord
- Ilafy
- Imerimandroso
- Manakambahiny Est
- Manakambahiny Ouest
- Soalazaina
- Tanambao Besakay

== Protected areas ==
- Part of the Ankeniheny-Zahamena Corridor, a natural resources reserve
- Part of Alaotra lake protected harmonious landscape
- Ampananganandehibe-Behasina protected harmonious landscape
- Analabe Betanatanana natural resources reserve
- Analalava natural resources reserve
- Mahialambo protected harmonious landscape
- Part of Zahamena national park
