= Tanambao Besakay =

- Location in Madagascar
- Coordinates: 18°9′S 48°6′E
- Country: Madagascar
- Region: Alaotra-Mangoro
- District: Ambatondrazaka
- Elevation: 1,018 m (3,340 ft)

Population (2001)
  - Total: 10,000
- Time zone: UTC3 (EAT)

Tanambao Besakay is a town and commune (Malagasy: kaominina) in Madagascar. It belongs to the district of Ambatondrazaka, which is a part of Alaotra-Mangoro Region. The population of the commune was estimated to be approximately 10,000 in 2001 commune census.

Only primary schooling is available. The majority 94% of the population of the commune are farmers, while an additional 5% receives their livelihood from raising livestock. The most important crop is rice, while other important products are peanuts, beans and cassava. Services provide employment for 1% of the population.
