= Ambandrika =

- Location in Madagascar
- Coordinates: 17°46′S 48°26′E
- Country: Madagascar
- Region: Alaotra-Mangoro
- District: Ambatondrazaka
- Established: 1996
- Elevation: 768 m (2,520 ft)

Population (2001)
  - Total: 7,000
- Time zone: UTC3 (EAT)
- Climate: Cwa

Ambandrika is a town and commune (Malagasy: kaominina) in Madagascar. It belongs to the district of Ambatondrazaka, which is a part of Alaotra-Mangoro Region. The population of the town was estimated to be approximately 7000 in 2001 commune census.

Only primary schooling is available. The majority 88% of the population of the commune are farmers, while an additional 3% receives their livelihood from raising livestock. The most important crop is rice, while other important products are beans, maize and tomato. Services provide employment for 6% of the population. Additionally fishing employs 3% of the population.

The commune is crossed by the Namontana river.
