= Jean I Le Maingre =

French noble (c. 1310–1367)

- Arms: Argent, a two-headed eagle gules, beaked, langured and membered azure
- Died: 15 March 1367; Dijon, France
- Resting place: Basilica of Saint Martin, Tours; 47°23′35″N 0°40′58″E
- Other name: Boucicaut
- Children: Jean II Le Maingre; Geoffrey Le Maingre

Jean I Le Maingre, also called Boucicaut (c. 1310 – 15 March 1367), Marshal of France, was a 14th century French noble.

== Life ==
In June 1340, Maingre accompanied the expedition of John, Duke of Normandy at the head of an army, attempting by force to capture the town of Valenciennes, Hainaut. The army was repulsed by the citizens of Valenciennes, the French army was then attacked by Hainaut army led by Gerard de Verchain, Seneschal of Hainaut. while attacking the town of Trith. Once again, the French are attacked by the Seneschal of Hainaut. During the ensuing action, Meingre is captured and is taken as a prisoner to Valenciennes.

On 2 September 1345, he accompanied Humbert, Dauphin of Viennois from Marseilles on a crusade against the Aydınids who were besieging Smyrna. Meingre was captured by an Anglo-Gascon force during the Battle of Lunalonge in 1349.

== Marshal of France ==
Maingre, known as Le Boucicaut (the brave) was appointed as the Marshal of France in 1356 and was appointed in 1358 as the lieutenant-general of Poitou, Touraine, Saintonge jointly with William VII of Parthenay. He was appointed as one of the negotiators of the Treaty of Brétigny between King Edward III of England and King John II of France which was drafted on 8 May 1360 and ratified on 24 October 1360. Maingre accompanied the Dauphiné Charles on his journey from Avignon in 1362.

Boucicaut led an army that captured the towns of Mantes and Meulan from King Charles II of Navarre. He took part in the expedition against the French free companies and replaced Bertrand Du Guesclin, in command of the troops of Normandy.

He died in Dijon, France on 15 March 1367 and was buried in the church of Saint Martin of Tours. He was succeeded by his son Jean II Le Maingre, who also became Marshal of France.
