= Battle (formation) =

Medieval division of an army

A battle or bataille was a division of a medieval army. The word may be rendered as "battalion", but Abels and Bachrach et al. state this is not accurate because the bataille was a completely ad hoc formation.

In late medieval warfare, field armies were often drawn up into three main battles, also called guards or wards: the vanguard (avant-garde), the middle guard, and the rearguard (arrière-garde), often abbreviated to simply the van, middle, and rear. These terms imply, correctly, that the van preceded the middle, which in turn preceded the rear into battle, if the battles were arranged sequentially as a column. If arranged abreast, the van was on the right, the middle in the center, and the rear on the left.
