= Route nationale 11 =

Road in France

The Route nationale 11, or RN11, is a trunk road (nationale) in Southwest France between Poitiers and La Rochelle. It is part of European route E611.

== Reclassification ==
The road has been downgraded along part of its original route and re-numbered the RD611 between Poitiers and Niort.

== Route ==
=== Poitiers to Niort (0km to 68 Km) (As RD611) ===
The road begins on the RN10 south west of Poitiers branching west towards the coast. It passes the Abbey of Fontaine-le-Comte and then by-passes the village of Lusignan. The road enters the Foret de Soudan and a junction with the A10 autoroute, afterwards passing through the village of Soudan.

At Saint-Maucent-l'École the road crosses the river Sèvre Niortaise. South of La Crèche the road crosses the A83 autoroute becoming a dual-carriageway. The road enters the town of Niort.

=== Niort to La Rochelle (68km to 138 km) ===
The road passes Southwest now designated European Route E601. At Mauze-sur-le-Mignon the road turns north west through Foret de Benon and over the marshes including the Canal de Marane and then reaches the port of La Rochelle on the Atlantic coast.

The road here has a junction with the RN137 which runs along the coast connecting Nantes to Rochefort, designated the European Route E3. The RD11 becomes the Boulevard Andre Sautel as it heads towards the city centre. The RN735 connects the RN11 to the airport and the Pont-Viaduc, a bridge leading to the Île de Ré.
