= Château de Lusignan =

10th–18th century castle in Poitou, France

Coordinates: 46°26′14″N 0°7′40″E

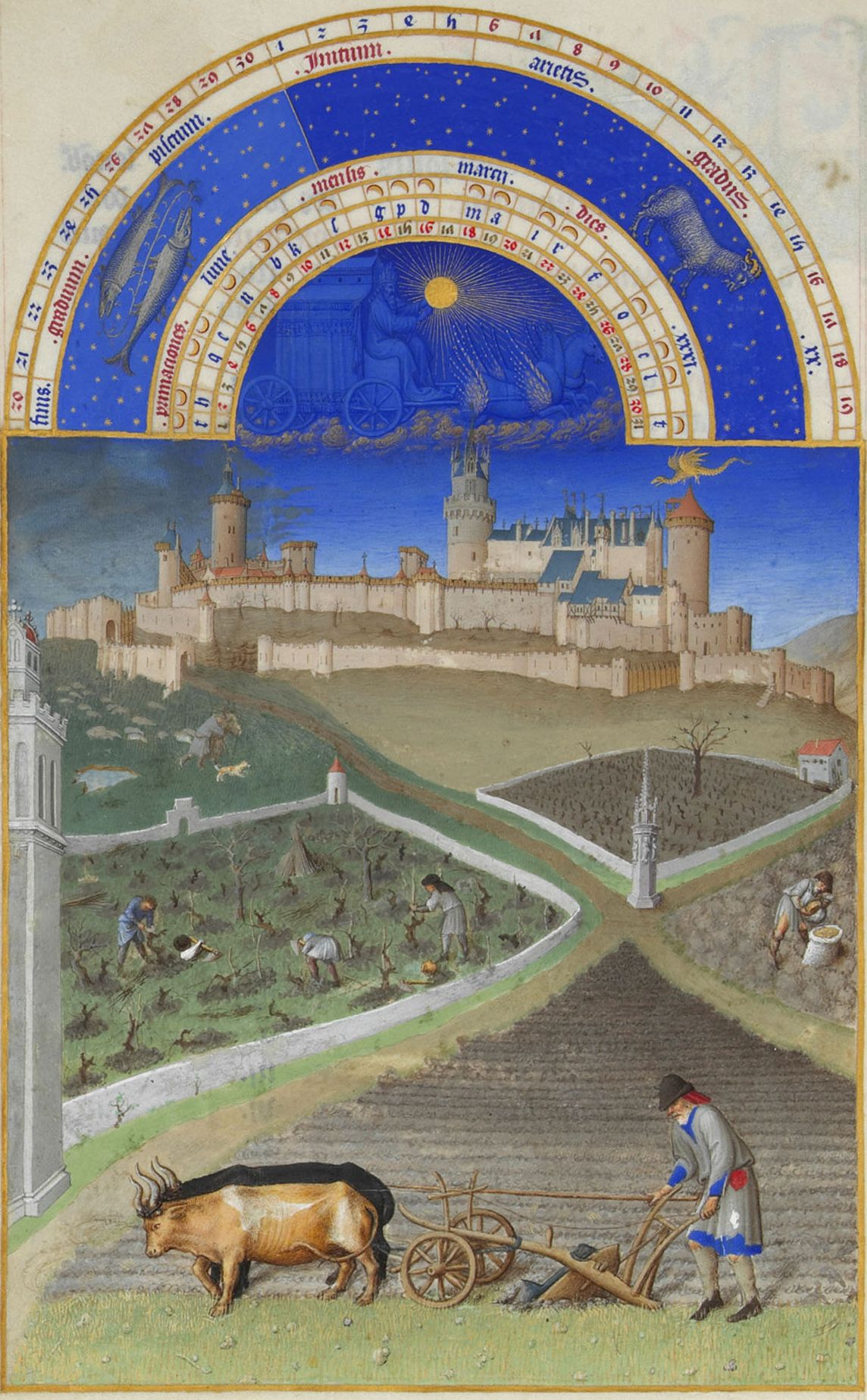
Les Très Riches Heures du duc de Berry, March: the Château de Lusignan

The Château de Lusignan (in Lusignan, Vienne département, France), of which hardly any traces remain, was the ancestral seat of the House of Lusignan, Poitevin marcher lords, who distinguished themselves in the First Crusade and became the royal family of the Kingdom of Jerusalem, the Kingdom of Cyprus and the Armenian Kingdom of Cilicia. Built in the 10th century, it reached its peak four centuries later, decayed and was finally dismantled in the 18th century.

== Castle, town nucleus, prison ==
Construction of the castle, which eventually counted among the largest to be built in France, started during the second half of the 10th century under Hugh II of Lusignan (d. 967). This castle was dismantled during the 12th and then rebuilt in the 13th and again at the end of the 14th century.

Lusignan was constructed in the region of Poitou, occupying a natural strongpoint, a narrow promontory that overlooked steep valleys on either side. It was already so impressive in the 12th century that a legend developed to the effect that its founder had faery aid, in the guise of the water spirit Melusine, who built it and its church through her arts, as a gift for her husband Raymondin.

Lusignan at its height, just as it was in the early 15th century, is illustrated in the Très Riches Heures of John, Duke of Berry, for whom it was a favourite residence until his death in 1416. It rises in the background of the miniature for the month of March (see illustration), clearly shown in perspective, with its barbican tower at the left, the clock tower — with the exterior chute of the garderobe to its right — and the Tour Poitevine on the right, above which the gilded dragon flies, the protective spirit of Melusine.

After the duke of Berry's death, Lusignan became briefly the property of John, Dauphin of France (died May 1417) and then passed to his brother, Charles, the future Charles VII.

First the village, then the town of Lusignan, grew up beneath the castle gates, along the slope. It formed a further enceinte (surrounding fortification) when it too was later enclosed by walls. Lusignan remained a strategically important place in Poitou, in the heart of France. During the French Wars of Religion, in 1574, a plan was made of the castle's defenses; it is kept in the Bibliothèque Nationale, Paris.

In the following century Lusignan was reinforced in the modern manner by Louis XIV's military architect, Vauban. Thus it was a natural structure to be used as a prison. Later it housed a school.

== Destruction ==
The château was long used as a local quarry of pre-cut stone before it was razed by Paul Esprit Marie de La Bourdonnaye, comte de Blossac in the 18th century, to make a pleasure ground for the town of Lusignan.

== Today ==
What remains today are largely parts of the foundations, some built into steep hillside, part of the keep, the base of the Tour Poitevine, cisterns and cellars and remains of a subterranean passage that probably once led to the church.

== See also ==
- List of castles in France
