= Nosy Varika =

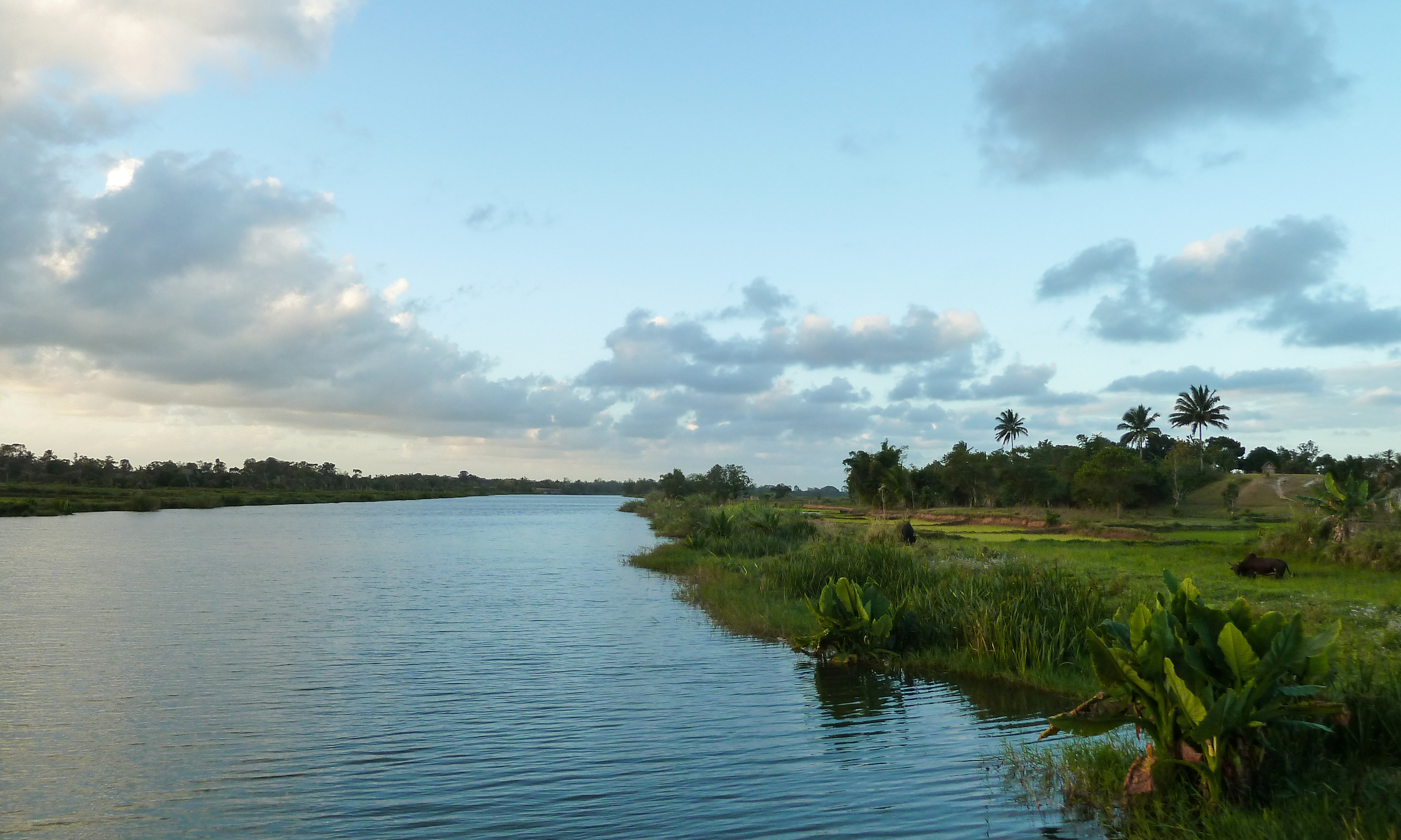

- Location in Madagascar
- Coordinates: 20°35′S 48°32′E
- Country: Madagascar
- Region: Vatovavy
- District: Nosy Varika

Area
  - Total: 316 km^{2} (122 sq mi)
- Elevation: 5 m (16 ft)

Population (2018)
  - Total: 19,787
- Time zone: UTC3 (EAT)
- Code postal: 319

Nosy Varika is a town and commune in Madagascar. It belongs to the district of Nosy Varika, which is a part of the region of Vatovavy. The population of the commune was estimated to be approximately 19,787 in 2018.

Nosy Varika is served by a local airport and riverine harbour. In addition to primary schooling the town offers secondary education at both junior and senior levels. The town provides access to hospital services to its citizens.

Around 75% of the population works in fishing. 20% are farmers, while an additional 2% receives their livelihood from raising livestock. The most important crop is rice, while other important products are coffee, lychee and pepper. Services provide employment for 3% of the population.

== Geography ==
Nosy Varika is situated at 130 km north of Mananjary on the RN 11 and at the Sakaleona river. At a distance of 7 km North from the city can be found the lake of Alanampotsy and at 107 km the Sakaleona Falls.
