= Route nationale 32 (Madagascar) =

Road in Madagascar

Location
- Country: Madagascar

Highway system
- Roads in Madagascar

Route nationale 32 (RN 32) is a secondary highway in Madagascar from Antsohihy to Mandritsara, continuing to Andilamena. It crosses the regions of Alaotra-Mangoro and Sofia Region.

== Selected locations on route (from north to south) ==
- Antsohihy (junction with RN 6)
- Befandriana-Avaratra - (86 km)
- river crossing
- Binara
- Mandritsara
- Marotandrano
- Ambohibary
- Sahavoay
- Marofano
- Ambodivelatra
- Antranoambo
- Antanimenabaka
- Andilamena (continues as RN 3a)

== See also ==
- List of roads in Madagascar
- Transport in Madagascar
