= Ambolomborona =

Settlement in Madagascar

- Settlement
- Interactive map of Ambolomborona
- Coordinates: 16°37′0″S 48°11′0″E
- Country: Madagascar
- Province: Toamasina
- Region: Alaotra-Mangoro
- District: Andilamena

Ambolomborona is a settlement in Madagascar. It is located in Andilamena, Toamasina.

== Tradition culture roles ==
This is the place where Davidson R. resided and performed his public duty. He held the ody havandra ('hail medicine'), a talisman found in every rice-producing region of the Highlands. He used this staff to puncture the white clouds that brought out hail.
