= Akron Zoo =

Akron Zoological Park

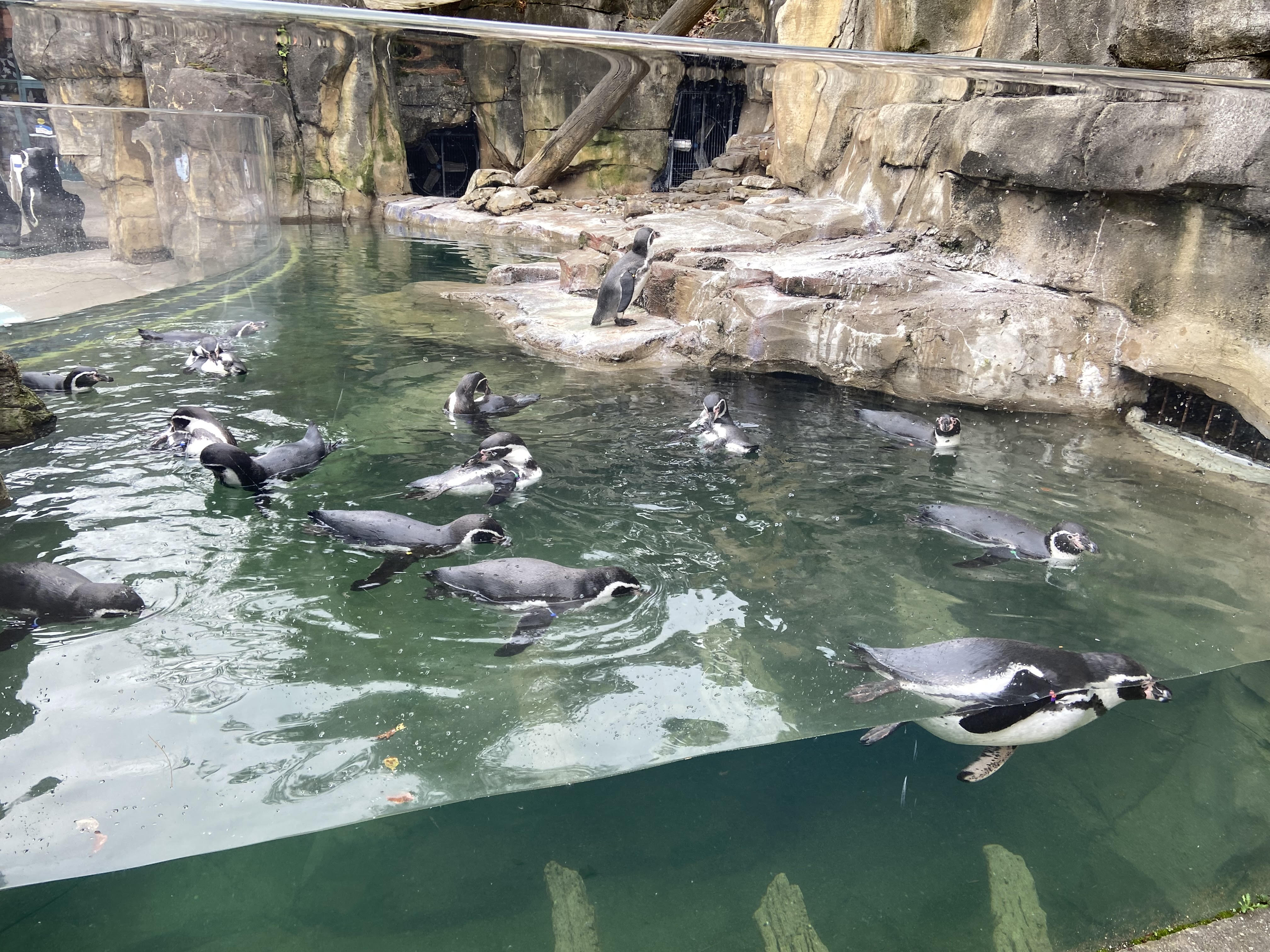
- The Humboldt penguin colony in the zoo's Penguin Point exhibit.
- Interactive map of Akron Zoological Park
- 41.080047°N 81.541429°W
- Date opened: 1953
- Location: Akron, Ohio, United States
- Land area: 77 acres (31 ha)
- No. of animals: >1,000
- No. of species: 90
- Annual visitors: 400,000
- Memberships: AZA, WAZA
- Major exhibits: Penguin Point, Legends of the Wild, Komodo Kingdom, Curious Creatures, Wild Asia, Grizzly Ridge, Pride of Africa, Zoo Gardens, Wild Prairie
- Public transit: METRO
- Website: www.akronzoo.org

The Akron Zoo, officially known as the Akron Zoological Park, is a non-profit zoo located just west of downtown in Akron, Ohio, United States. The zoo sits on 77-acre (31 ha) of which 35-acre (14 ha) are occupied with by habitats, amenities, and support.

The Akron Zoo is home to over 1,000 animals representing over 100 different species and it has around 400,000 visitors annually. The zoo is the most visited attraction in Summit County. The Akron Zoo is accredited by the Association of Zoos and Aquariums (AZA) since 1989. As an AZA member, Akron Zoo participates in breeding programs to save endangered species. The zoo is also a member of the World Association of Zoos and Aquariums and of the American Public Gardens Association.

== History ==
In 1900, the 79 acres (32 ha) that is now Perkins Woods Park was donated to Akron by George and Ann Perkins, for "the sole purpose of devoting the same to the uses of a public park, especially as a place for recreation for children." To this end, the Akron Museum of Natural History was incorporated in 1950, and the Akron Children's Zoo was opened in 1953 in association with the Museum. The children's zoo illustrated Mother Goose rhymes with live animal exhibits.

Ten new exhibits were opened in 1954, and one more, the Merry Miller, in 1955. With the sponsorship of the Yusef-Khan Grotto, admission was free to all mentally challenged, handicapped, and underprivileged children.

In 1979, the zoo changed its name to the Akron Zoological Park, and the City of Akron turned over governance of the zoo to the Board of Trustees. The City of Akron retained ownership of the land, and non-profit Akron Zoo now owned all of the zoo's contents. The zoo adopted a new theme of "North and South American Animals" to provide a stable base for education and conservation goals.

The Akron Zoo made nearly $500,000 in capital improvements between 1985 and 1988. Special events such as Holiday Lights and Boo at the Zoo bolstered the zoo's annual attendance with 1988 drawing 133,000 guests breaking the 1957 attendance record of 128,344 visitors. As the decade closed, the Akron Zoological Park was accredited by the American Association of Zoological Parks and Aquariums, recognizing the Akron Zoo's professional stature among accredited zoos and aquariums nationwide.

In May 2005, the zoo opened their largest expansion in their history, Legends of the Wild. This area features 16 animal exhibits, over 20 animal species, and over 400 total animals, including snow leopards, jaguars, lemurs, bats, and many more.

On October 1, 2005, the Akron Zoo unveiled Komodo Kingdom Education Center, featuring Komodo dragons, Galapagos tortoises, and Chinese alligators. Certification by Leaders in Energy and Environmental Design (LEED) was achieved. The zoo utilized current green technology for heating and cooling and the building was built using many earth-friendly materials.

In 2010 the zoo opened a carousel named "Conservation Carousel" featuring rare and endangered animals.

The zoo had record attendance in 2017 with 416,942 visitors.

The zoo announced in July 2024 that they plan to build a new $11.95 million veterinary hospital behind Landon and Cynthia Knight Pride of Africa. Construction on the 11,949 square-foot building will begin in 2025. The new facility will open in 2026.

== Attractions and regions ==
The zoo has a variety of themed areas around the park that are molded after specific regions on the globe.

- Barnhardt Family Welcome Center opened in 2003 and serves at the zoo's entrance. It includes the zoo's ticket counters and gift shop as well as the zoo's administrative offices.
- Penguin Point opened in 2003 and is located right outside the Welcome Center. It is home to the zoo's Humboldt penguin colony.
- Legends of the Wild opened in 2005 and features a 25-foot waterfall and 16 animal habitats. Species include alpaca, Andean condor, Patagonian mara, hyacinth macaw (in warmer weather), Temminck's tragopan (in colder weather), snow leopard, cinereous vulture, white-naped crane, emperor goose, red-breasted goose, tufted deer, and Chilean flamingo. Species in the Madagascar Building include emerald tree boa, mongoose lemur, red ruffed lemur, ring-tailed lemur, and Madagascar giant day gecko. Species in the Nocturnal Building include cave dwelling rat snake, pygmy slow loris, Seba's short-tailed bat, straw-colored fruit bat, green and black poison dart frog, yellow-banded poison dart frog, blue poison dart frog, golden mantella, blue-legged mantella and curlyhair tarantula. There is also a waterfowl pond containing various species of birds including trumpeter swan, Baer's pochard, Baikal teal, bufflehead, falcated duck, hooded merganser, Mandarin duck, marbled teal, and scaly-sided merganser.
- Komodo Kingdom Education Center opened in 2005 and features an indoor exhibit gallery, the zoo's primary food service location, and facilities for the zoo's Education Department are located in the lower level. Species include white-spotted bamboo shark, blue American lobster, Sambava tomato frog, Komodo dragon, and Galápagos tortoise. There is also a mixed species rainforest habitat that includes Midas cichlid, freshwater stingray, golden lion tamarin, yellow-spotted Amazon river turtle, and several species of birds. Outside of Komodo Kingdom is the zoo's Conservation Carousel.
- Curious Creatures opened in 2017 and is an indoor exhibit in the Komodo Kingdom Education Center that features animals and plants that exhibit unique adaptations for survival. Species include naked mole-rat, leaf-cutter ant, peacock mantis shrimp, spotted turtle, electric eel, Puerto Rican boa, giant Pacific octopus, giant prickly stick insect, moon jelly, Pacific sea nettle, Baron's green racer, chain dogfish, pot-bellied seahorse, and a variety of coral, fish, and invertebrate species. There are also a variety of plant species Venus flytrap, sundew, pitcher plant, and butterwort. Curious Creatures is also home to the zoo's Virtual Reality Undersea Explorer experience. This exhibit space was previously occupied by Jellies: Rhythm in the Blue (2008-2011) and Journey to the Reef (2012-2016).
- Lehner Family Foundation Wild Asia opened in 2021 and is the zoo's newest exhibit. Species include Sumatran tiger, red panda, and northern white-cheeked gibbons. Wild Asia is located in a space that the zoo's Tiger Valley was once located.
- Mike and Mary Stark Grizzly Ridge opened in 2013. It covers 4.2 acres (1.7 ha) making it the largest expansion in Akron Zoo to date. Species include grizzly bear, bald eagle, North American river otter, eastern screech owl, northern bobwhite quail, red wolf, and coyote. There is also a 45-foot (14 m) high aviary for native birds.
- Landon and Cynthia Knight Pride of Africa opened in 2019 and is inspired by Africa's Southern Rift. Species include yellow-backed duikers, white storks, crested guineafowl, and African lions. There is also a boma featuring African pygmy goats and Nigerian dwarf goats. It is also home to the zoo's train. A second phase is being planned which will have giraffes and other African species.
- Lehner Family Zoo Gardens opened in 2003 and contains Nature's Theater, Nature's View rental space, Garden View Place animal holding building with the Garden View Aviary attached that contains Lady Amherst's pheasant and Temminck's tragopan (seasonally), and the zoo's formal gardens.
- Wild Prairie opened in 2002. It contains a food service location, the Frontier Town play area, a snowy owl habitat, the Wild Prairie Pavilion, and Gardener's Shed, which features a barn owl habitat.

== Animal enrichment activities ==
Behavioral enrichment activities and other design are commonly used in zoos today. They are characterized as changes in the ordinary that are meant to encourage animals' natural behaviors. Some of the natural behaviors encouraged from enrichment are foraging for food and hiding in nature's provisions. Zookeepers occasionally introduce various scents around an animal's exhibit that are unfamiliar to the animal. Plants and trees are sometimes added or removed to allow for animal to create new hiding places or have more open space. Animals often receive new toys and puzzle feeders in their areas.

== Volunteers ==
The Akron Zoo has had a tremendous amount of funding and help through their adult volunteer program. These volunteers, known as Edzoocators, frequently help out with special events, and their biggest event for the zoo is Boo at the Akron Zoo, which had its 20-year anniversary in 2009. A new addition to the zoo is that of the Jr. Interpreter Teen Program. Started in 2008, the Jr. Interpreters are teen volunteers who spend up to 40 hours each week during the summer to help out around the zoo.

== Conservation efforts ==
The Akron Zoo is involved in various conservation projects that focus in the areas of restoration, preservation, and reintroduction.

The Venezuelan Waterfowl Foundation is active internationally and it was formed as a result of the staff's efforts in working with conservationists in Venezuela and other accredited institutions within the zoo community. The Foundation focuses on the conservation of the Andean river systems and is researching the illusive torrent duck.

The Butterfly Conservation Initiative is a partnership of Akron Zoo partnered and the other Ohio zoos, The Wilds, and the Association of Zoos and Aquariums to help create a butterfly habitat at The Wilds. 10 acres (4.0 ha) of open grassland and meadow habitat were planted, creating a suitable site to support a variety of resident and migrant butterfly species.

The Akron Zoo has participated in the Audubon Christmas Bird Census, which is coordinated by the National Audubon Society to document wintering bird populations across the United States. In 2003, participants from the Akron Zoo donated 18.5 hours for the census. The volunteers observed a total of 28 species and counted 2,568 individual birds.

The zoo works with various partners locally, regionally, and globally. These partners include Conservación Internacional Perú, Fauna & Flora International, the Red Panda Network, the Red Wolf Coalition, and Save and Protect Ohio Turtle Diversity (SPOTD). The zoo participates in research in the health of the white-winged wood duck. The zoo also works to help reintroduce the Patula snail back to their native French Polynesia.

== Gallery ==
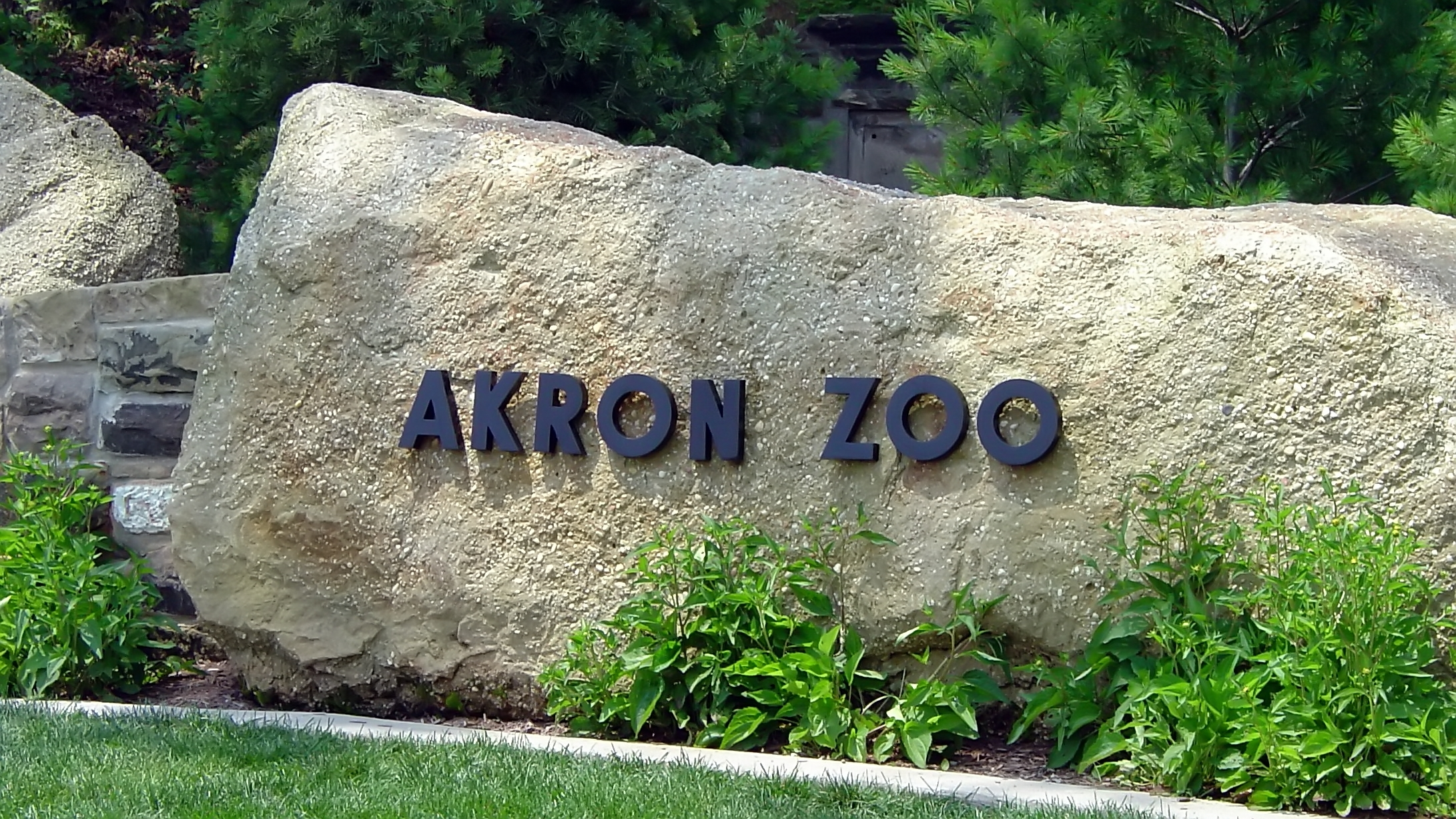
Akron Zoo sign 2004

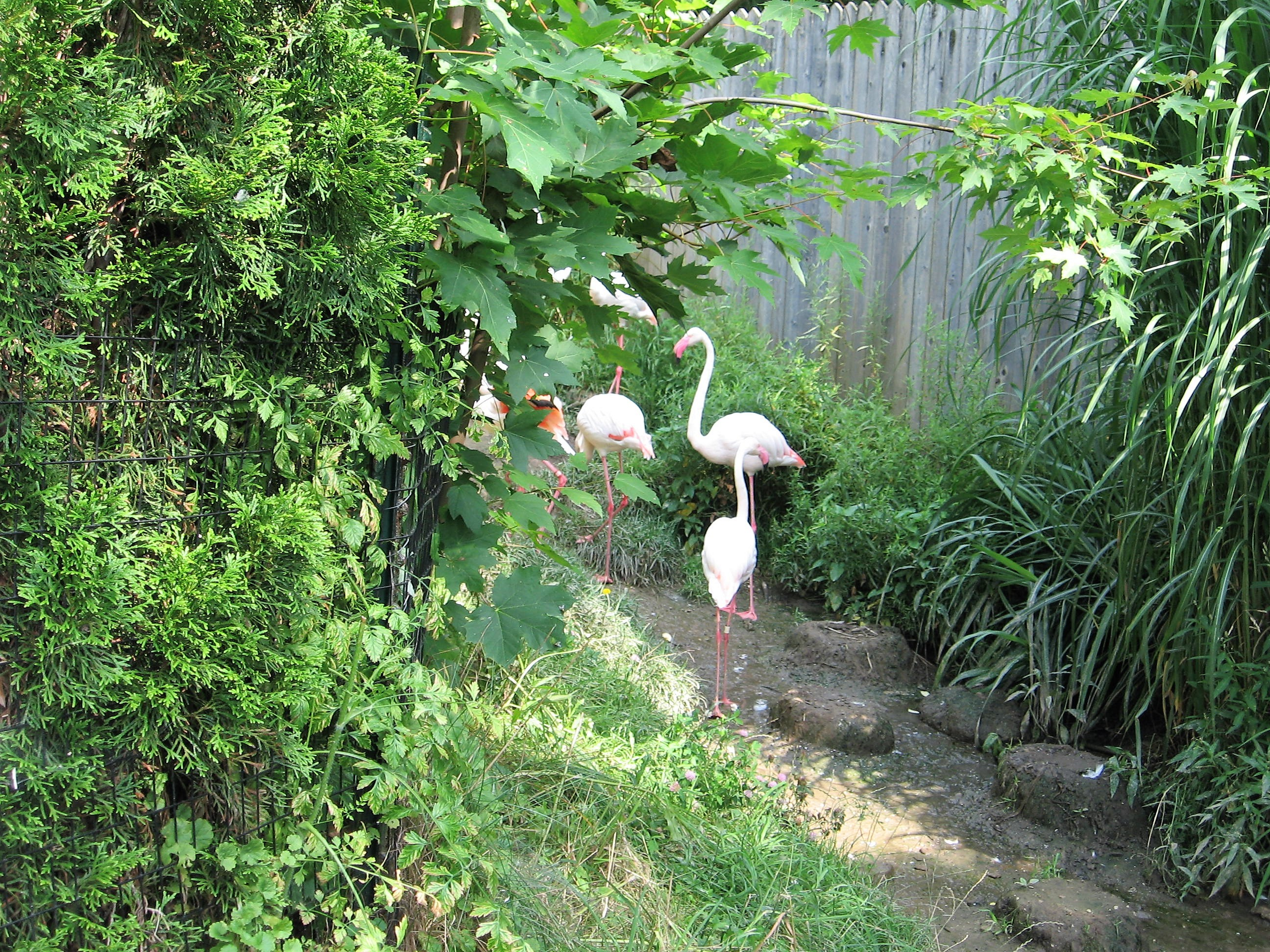
Akron Zoo Flamingos 2006

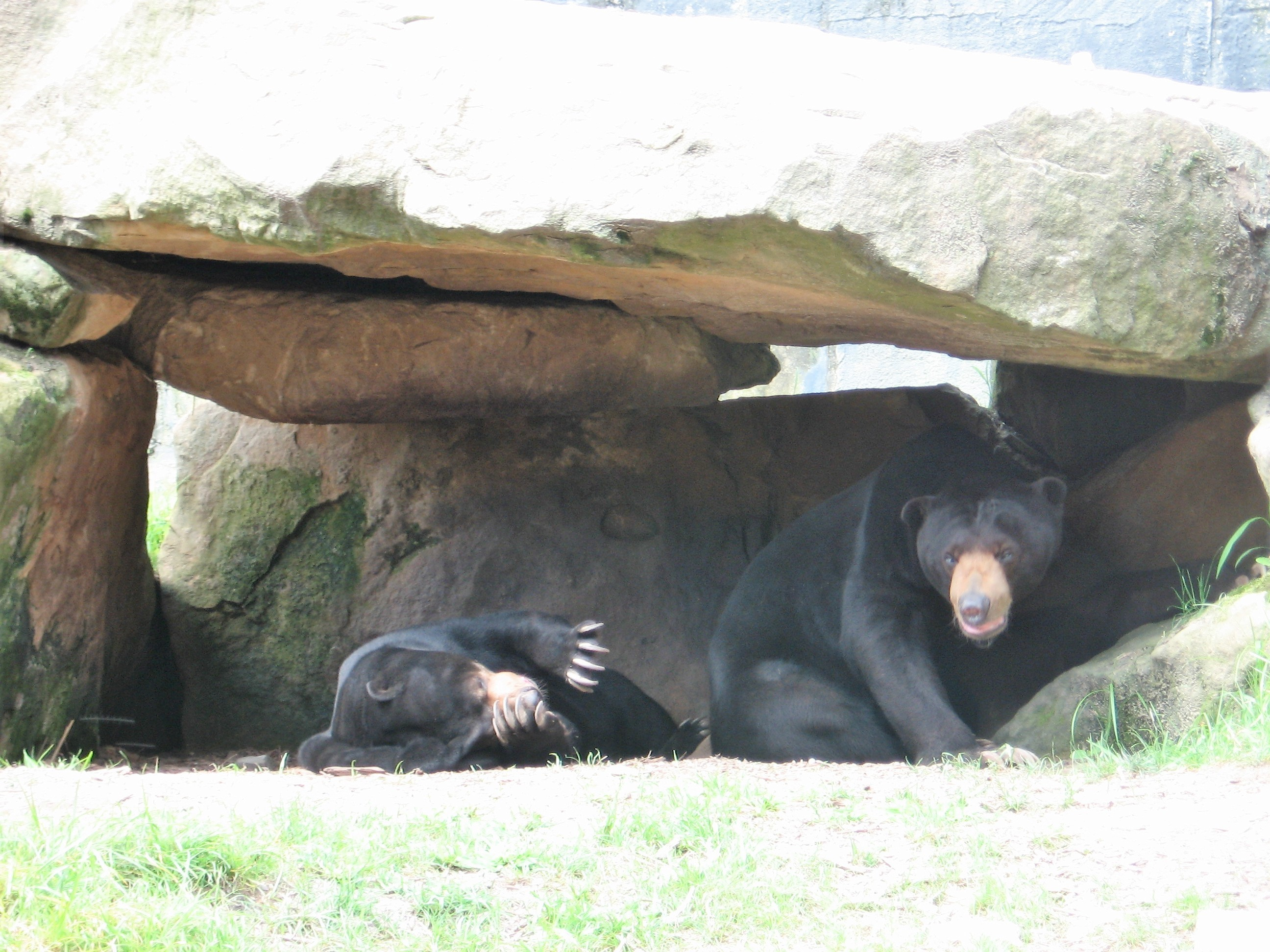
Akron Zoo Bears 2006

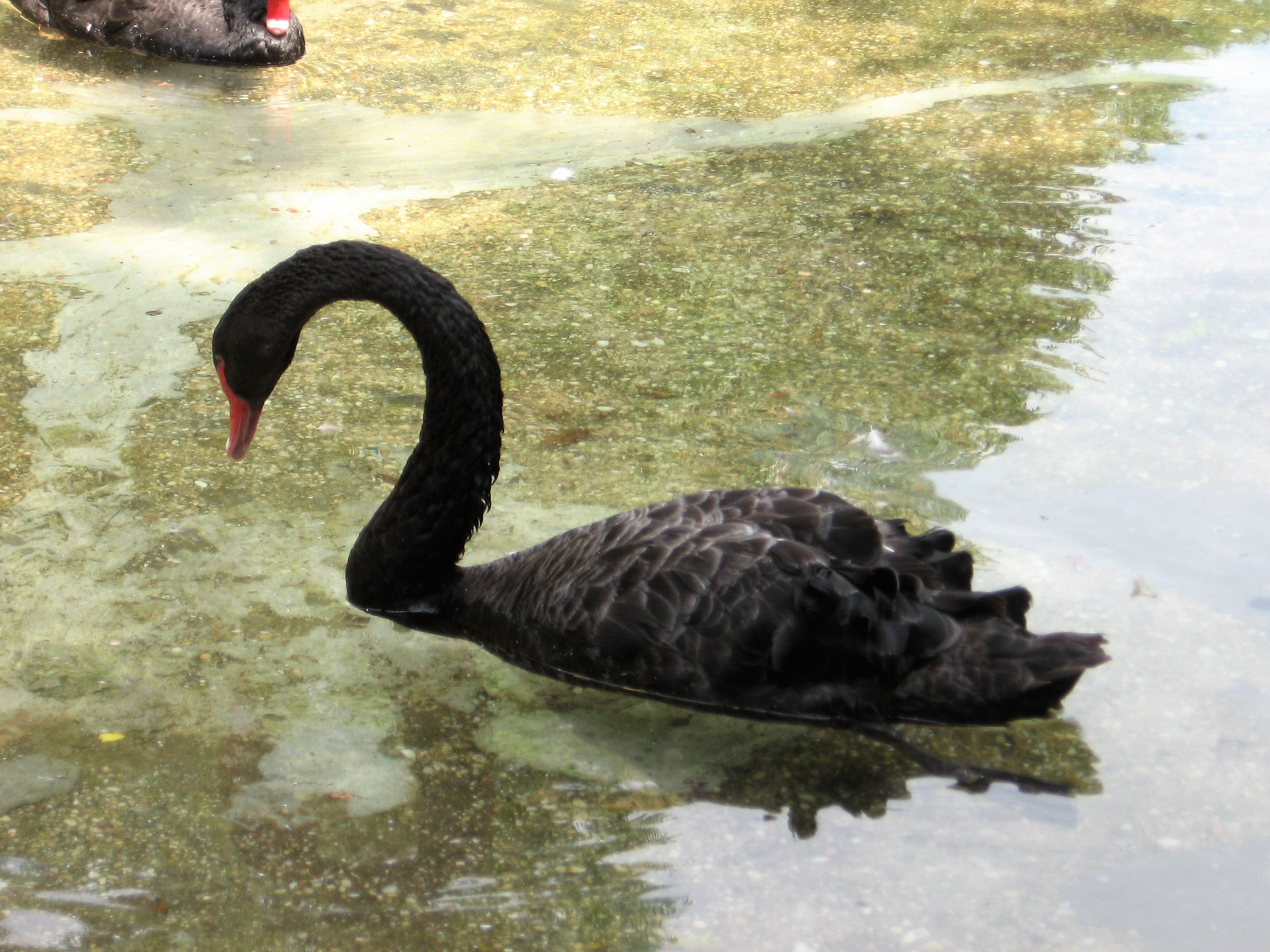
Akron Zoo Swan 2006

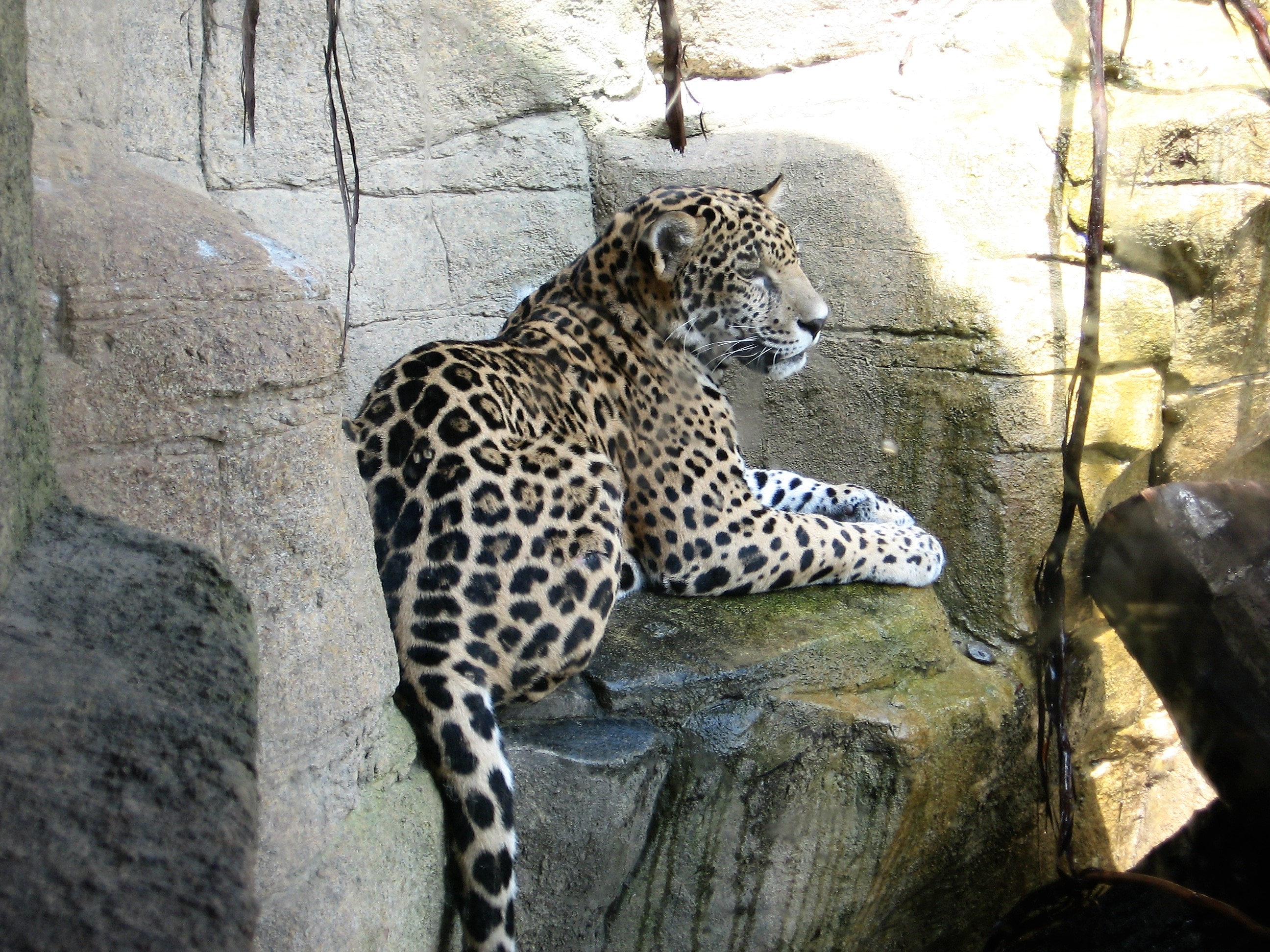
Akron Zoo Jaguar 2006

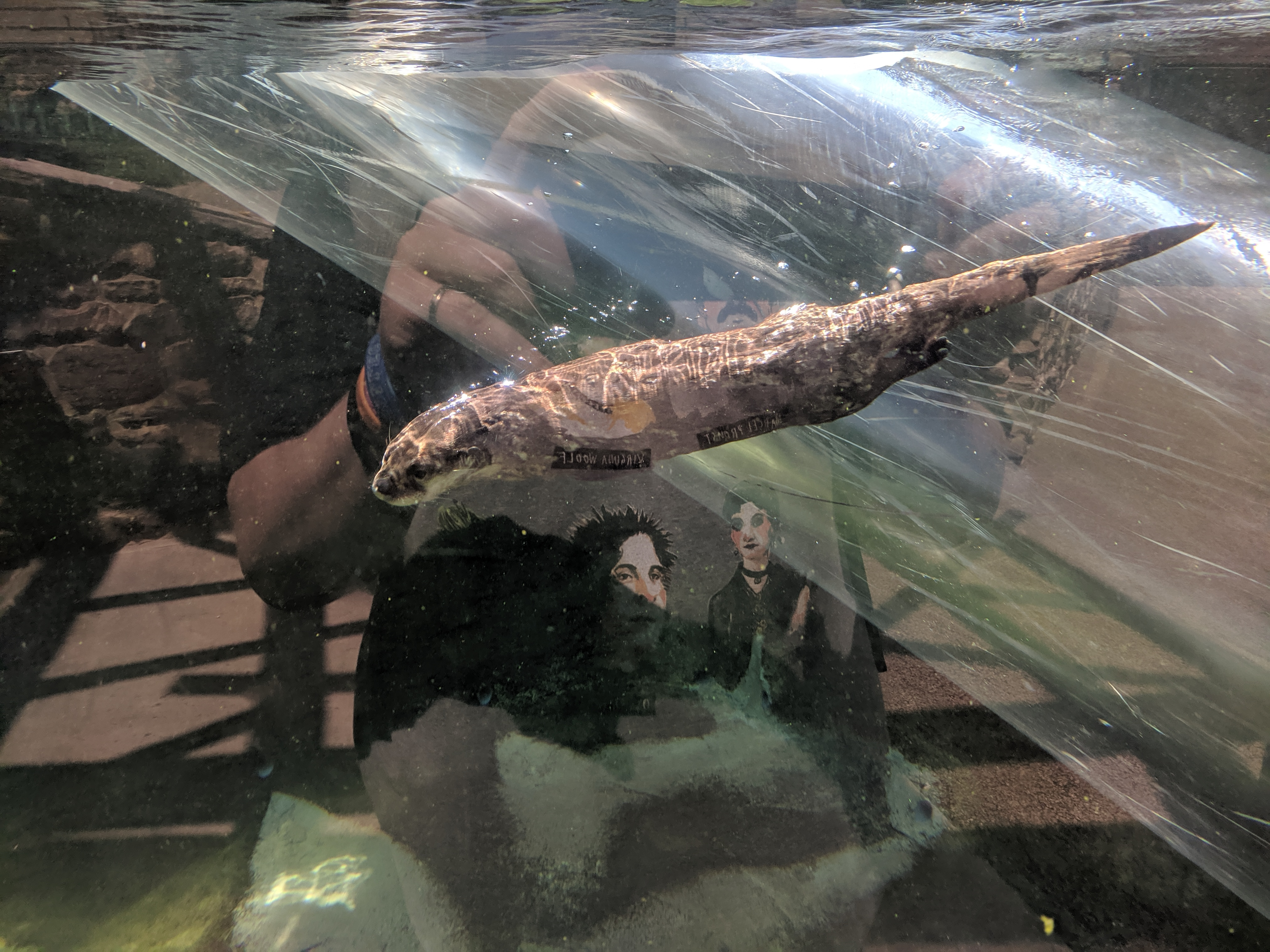
Akron Zoo Otter 2019

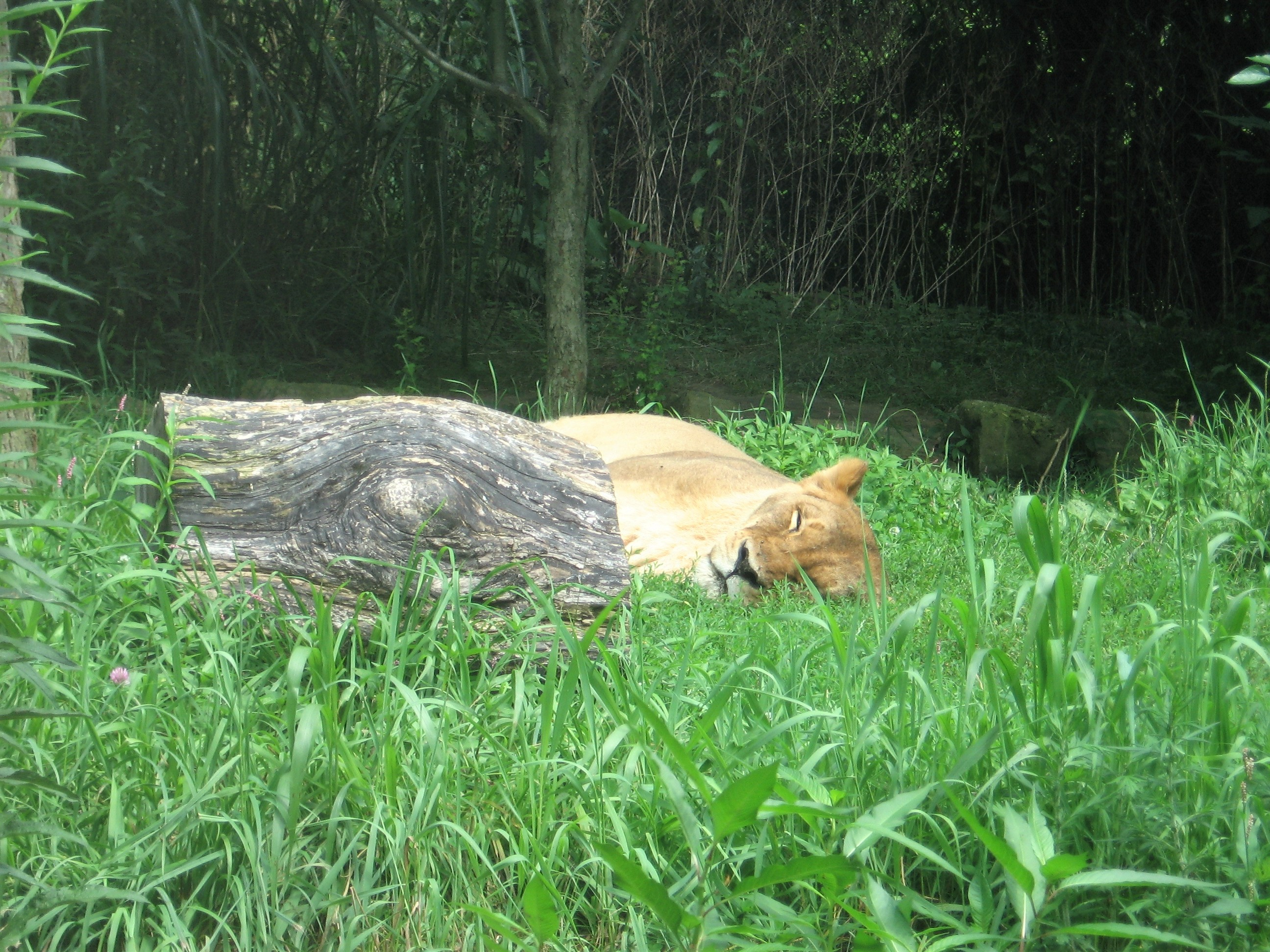
Akron Zoo Lion sleeping 2006

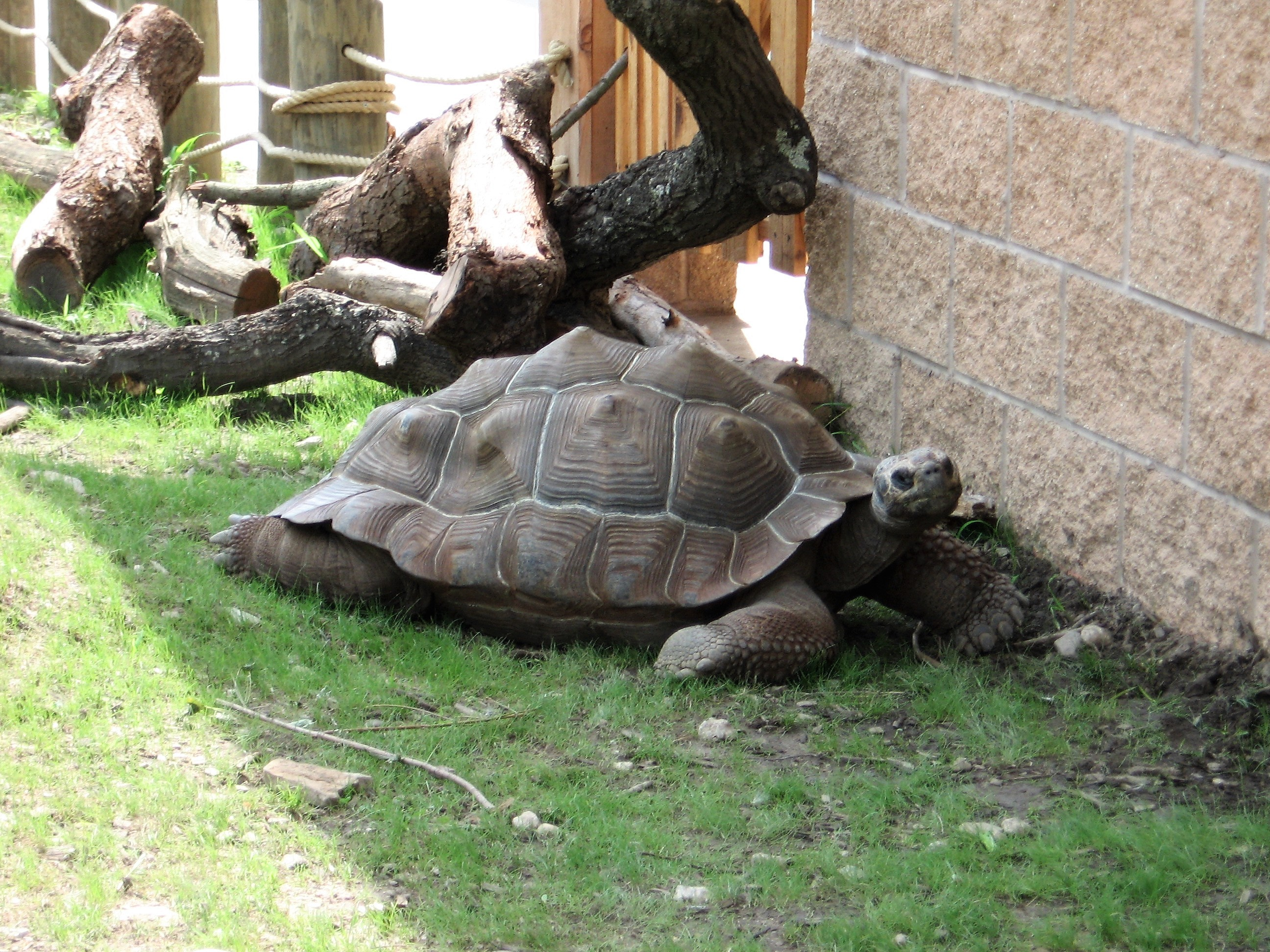
Akron Zoo Tortoise 2006

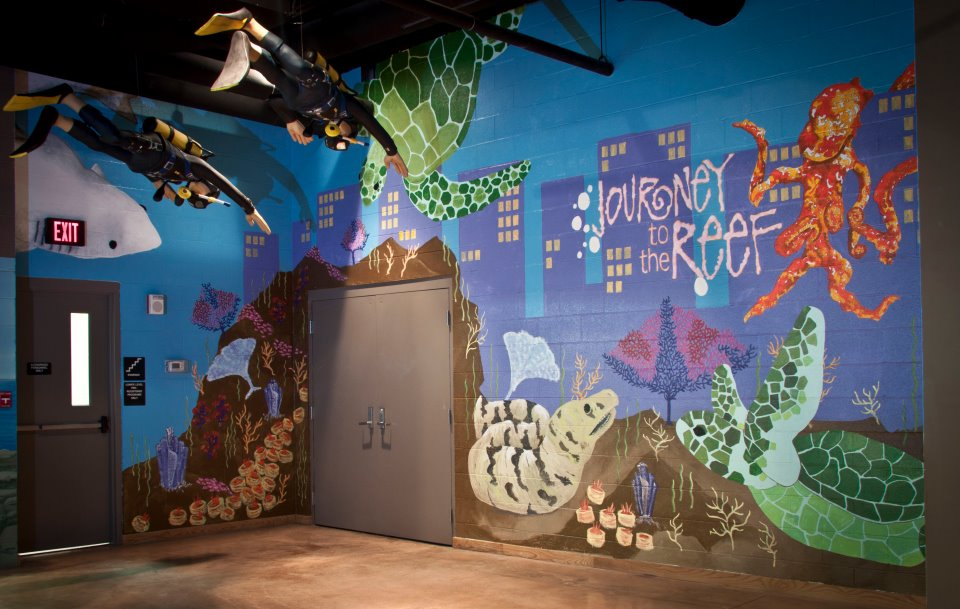
Journey to the Reef Mural 2012

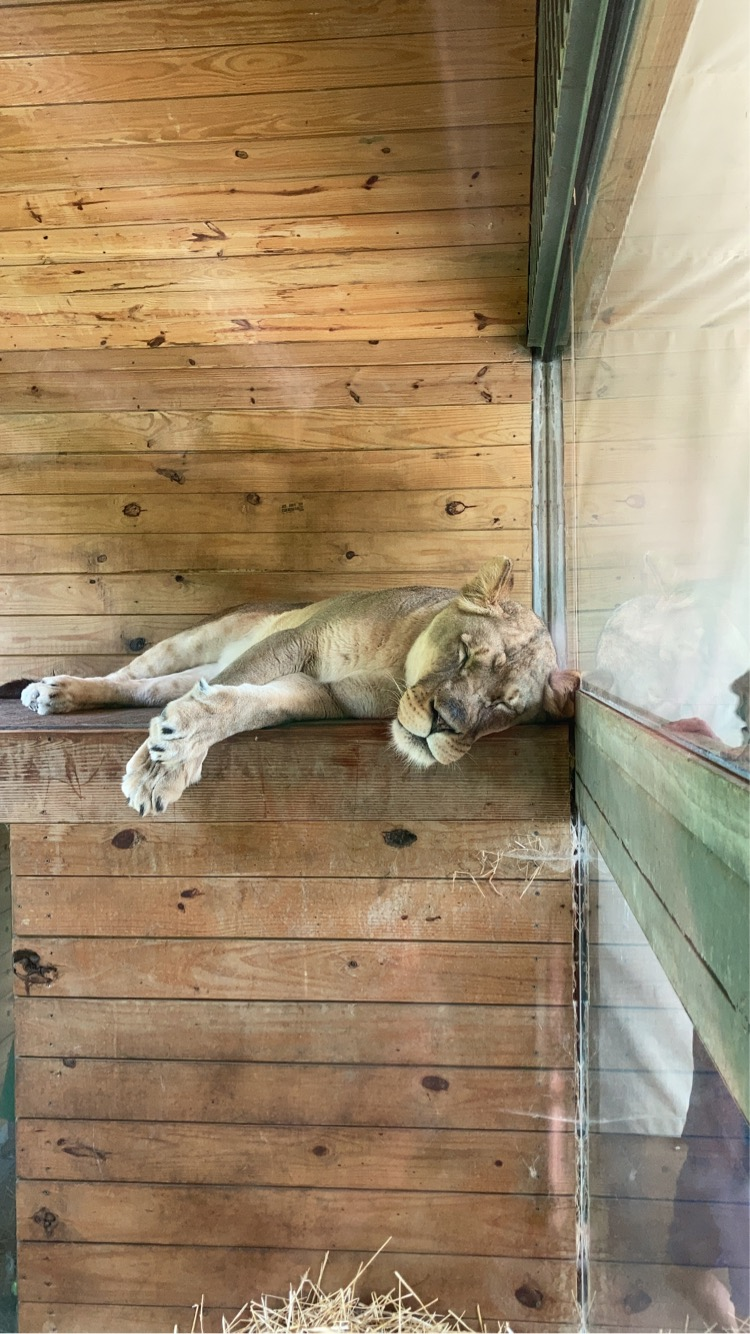
Akron Zoo Lion Napping 2023
