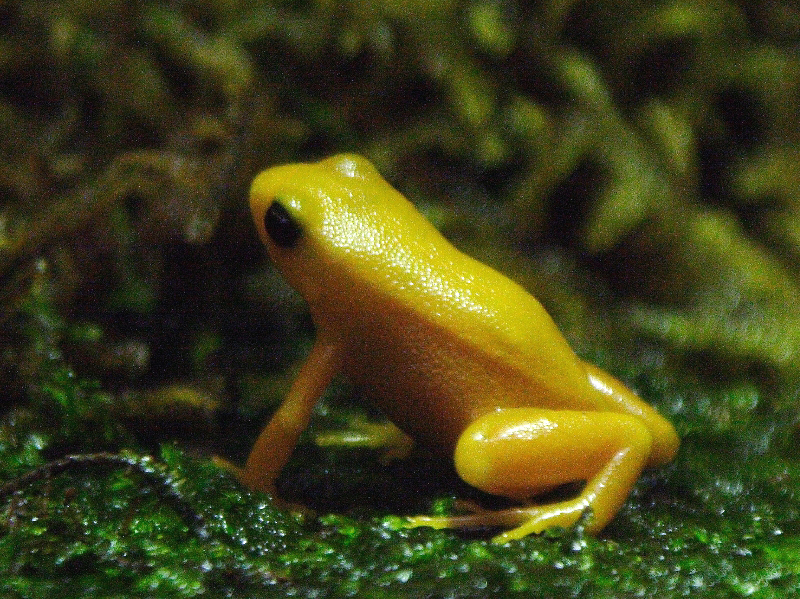
- Golden form
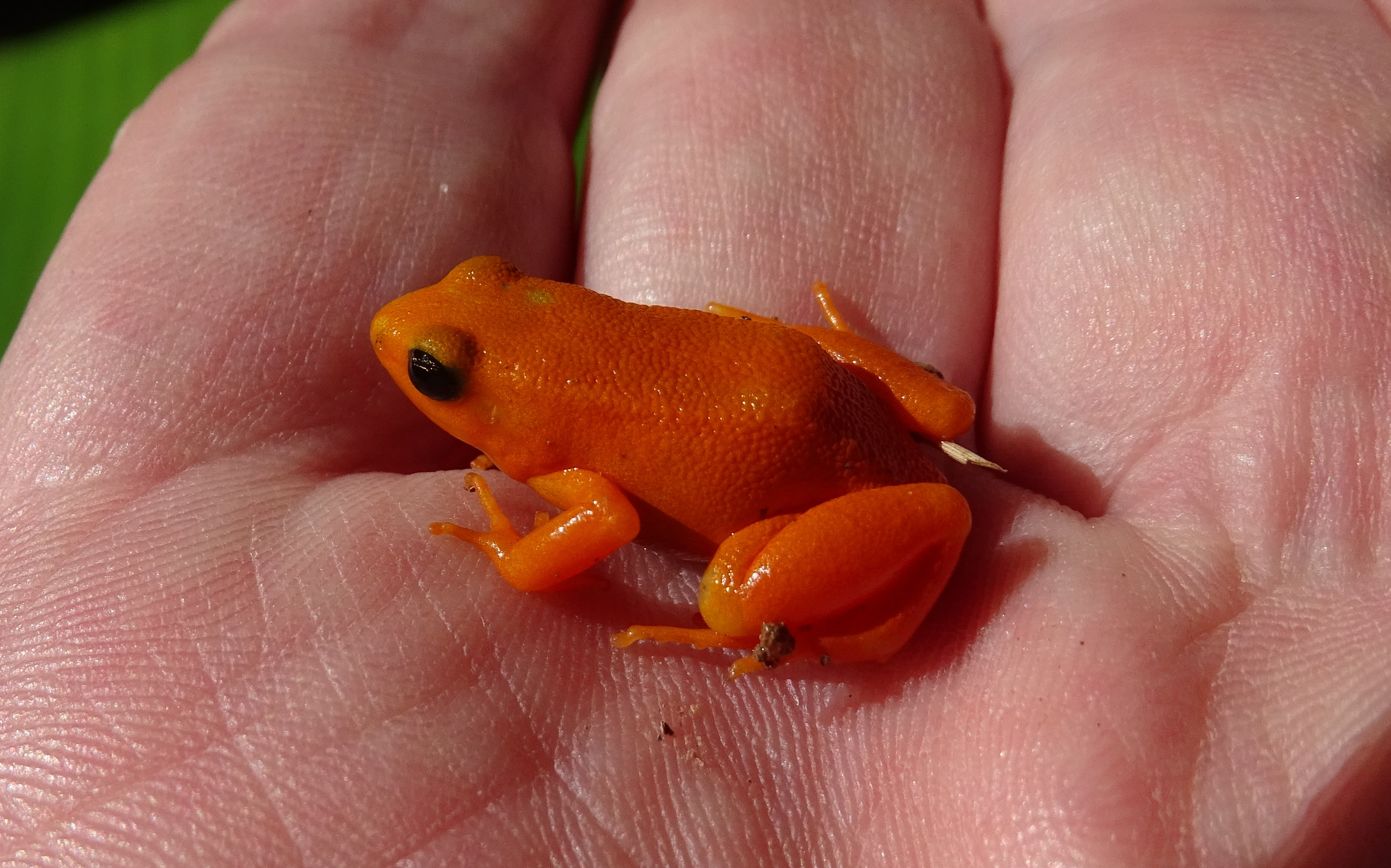
- Red form

Conservation status
- Endangered (IUCN 3.1)

Scientific classification
- Kingdom: Animalia
- Phylum: Chordata
- Class: Amphibia
- Order: Anura
- Family: Mantellidae
- Genus: Mantella
- Species: M. aurantiaca

Binomial name
- Mantella aurantiaca Mocquard, 1900
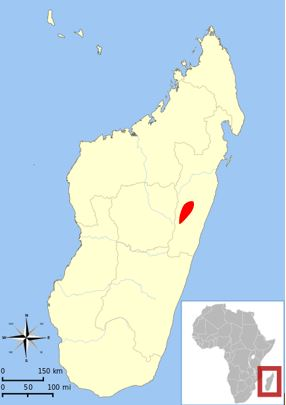
- Distribution of the golden mantella in Madagascar

= Golden mantella =

Species of amphibian

The golden mantella (Mantella aurantiaca) is a small, terrestrial frog endemic to Madagascar. It has an extremely restricted distribution in three distinct areas centered on the town of Moramanga - Beparasy and Ambohibary Communes, Torotorofotsy Wetland northwest of Andasibe, and in the area of Ambakoana. Mantella aurantiaca is one of Madagascar's most threatened amphibian species due to its limited distribution in an area under tremendous anthropogenic pressure. It may also be threatened by over-collection for the pet trade.

== Description ==
The golden mantella is a uniformly yellow, orange, or red frog measuring 20–26 mm. The inner leg displays red flash marks. The tympanum is visible, but small. Brightly colored skin warns predators that the frog is poisonous. It is thought that the brilliant colors exhibited by the golden mantella are an example of aposematism, warning predators of the poisonous nature of the frog.

== Ecology and behaviour ==
The golden mantella is highly seasonal in its behaviour and remains largely inactive during the winter months of May–October. During the summer, the golden mantella is commonly active during the day. They live in groups of typically twice as many males as there are females. When the rains arrive and the temperature warms, frogs emerge from hiding and use small lentic wetlands for breeding. Males often call from concealed positions near a water source. The call is a rather pleasant, repeated click. The frogs do not seem to engage in typical amplexus but rather the male only moves himself over the female's back in virtual amplexus. Eggs are laid on land in moist leaf litter near water and when rains arrive the tadpoles are washed from land into water.

The golden mantella has a diet of small invertebrates. In the wild, this mainly consists of mites, ants, flies, and collembolans. The frogs derive their skin toxins from their diet. These toxins include pumiliotoxin, allopumiliotoxin, homopumiliotoxin alkaloids, pyrrolizidines, indolizidines and quinolizidines. Although poisonous, the snake Thamnosophis lateralis and a skink of the genus Zonosaurus have been observed preying upon this species at Torotorofotsy Wetland.

=== In captivity ===
There are plans to launch a legal regulated collection program for this species.

Showings from a 2017 study found significant difference in captive vs wild golden mantella behavioral response times in captive populations vs wild populations, favoring captive populations.

The golden mantella is occasionally seen in the pet trade and kept in captivity by exotic animal collectors and zoological institutions. They are popular due to their diurnal activity, attractive coloration and relative ease to keep when settled in. Care sheets are easily found for this species. On the downside, however, the golden mantella is critically endangered, and the population is decreasing.

== Taxonomy ==
=== Etymology ===
The species was described by the French herpetologist François Mocquard in 1900 on the basis of one a male individual 21.2 mm long. The type species was found in forests in the area between Beforana and Moramanga. The species name comes from the Latin aurantiacus meaning gold. There is a name for an unrecognized taxon M. a. rubra, which was recognized as a synonym for the golden mantel, comes from the Latin rubra, red.

=== Convergent Evolution ===
Convergent evolution is the similar evolution of multiple species found in different habitats. The Golden Mantella evolved on Madagascar but shares many of the same adaptations of frogs in Central and South American poisonous frogs in the Dendrobatidae family (Edmond 2020). For example, the Golden Mantella frogs and the poisonous frogs in the Dendrobatidae family share similar traits of "sequestration of poisonous skin alkaloids from prey, aposematic coloration, and comparable reproductive behaviors" (Edmonds 325). The Golden Mantella frog and the poisonous frogs in the Dendrobatidae family found in Central and South America evolved very similarly and developed almost the same traits to adapt to similar environments.
