= Allopumiliotoxin 267A =

Names
- Preferred IUPAC name (6E,7R,8R,8aS)-8-Methyl-6-[(2R)-2-methylhexylidene]octahydroindolizine-7,8-diol

Identifiers
CAS Number	73376-38-2
3D model (JSmol)	Interactive image
ChemSpider	4580699
PubChem CID	5470308
UNII	TEP57TLJ38
CompTox Dashboard (EPA)	DTXSID301027204
- InChI: InChI=1S/C16H29NO2/c1-4-5-7-12(2)10-13-11-17-9-6-8-14(17)16(3,19)15(13)18/h10,12,14-15,18-19H,4-9,11H2,1-3H3/b13-10+/t12-,14+,15-,16-/m1/s1 Key: LWXKAVPXEDNHLL-VRUXTKGDSA-N; InChI=1/C16H29NO2/c1-4-5-7-12(2)10-13-11-17-9-6-8-14(17)16(3,19)15(13)18/h10,12,14-15,18-19H,4-9,11H2,1-3H3/b13-10+/t12-,14+,15-,16-/m1/s1 Key: LWXKAVPXEDNHLL-VRUXTKGDBX
- SMILES: O[C@@H]1C(=C\[C@H](C)CCCC)\CN2[C@H]([C@]1(O)C)CCC2

Properties
Chemical formula	C_{16}H_{29}NO_{2}
Molar mass	267.413 g·mol^{−1}

Hazards
- Occupational safety and health (OHS/OSH)
Main hazards	Highly toxic
- Except where otherwise noted, data are given for materials in their standard state (at 25 °C [77 °F], 100 kPa). verify (what is ?) Infobox references

Allopumiliotoxin 267A is a toxin found in the skin of several poison frogs of the family Dendrobates. It is a member of the class of compounds known as allopumiliotoxins. The frogs produce the toxin by modifying the original version, pumiliotoxin 251D. It has been tested on mice and found to be five times more potent than the former version. It has been produced synthetically through a variety of different routes.

== See also ==
- Pumiliotoxin
- Allopumiliotoxin
