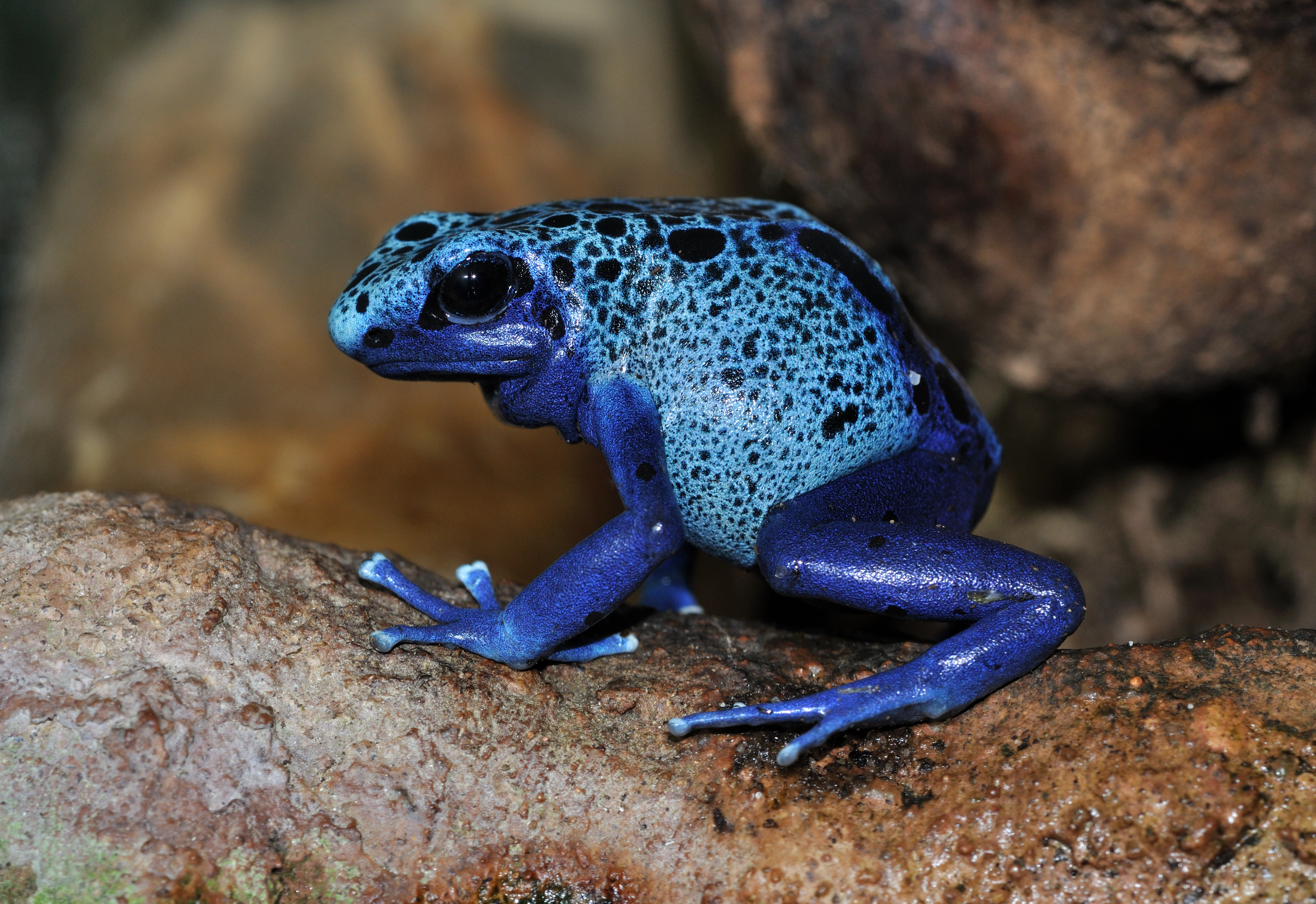

Conservation status
- Least Concern (IUCN 3.1)

Scientific classification
- Kingdom: Animalia
- Phylum: Chordata
- Class: Amphibia
- Order: Anura
- Family: Dendrobatidae
- Genus: Dendrobates
- Species: D. tinctorius
- Subspecies: D. t. "azureus"

Trinomial name
- Dendrobates tinctorius "azureus" (Hoogmoed, 1969)

= Blue poison dart frog =

Species of amphibian

The blue poison dart frog or blue poison arrow frog (Dendrobates tinctorius "azureus") is a poison dart frog found in the "forest islands" surrounded by the Sipaliwini Savanna in southern Suriname. Its indigenous Tiriyo name is okopipi. The name "azureus" comes from its azure blue color. While first described as a valid species and usually recognized as such in the past, recent authorities generally treat it as a morph of D. tinctorius, although a few treat it as a subspecies of D. tinctorius or continue to treat it as its own species. To what extent it differs from the blue D. tinctorius in southern Guyana, adjacent Pará (Brazil) and possibly far southwestern Suriname, is also a matter of dispute, and many herpetologists, as well as many people keeping poison dart frogs in captivity, have not distinguished these, with all commonly being identified as "azureus". Members of the Dendrobatidae family, including D. tinctorius "azureus" have been used as a model organisms in the study of chytridiomycosis, a fungal disease that affects amphibians worldwide.

== Description ==
D. tinctorius "azureus" frog in captivity

The blue poison dart frog is a medium-sized poison dart frog that weighs about 8 g (0.28 oz) and grows to 3.0–4.5 cm (1.2–1.8 in) in snout–vent length. Females are larger and on average about half a centimetre longer than males, but males have larger toes. Its bright blue skin, usually darker around its limbs and stomach, serves as a warning to predators. The glands of poisonous alkaloids located in the skin serve as a defence mechanism to potential predators. The black spots are unique to each frog, enabling individuals to be identified. In addition to differing in color, blue poison dart frogs also tend to have a distinctive hunch-backed posture and a relatively smaller, more oval (less round) tympanum than in other variants of dyeing poison dart frog. Each foot has four toes, which each have a flattened tip with a suction cup pad used for gripping. The tips of the toes in females are round, while males have heart-shaped tips.

Their tadpoles have a long tail, about 6 mm, with a total length of around 10 mm. They lack legs and have gills instead of lungs.

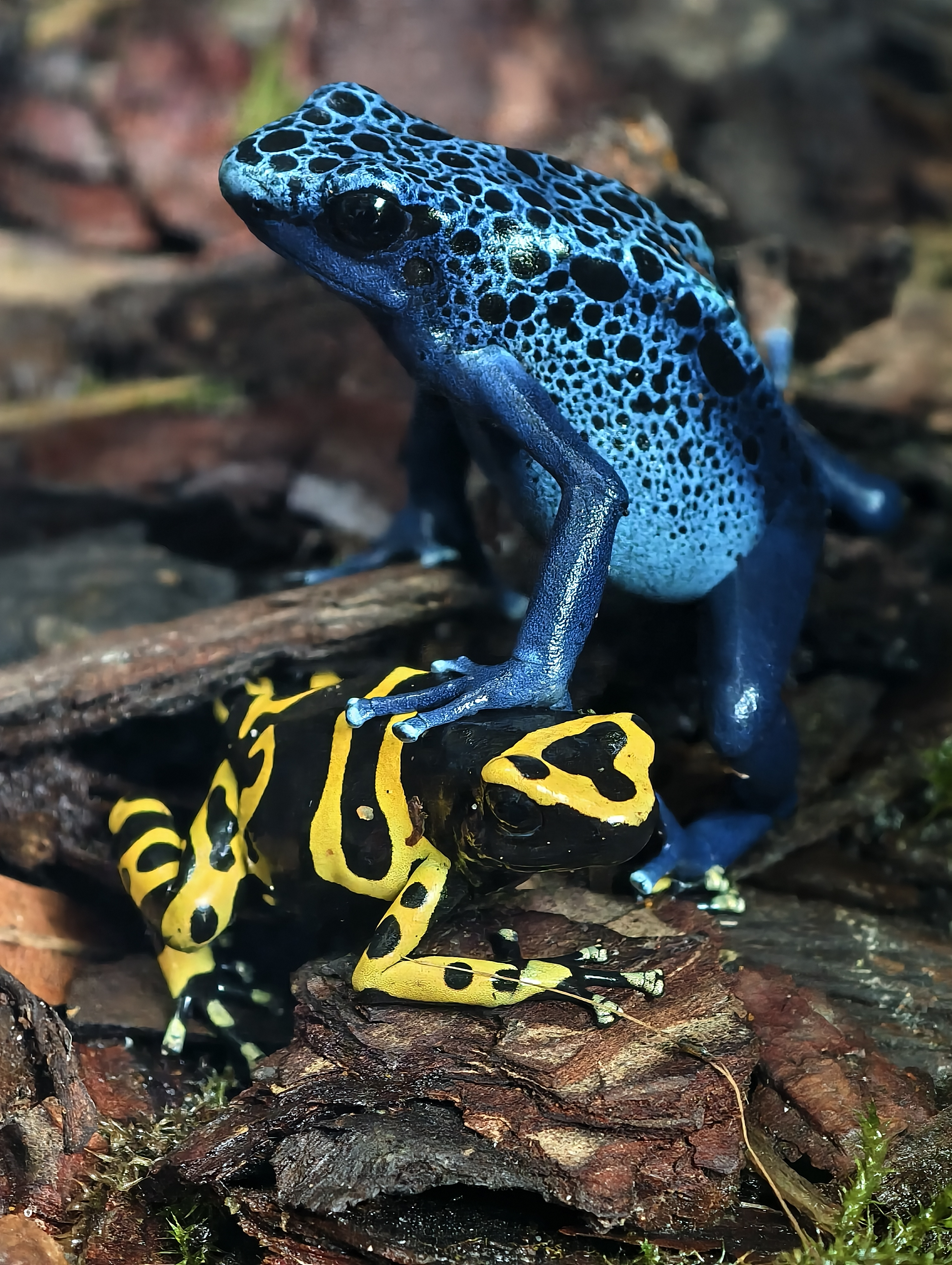
Blue poison dart frog (Dendrobates tinctorius) and Yellow-banded poison dart frog (Dendrobates leucomelas), Orientarium ZOO, Łódź, Poland

== Behavior ==
The blue poison dart frog is a terrestrial amphibian, and so generally remains close to a source of water. They spend most of their active hours hunting for insect prey, hopping in short leaps. They are very territorial and aggressive, towards both members of their own species, and others. This is typical of poison dart frog species. They employ a territorial threat display involving a number of techniques, including calls, chasing, and wrestling.

== Poison ==
The blue poison dart frog primarily employs pumiliotoxins (PTXs) to dissuade predation. PTXs are potent neurotoxins that disrupt neural signalling by binding to and forcing open ion channels, functionally disabling signalling potential. They are not as potent as the batrachotoxins employed by other species of poison dart frog (such as the golden poison dart frog), but are still sufficiently poisonous to discourage predation. There is a species of snake, the Northern redbelly, or fire-bellied snake, that has developed a resistance to these compounds.

Like all similar species, the blue poison dart frog does not produce the poison that it excretes onto its skin. Instead, they collect the poisons they use from the insects they prey on, in what is known as "sequestration". When bred in captivity, they will not develop poison, unless fed a diet including insects with the toxic alkaloid compounds they use. For the same reason, wild-caught poison dart frogs that are kept in captivity will become less poisonous over time.

Poison dart frogs can utilise anywhere from dozens to hundreds of compounds in their poison, most of which have yet to be catalogued or attributed to a dietary source. While they cannot produce toxic compounds, some species can alter the poisons they ingest to increase their toxicity. As a morph of the dyeing poison dart frog, blue poison dart frogs have this ability, being able to metabolise pumiliotoxin into allopumiliotoxin, a compound five times as potent.

Although poison dart frogs are so named for their use as a poison additive to darts and arrows by indigenous peoples, only certain species, namely from the genus Phyllobates, were ever actually used to this purpose.

== Reproduction ==
The blue poison dart frog breeds seasonally, usually during February or March when the weather is rainy. To find mates, the males sit on a rock and produce quiet calls, which the females follow to track down the males. The females then physically fight over a male. The male takes the female to a quiet place by the water, which becomes the site of the egg-laying. Fertilization occurs externally; once the eggs are laid, the male covers them in his sperm.

Between five and ten offspring are produced at each mating. Eggs are laid in the male's territory, which he defends. The male takes care of the eggs, sometimes joined by the female. The eggs hatch after 14 to 18 days, and after 10 to 12 weeks the tadpoles are fully mature. Both sexes reach sexual maturity at two years of age. The expected lifespan of D. tinctorius "azureus" is between 4 and 6 years in the wild and about 10 years in captivity.

== Feeding ==
The blue poison dart frog feeds on a wide variety of insect prey. In particular, fire ants and similar insects are believed to be the source of the poisonous compounds they excrete onto their skin. However, they have also been observed feeding on beetles, flies, mites, spiders, termites, maggots, and caterpillars. As mentioned above, without access to their natural insect prey, the blue poison dart frog will not develop their defensive poison coating.

== Captive care ==
In captivity, like most captive dart frogs, they eat a staple diet of fruit flies, pinhead crickets, rice flour beetle larvae, isopods, and springtails.

== Gallery ==
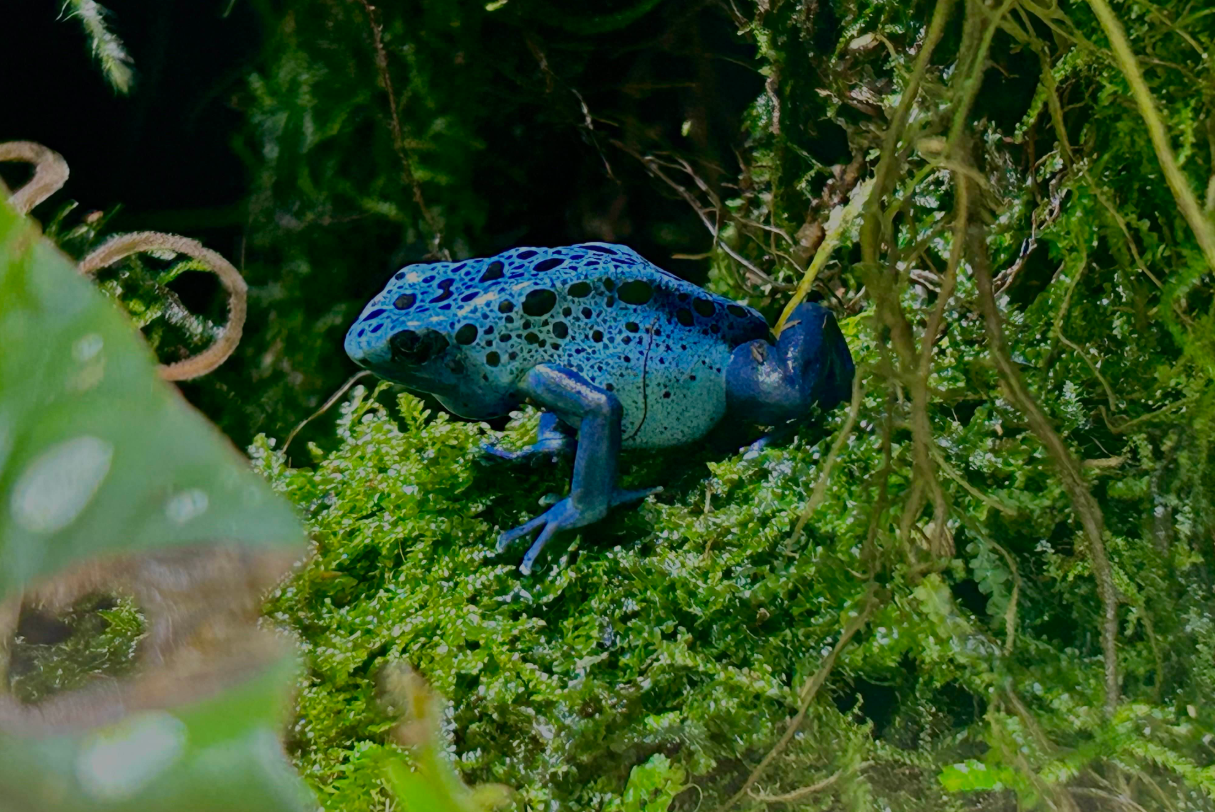
Blue Poison dart frog, Singapore ZOO

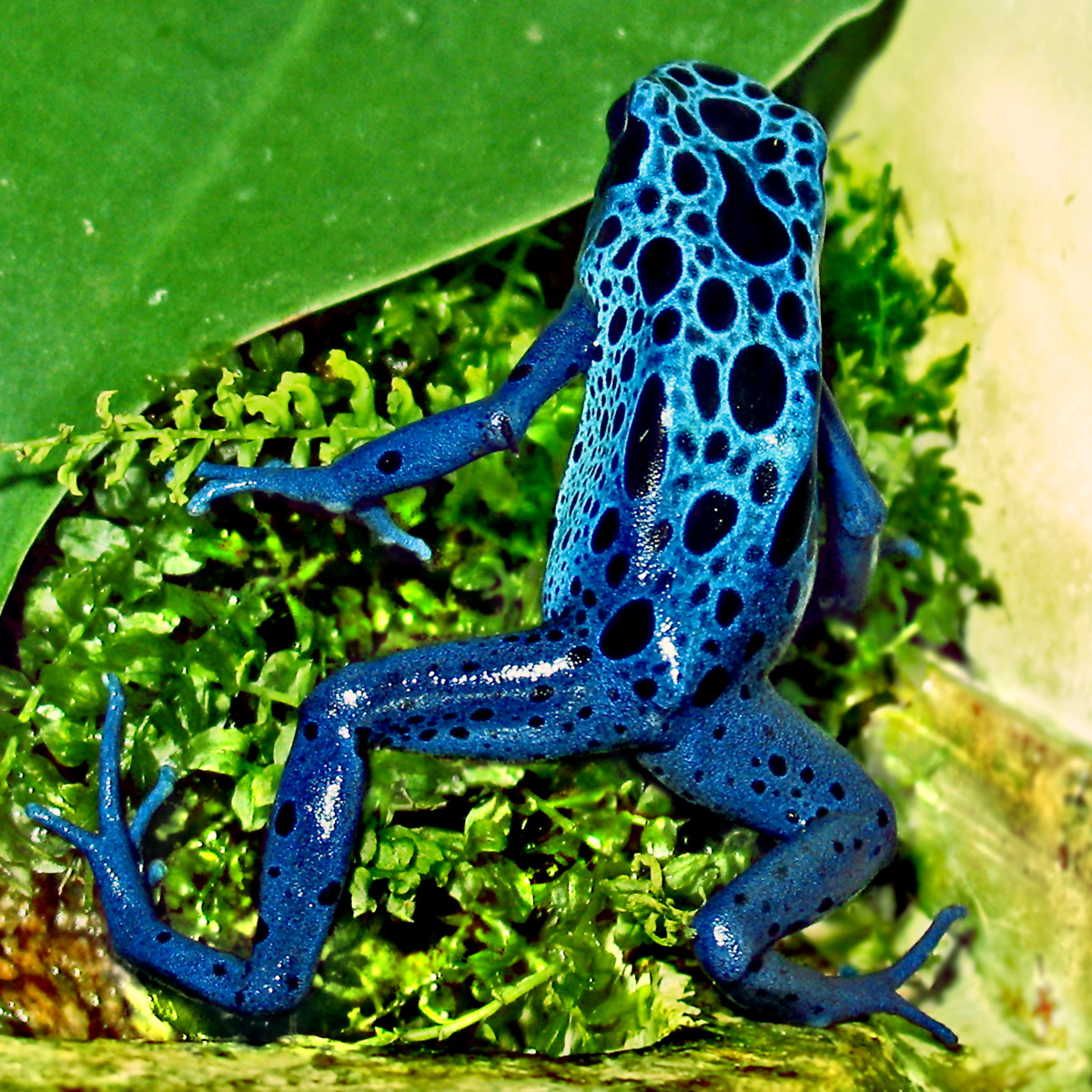
Blue poison dart frog

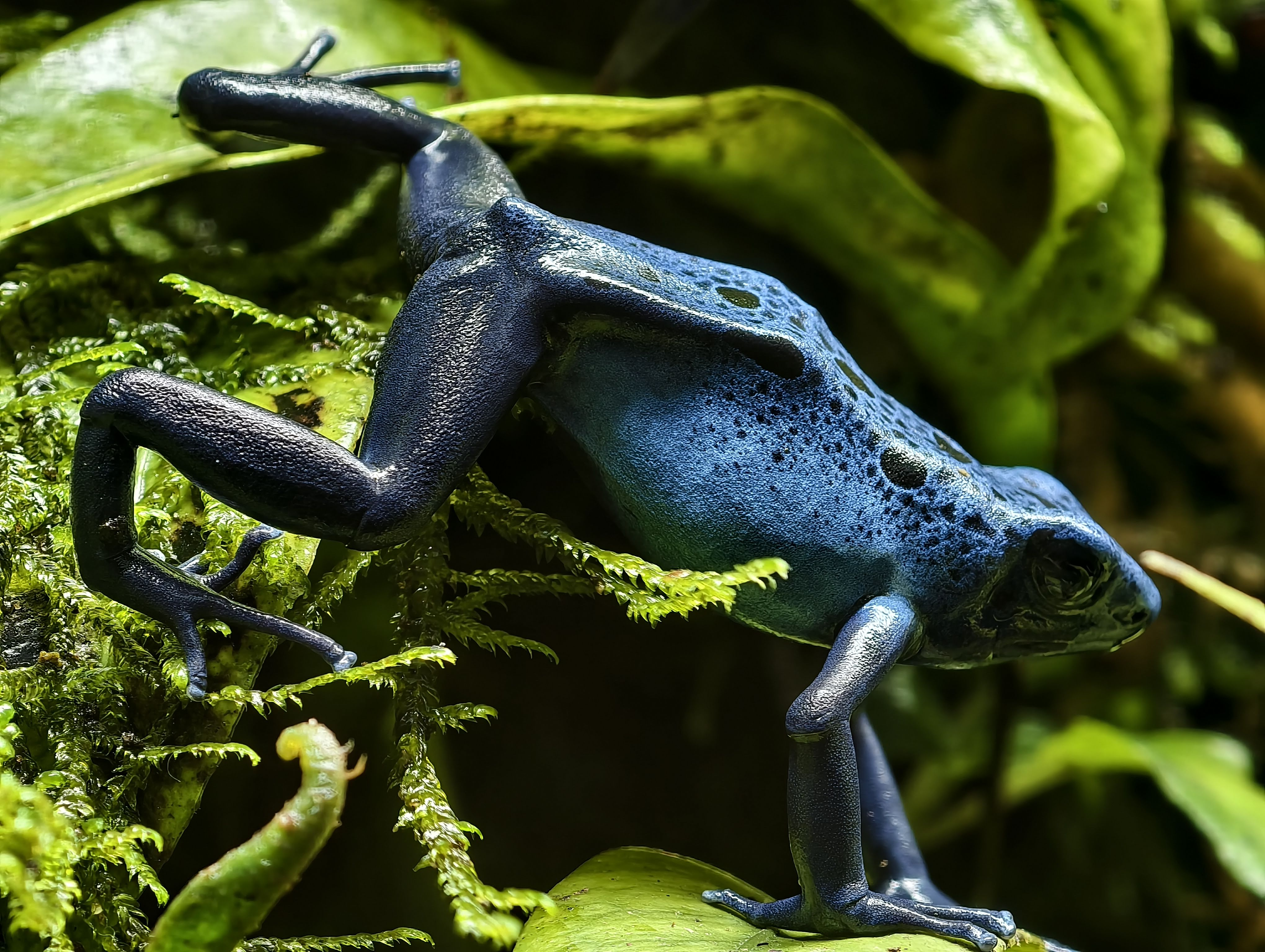
Blue poison dart frog, side view, London ZOO, UK

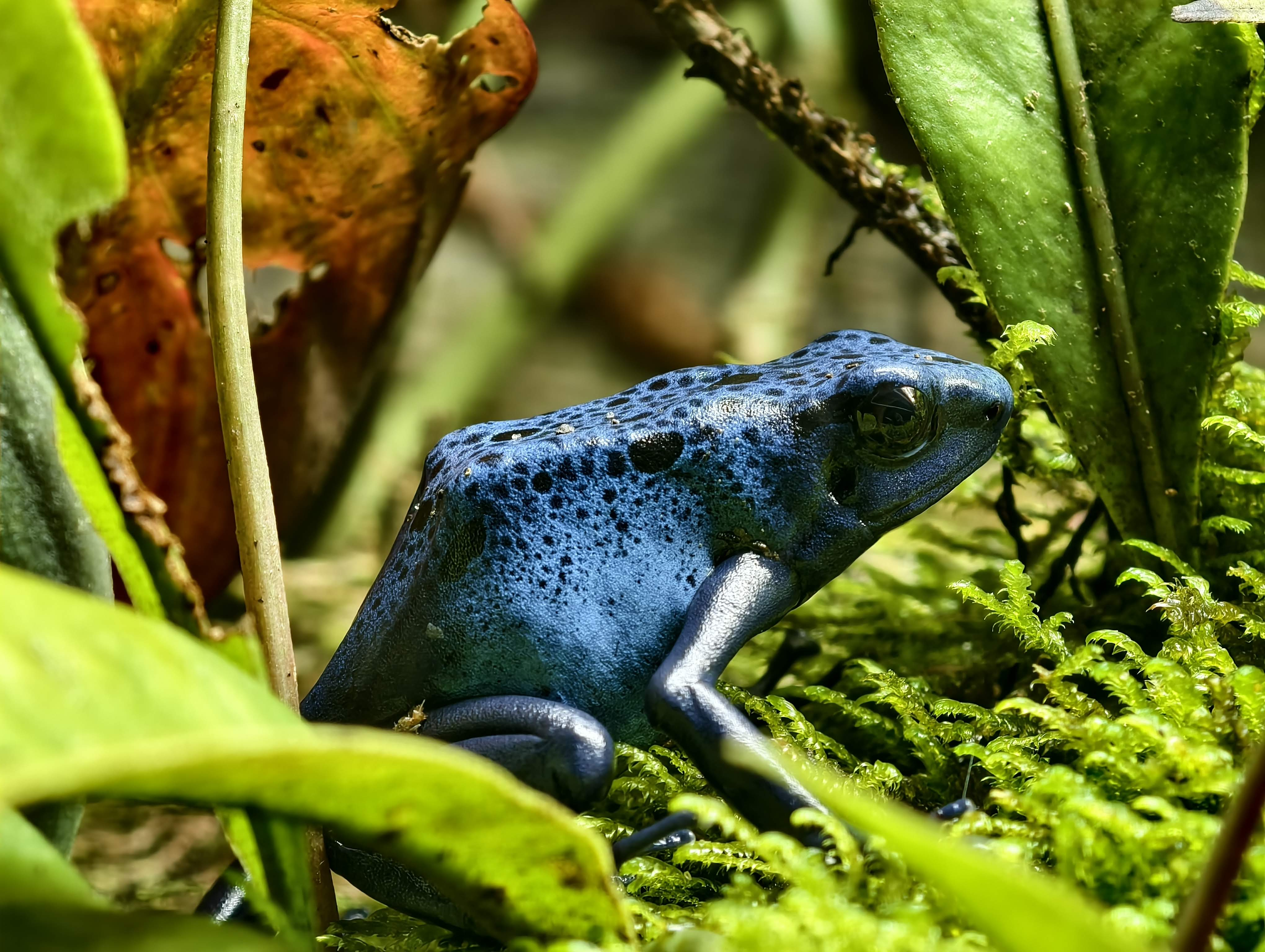
Blue poison dart frog, London ZOO, UK
