= Maintsokely =

- Location in Madagascar
- Coordinates: 16°24′S 48°11′E
- Country: Madagascar
- Region: Alaotra-Mangoro
- District: Andilamena
- Elevation: 459 m (1,506 ft)

Population (2001)
  - Total: 4,000
- Time zone: UTC3 (EAT)

Maintsokely is a town and commune (Malagasy: kaominina) in Madagascar. It belongs to the district of Andilamena, which is a part of Alaotra-Mangoro Region. The population of the commune was estimated to be approximately 4,000 in 2001 commune census.

Only primary schooling is available. The majority 70% of the population of the commune are farmers, while an additional 25% receives their livelihood from raising livestock. The most important crop is rice, while other important products are peanuts and sugarcane. Services provide employment for 5% of the population.
