= Antanimenabaka =

- Location in Madagascar
- Coordinates: 16°56′S 48°29′E
- Country: Madagascar
- Region: Alaotra-Mangoro
- District: Andilamena
- Elevation: 921 m (3,022 ft)

Population (2001)
  - Total: 15,000
- Time zone: UTC3 (EAT)

Antanimenabaka is a town and commune (Malagasy: kaominina) in Madagascar. It belongs to the district of Andilamena, which is a part of the Alaotra-Mangoro Region. The population of the commune was estimated to be approximately 15,000 in the 2001 commune census.

Primary and junior level secondary education are available in town. The majority of the commune’s population, 75%, are farmers, with another 20% earning their livelihood through livestock raising. The most important crop is rice, while other important products are peanuts, beans, maize and cassava. Services employ 5% of the population.

== Transport ==
- Route nationale 32
