= Miarinarivo, Andilamena =

Miarinarivo
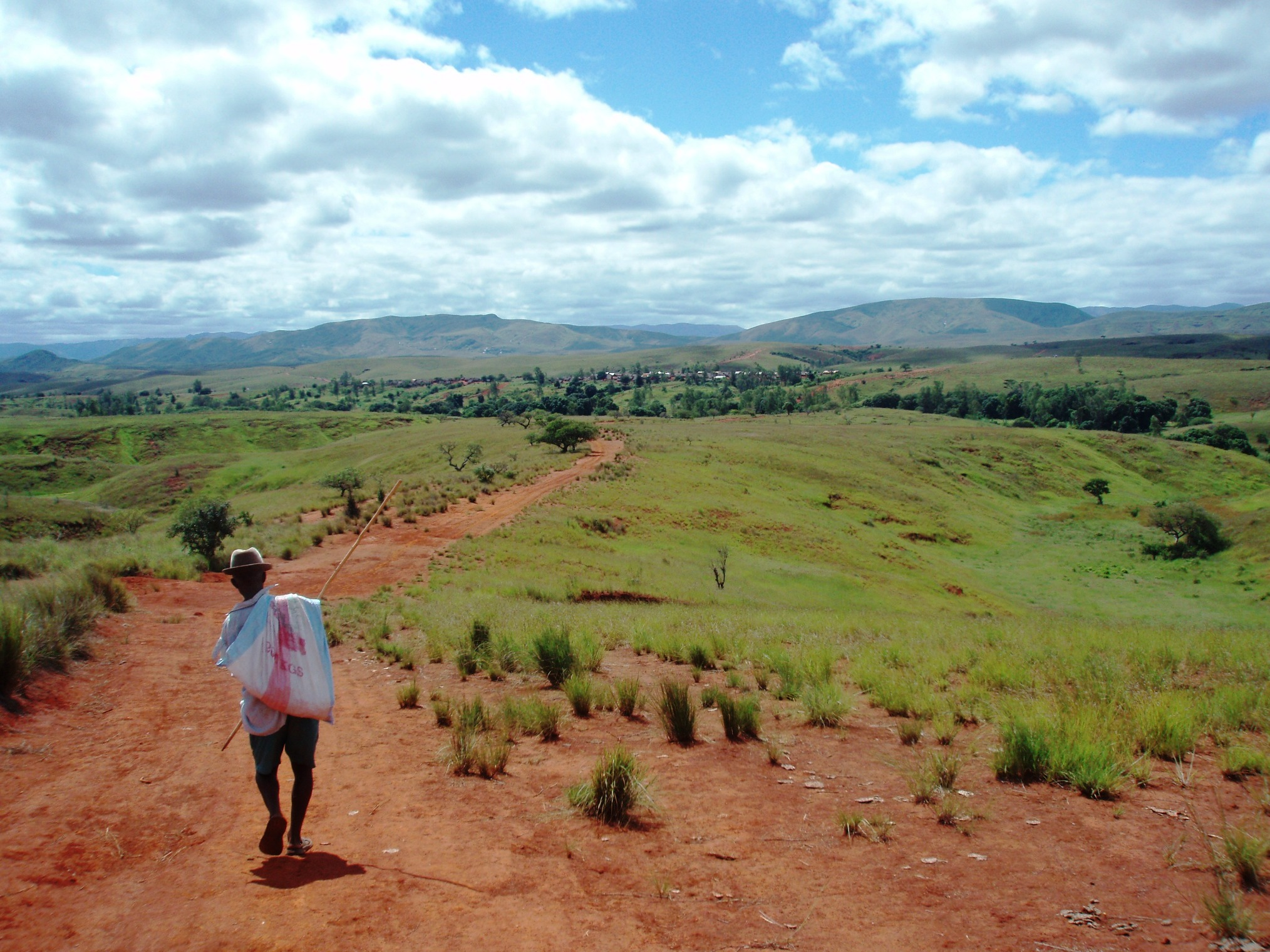
- Miarinarivo (Andilamena)

- Location in Madagascar
- Coordinates: 16°37′S 48°15′E
- Country: Madagascar
- Region: Alaotra-Mangoro
- District: Andilamena
- Elevation: 552 m (1,811 ft)

Population (2001)
  - Total: 14,000
- Time zone: UTC3 (EAT)

Miarinarivo is a town and commune (Malagasy: kaominina) in Madagascar, north east of Antananarivo (not to be confused with other towns by the same name in Madagascar.) It belongs to the district of Andilamena, which is a part of Alaotra-Mangoro Region. The population of the commune was estimated to be 14,000 in the 2001 commune census.

The town has both primary and junior level secondary schools. Farming provides employment for 20% of the working population and raising livestock 75%. As a result, cattle rustlers (Malagasy: dahalo) are active in the region. The most important crop is rice, while other important products are peanuts, cassava and sweet potatoes. Services provide employment for 5% of the population.
