= Tanananifololahy =

- Location in Madagascar
- Coordinates: 16°46′S 48°22′E
- Country: Madagascar
- Region: Alaotra-Mangoro
- District: Andilamena
- Elevation: 655 m (2,149 ft)

Population (2001)
  - Total: 5,000
- Time zone: UTC3 (EAT)

Tanananifololahy or Tanonanifololahy is a town and commune (Malagasy: kaominina) in Madagascar. It belongs to the district of Andilamena, which is a part of Alaotra-Mangoro Region. The population of the commune was estimated to be approximately 5,000 in 2001 commune census.

Only primary schooling is available. The majority 55% of the population of the commune are farmers, while an additional 40% receives their livelihood from raising livestock. The most important crop is rice, while other important products are peanuts, cassava and tomato. Services provide employment for 5% of the population.
