= Bemaitso =

- Location in Madagascar
- Coordinates: 17°4′S 48°30′E
- Country: Madagascar
- Region: Alaotra-Mangoro
- District: Andilamena
- Elevation: 949 m (3,114 ft)

Population (2001)
  - Total: 8,000
- Time zone: UTC3 (EAT)

Bemaitso is a town and commune (Malagasy: kaominina) in Madagascar. It belongs to the district of Andilamena, which is a part of Alaotra-Mangoro Region. The population of the commune was estimated to be approximately 8,000 in 2001 commune census.

Only primary schooling is available. The majority 75% of the population of the commune are farmers, while an additional 23% receives their livelihood from raising livestock. The most important crop is rice, while other important products are peanuts, beans and maize. Services provide employment for 2% of the population.
