= Maroadabo =

- Location in Madagascar
- Coordinates: 16°38′S 48°23′E
- Country: Madagascar
- Region: Alaotra-Mangoro
- District: Andilamena
- Elevation: 626 m (2,054 ft)

Population (2001)
  - Total: 4,000
- Time zone: UTC3 (EAT)

Maroadabo is a town and commune (Malagasy: kaominina) in Madagascar. It belongs to the district of Andilamena, which is a part of Alaotra-Mangoro Region. The population of the commune was estimated to be approximately 4,000 in the 2001 commune census.

Only primary schooling is available. Farming and raising livestock provides employment for 49% and 44% of the working population. The most important crop is rice, while other important products are peanuts and cassava. Services provide employment for 7% of the population.
