= Marovato, Andilamena =

Marovato
- Location in Madagascar
- Coordinates: 16°28′S 48°25′E
- Country: Madagascar
- Region: Alaotra-Mangoro
- District: Andilamena
- Elevation: 673 m (2,208 ft)

Population (2001)
  - Total: 4,000
- Time zone: UTC3 (EAT)

Marovato is a town and commune (Malagasy: kaominina) in Madagascar. It belongs to the district of Andilamena, which is a part of Alaotra-Mangoro Region. The population of the commune was estimated to be approximately 4,000 in 2001 commune census.

Only primary schooling is available. The majority 70% of the population of the commune are farmers, while an additional 29% receives their livelihood from raising livestock. The most important crop is rice, while other important products are peanuts, cassava and sweet potatoes. Services provide employment for 1% of the population.
