= Andilamena District =

Andilamena (district)
- Location in Madagascar
- Coordinates: 17°1′S 48°35′E
- Country: Madagascar
- Region: Alaotra-Mangoro
- District: Andilamena
- Elevation: 932 m (3,058 ft)
- Time zone: UTC3 (EAT)
- Postal code: 505
- Climate: Cwa

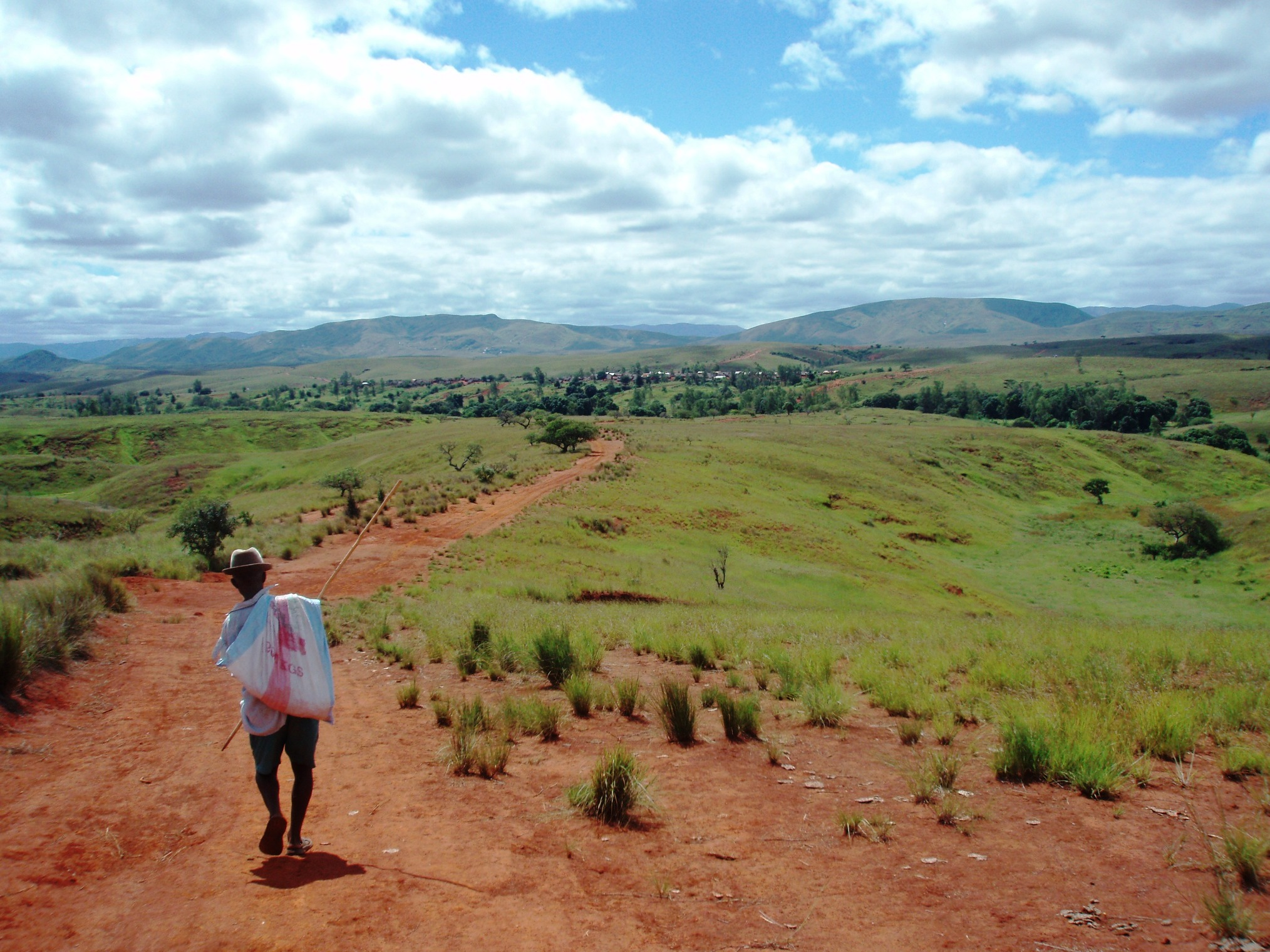
Typical landscape of the northern part of Andilamena District, in the background the village of Miarinarivo

Andilamena District is a district in the Alaotra-Mangoro region in Madagascar. Its capital is Andilamena.

== Communes ==
The district is divided into eight communes:

- Andilamena
- Antanimenabaka
- Bemaitso
- Maintsokely
- Maroadabo
- Marovato
- Miarinarivo
- Tanananifololahy
