= Pumiliotoxin 251D =

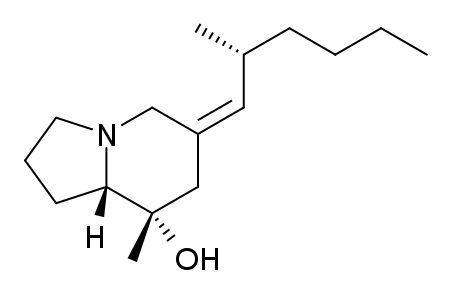

Names
- Preferred IUPAC name (6Z,8S,8aS)-8-Methyl-6-[(2R)-2-methylhexylidene]octahydroindolizin-8-ol
- Other names Pumiliotoxin 251D

Identifiers
CAS Number	73376-35-9
3D model (JSmol)	Interactive image
ChEMBL	ChEMBL358960
ChemSpider	4944741
KEGG	C20031
PubChem CID	6440480
UNII	P2LPB87CKN
- InChI: InChI=1S/C16H29NO/c1-4-5-7-13(2)10-14-11-16(3,18)15-8-6-9-17(15)12-14/h10,13,15,18H,4-9,11-12H2,1-3H3/b14-10-/t13-,15+,16+/m1/s1 Key: OKTQTXDNHCOLHT-AJKPHIATSA-N; InChI=1/C16H29NO/c1-4-5-7-13(2)10-14-11-16(3,18)15-8-6-9-17(15)12-14/h10,13,15,18H,4-9,11-12H2,1-3H3/b14-10-/t13-,15+,16+/m1/s1 Key: OKTQTXDNHCOLHT-AJKPHIATBP
- SMILES: O[C@]1(CC(=C\[C@H](C)CCCC)\CN2[C@H]1CCC2)C

Properties
Chemical formula	C_{16}H_{29}NO
Molar mass	251.414 g·mol^{−1}

Hazards
- Occupational safety and health (OHS/OSH)
Main hazards	Toxic
- Except where otherwise noted, data are given for materials in their standard state (at 25 °C [77 °F], 100 kPa). verify (what is ?) Infobox references

Pumiliotoxin 251D is a toxic organic compound. It is found in the skin of poison frogs from the genera Dendrobates, Epipedobates, Minyobates, and Phyllobates and toads from the genus Melanophryniscus. Its name comes from the pumiliotoxin family (PTXs) and its molecular mass of 251 daltons. When the toxin enters the bloodstream through cuts in the skin or by ingestion, it can cause hyperactivity, convulsions, cardiac arrest and ultimately death. It is especially toxic to arthropods (e.g. mosquitoes), even at low (naturally occurring) concentrations.

== Chemical properties ==
=== Structure ===
The chiral centers in pumiliotoxin 251D can give several stereoisomers of the compound. Only one form of the toxin is present in nature and has toxic properties.

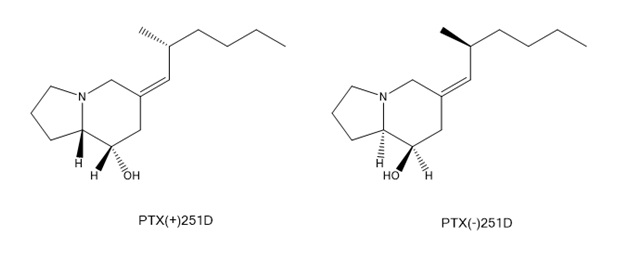

Two enantiomers of pumiliotoxin 251D. On the left the plus enantiomer is shown which is toxic. On the right side the minus enantiomer, which is not toxic, is shown.

The side chain conformation of substituents at the C-2’ position plays an important role in the toxicity of the compound.

=== Synthesis ===
The synthesis of pumiliotoxin 251D is quite complex and contains multiple steps. It can be achieved starting from the N-Boc derivative of L-proline methyl ester.

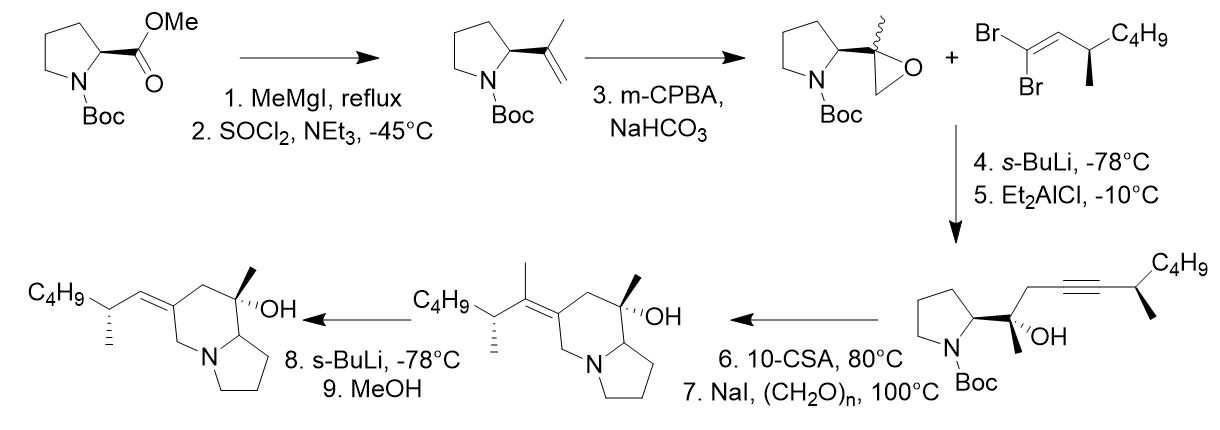

Pumiliotoxin (−)-251D can be synthesized in a similar way with minor alterations to the overall synthesis.

== Toxicity ==
=== Mechanism of action ===
In general, pumiliotoxins are known as positive modulators of voltage-gated sodium channels (VGSCs, membrane proteins). Pumiliotoxin 251D is not such a poison. However, it does block the influx of Na^{+} ions in mammalian VGSCs.

Pumiliotoxin 251D is able to shift the V1/2. This is the potential at which the sodium open probability is half maximal. Both the steady-state activation and inactivation curves of each mammalian VGSCs are shifted to a more negative potential.

PTX 251D shifts the V1/2 of insect VGSCs even further than the mammalian VSGCs. This explains why it is especially toxic to insects, like mosquitoes. Furthermore, the presence of PTX 251D results in a six time higher permeability of the VGSCs for K^{+} ions. This severely disturbs the delicate sodium-potassium equilibrium in the nerve system.

The effect of pumiliotoxin 251D on the voltage-gated potassium channels (VGPCs) currents is quite small. The toxic has an effect on the deactivation kinetics of the potassium channel. It inhibits its inactivation. This effect is still under investigation.

PTX 251D also completely inhibits the activity of Ca^{2+}-stimulated ATPase. This results in a decreased reuptake of Ca^{2+} and thus a high concentration of free Ca^{2+} in the organism. This may be related to the potentiation and prolongation of muscle twitch caused by the inhibition.

The mechanism of biotransformation of PTX 251D is still unknown.

=== Effects ===
Pumiliotoxin is a toxin found in poison dart frogs (genus Dendrobates and Phyllobates). It affects the calcium channels, interfering with muscle contraction in the heart and skeletal muscle.

PTX 251D has several effects. It rapidly induces convulsions and death to mice and insects (LD50 being, respectively, 10 mg/kg and 150 ng/larvae). These convulsions are the result of the uncontrollable distortion of the sodium-potassium equilibrium in the neurons. This is caused by the inhibition of the VGSCs.

It also acts as cardiac depressor, causing cardiac arrest. This can be explained by its negative effect on the cardiac VGSC hNav1.5/β1.

Although nothing is known of how well PTX 251D penetrates into the brain where convulsions are originated, the observation of convulsions can be explained through inhibition of VGPCs.

=== Treatment ===
Symptomatic treatment of PTX 251D poisoning include reducing the convulsions using carbamazepine. This drug targets the affected VGSCs. Phenobarbital also shows positive effects by interacting with the affected Ca^{2+} channels. Ineffective drugs include diazepam and dizocilpine.
