= Ambohibary =

- Location in Madagascar
- Coordinates: 18°54′S 48°14′E
- Country: Madagascar
- Region: Alaotra-Mangoro
- District: Moramanga

Area
  - Total: 970 km^{2} (370 sq mi)
- Elevation: 1,700 m (5,600 ft)

Population (2018)
  - Total: 35,923
- Time zone: UTC3 (EAT)
- Postal code: 514

Ambohibary is a rural commune in Madagascar. It belongs to the district of Moramanga, which is a part of Alaotra-Mangoro Region. It is situated 20 km from Moramanga. The population of the commune was 35,923 in 2018.

Primary and junior level secondary education are available in town. The majority 93% of the population of the commune are farmers. The most important crop is rice, while other important products are bananas, beans and cassava. Services provide employment for 7% of the population.

== Roads ==
The commune is situated along the National Road 44.

== Industries ==
- Usine Militaire de Moramanga: In Ambohibary is situated the only armament factory of Madagascar.
- Ambatovy mine - cobalt & nickel mine

== Climate ==
Climate data for Ambohibary, Madagascar (1933-1940)
Month	Jan	Feb	Mar	Apr	May	Jun	Jul	Aug	Sep	Oct	Nov	Dec	Year
Record high °C (°F)	27.8 (82.0)	27.6 (81.7)	27.0 (80.6)	26.3 (79.3)	26.0 (78.8)	23.7 (74.7)	24.2 (75.6)	26.6 (79.9)	28.6 (83.5)	30.4 (86.7)	30.0 (86.0)	31.0 (87.8)	31.0 (87.8)
Mean daily maximum °C (°F)	23.8 (74.8)	23.9 (75.0)	23.6 (74.5)	22.5 (72.5)	21.1 (70.0)	18.6 (65.5)	18.9 (66.0)	19.8 (67.6)	22.5 (72.5)	24.9 (76.8)	24.8 (76.6)	24.1 (75.4)	22.4 (72.3)
Daily mean °C (°F)	19.0 (66.2)	19.2 (66.6)	18.6 (65.5)	17.1 (62.8)	14.7 (58.5)	12.7 (54.9)	12.3 (54.1)	12.8 (55.0)	14.7 (58.5)	16.7 (62.1)	18.0 (64.4)	18.7 (65.7)	16.2 (61.2)
Mean daily minimum °C (°F)	14.1 (57.4)	14.4 (57.9)	13.5 (56.3)	11.7 (53.1)	8.2 (46.8)	6.7 (44.1)	5.6 (42.1)	5.8 (42.4)	7.0 (44.6)	8.5 (47.3)	11.3 (52.3)	13.3 (55.9)	10.0 (50.0)
Record low °C (°F)	9.0 (48.2)	9.0 (48.2)	7.5 (45.5)	4.0 (39.2)	0.2 (32.4)	−2.2 (28.0)	−0.5 (31.1)	−4.4 (24.1)	−2.3 (27.9)	−0.5 (31.1)	3.5 (38.3)	7.5 (45.5)	−4.4 (24.1)
Average rainfall mm (inches)	260.6 (10.26)	267.5 (10.53)	169.5 (6.67)	106.2 (4.18)	28.3 (1.11)	20.3 (0.80)	15.0 (0.59)	21.7 (0.85)	20.1 (0.79)	66.1 (2.60)	208.1 (8.19)	323.2 (12.72)	1,506.6 (59.29)
Average rainy days	24.2	20.1	20.1	16.8	10.1	12.5	10.3	9.3	5.9	9.1	19.3	25.6	183.4
Source: NOAA
