= Andilamena =

- Location in Madagascar
- Coordinates: 17°1′S 48°35′E
- Country: Madagascar
- Region: Alaotra-Mangoro
- District: Andilamena
- Elevation: 932 m (3,058 ft)

Population (2018)
  - Total: 37,229
- Time zone: UTC3 (EAT)
- Postal code: 505
- Climate: Cwa

Andilamena is a rural commune in Madagascar. It belongs to the district of Andilamena, which is a part of Alaotra-Mangoro Region. The population of the commune was 37,229 in 2018.

In addition to primary schooling the town offers secondary education at both junior and senior levels. The town provides access to hospital services to its citizens. The majority 65% of the population of the commune are farmers, while an additional 10% receives their livelihood from raising livestock. The most important crop is rice, while other important products are peanuts, maize and cassava. Industry and services provide employment for 1% and 24% of the population, respectively.

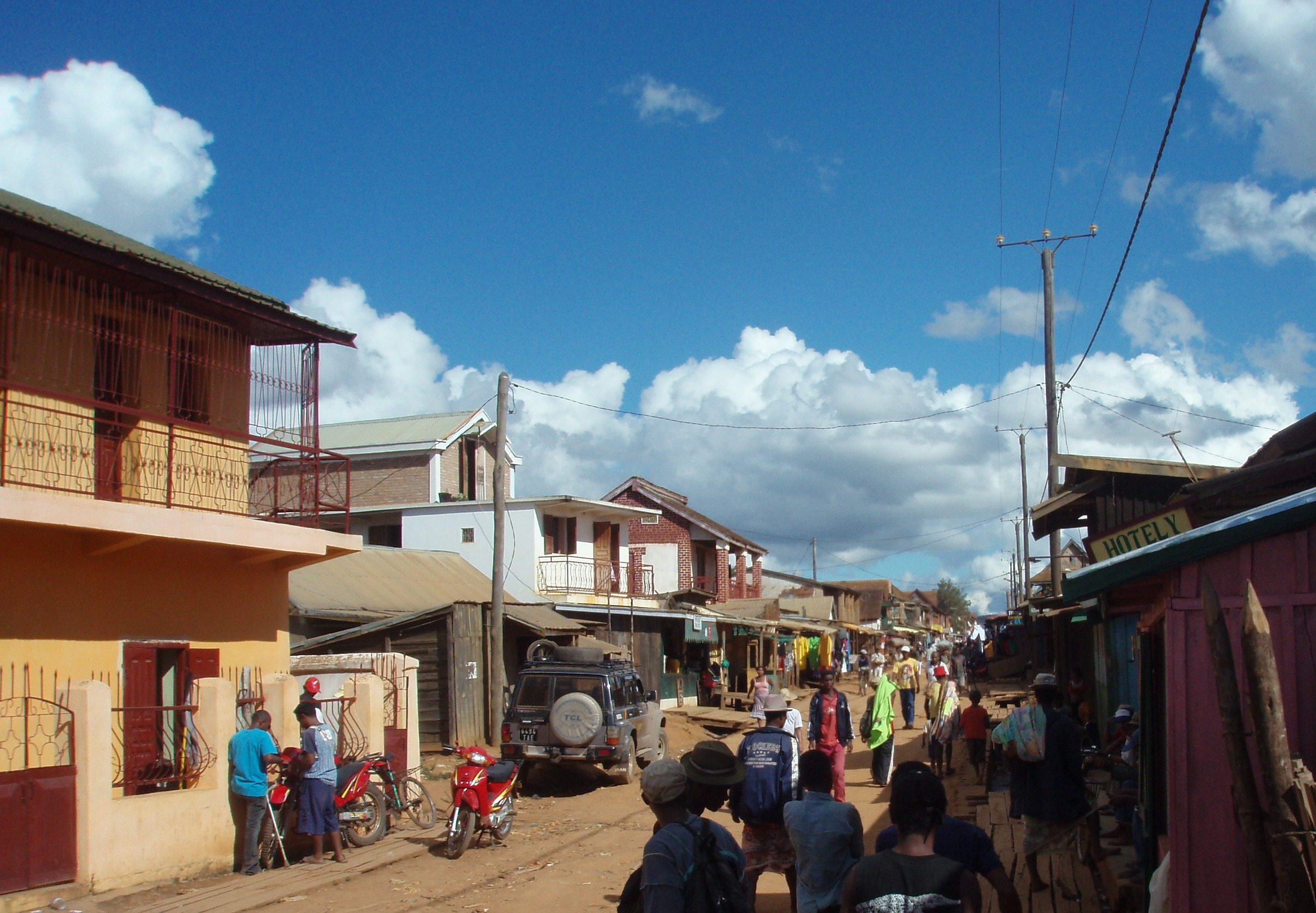
Main street in Andilamena

== History ==
Andilamena, it is at this place, in October 2000, where an important ruby deposit was discovered. It caused a rush that definitely transformed this big rural village lost in the middle of nowhere. In 2002, a new sapphire deposit was discovered at a place called Andribabe. Some remarkable samples of royal blue color remind those of Burma. In November 2013 a new sapphire and ruby deposit was discovered at the place said Sahalava, 30 kilometers north of Andilamena.
