= Allopumiliotoxin =

Group of chemical compounds

Allopumiliotoxin 267A

Allopumiliotoxins are a structural division in the pumiliotoxin-A class of alkaloids. The compounds of the pumiliotoxin-A class are primarily found in the skins of frogs, toads, and other amphibians and are used as a chemical defense mechanism to ward off predators, microorganisms, and ectoparasites. The compounds were originally discovered in neotropical dendrobatid frogs, but are also found in the mantellid frogs of Madagascar, myobatrachid frogs of Australia, and bufonid toad of South America. Frogs possessing this defense mechanism have aposematic coloring.

== Biological activity ==
The poison-dart frog family Dendrobatidae has yielded many different alkaloids categorized into several different classes, almost all of which have shown high pharmacological activity on muscle and nerve cells.

The pumiliotoxin-A class, specifically, contains many molecules which have had a favorable effect on the heart. Allopumiliotoxins, the most complex member of this class, have a wide range of biological activities, the full understanding of which has not been fully discerned due their incredible complexity and subsequent synthetic difficulties. Among allopumiliotoxins, those with a β-oriented C-7 hydroxyl group have shown greater activity in comparison to α-epimers of this position. Allopumiliotoxin 339A has been shown to stimulate sodium influx and phosphoinositide breakdown in the cerebral cortical synaptoneurosomes of guinea pigs and is one of the most active allopumiliotoxins. It is more biologically active than pumiliotoxin B, which has had similar biological effects on the secondary messenger system, causing muscle rigidity and some favorable effects on the heart.

Pumiliotoxins and allopumiliotoxins are very toxic in general. Pumiliotoxin B has caused death in mice when 20 μg was given in injections below the skin

== Isolation ==
As stated previously, these alkaloids were first discovered in the skins of frogs. They can be isolated from the frog’s skin by mincing the skin and extracting the compounds by trituration. A series of extractions involving an acid-base extraction are needed to isolate the allopumiliotoxins. The skins of the frogs may contain a number of different allopumiliotoxins. For example, the skin of Dendrobates tricolor was found to contain alkaloids 251D, 271, 341A, and 323B. Also, different frogs contain different alkaloids in their skin. Dendrobates auratus, for example, was found to contain (+)-allopumiliotoxin 339A (a compound not present in the skin of Dendrobates tricolor).

== Synthesis ==
Allopumiliotoxins are very biologically useful but are rare in nature. For this reason, many groups have researched syntheses for various alkaloids of this type. The main problem with allopumiliotoxin synthesis arises from the alkylidene side chain because the stereochemistry of it can be difficult to control by Wittig-type functionalizations.

Total synthesis of (+)-allopumiliotoxin 267A was achieved using a chiral dihydropyridone intermediate that was formed from the addition of ethyl lithiopropiolate to the N-acylpyridinium salt which results from the reaction of (+)-trans-2-(α-cumyl)cyclohexyl chloroformate and 4-methoxy-3-methyl-5(triisopropylsilyl)pyridine. This intermediate was then subjected to various additions and oxidations to yield the final allopumiliotoxin. The synthesis of (+)-allopumiliotoxin 323B’ has also been achieved using an intermediate from the previous synthesis.

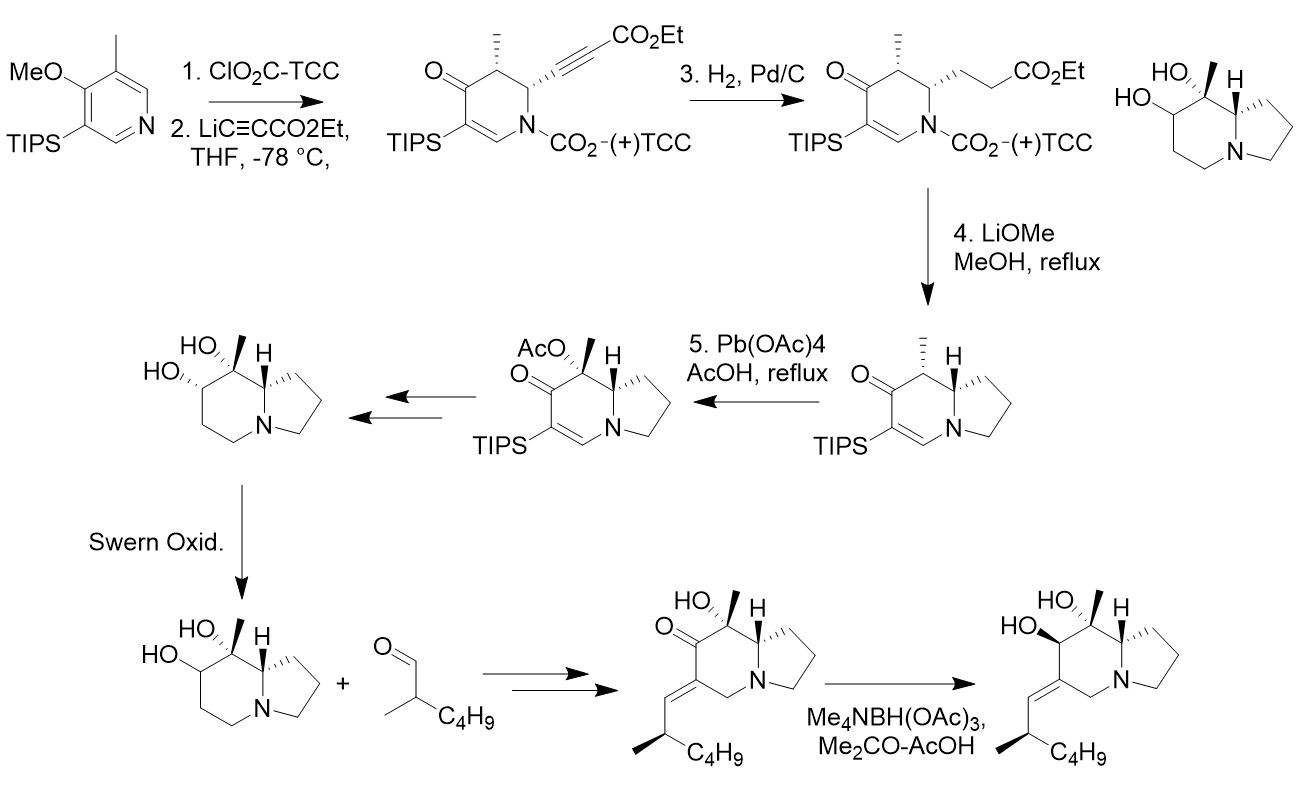

(+)-Allopumiliotoxin 339A has been synthesized using an iodide-promoted iminium ion alkyne cyclization followed by condensation with acetylenic salt. Subsequent reactions led to the enantiopure product after 16 steps and a 7.5% yield. Other synthetic methods have been carried out for this molecule. One of which was achieved through the use of a Nozaki-Kishi Cyclization. Allopumiliotoxin 267A was synthesized using a similar cyclization.

== Analysis ==
The pumiliotoxin-A class compounds are typically analyzed by GC-MS because the different classes show different prominent peaks. Allopumiliotoxins show corresponding ions of C_{4}H_{8}N^{+}(m/z 70) and C_{10}H_{16}NO_{2}^{+}(m/z 182). The mass spectra of pumiliotoxins show prominent ions of C_{4}H_{8}N^{+} (m/z 70) and C_{10}H_{16}NO^{+} (m/z 166). Homopumiliotoxins exhibit prominent mass spectral fragment ions of C_{5}H_{10}N^{+} (m/z 84) and C_{11}H_{18}NO^{+} (m/z 180).

== See also ==
- Pumiliotoxins
- Alkaloids
- Dendrobates
