= Pumiliotoxin =

Group of chemical compounds

Pumiliotoxin A: R = –H Pumiliotoxin B: R = –OH

Pumiliotoxins (PTXs), are one of several toxins found in the skin of poison dart frogs. The frog species, P. bibronii also produces PTXs to deter predators. Closely related, though more toxic, are allopumiliotoxins, (aPTXs). Other toxins found in the skin of poison frogs include decahydroquinolines (DHQs), izidines, coccinellines, and spiropyrrolizidine alkaloids. Pumiliotoxins are poisonous in high concentrations. Pumiliotoxins are much weaker than batrachotoxins, ranging between 100 and 1000 times less poisonous.

== Structure ==
The different divisions of compounds in the pumiliotoxin-A class arise from differences in the carbon backbone and/or the substituents attached to it. The difference between allopumiliotoxins and pumiliotoxins occurs at the 7 position. At this position, pumiliotoxins have a hydrogen whereas allopumiliotoxins have a hydroxyl substituent. Both have methyl and hydroxyl groups at the C-8 position. Homopumiliotoxins contain a quinolizidine ring in the place of the indolizidine ring and methyl and hydroxyl groups at its C-9 position. All three contain an alkylidenyl side-chain.

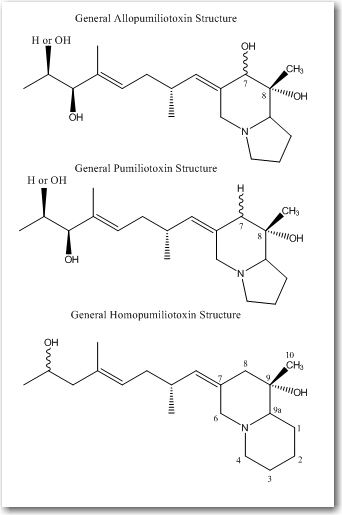
General Structures

== Nomenclature ==
Pumiliotoxins (or their analogs, allopumiliotoxins and homopumiliotoxins) are named by their class followed by their molecular weight. Isomers are differentiated by a letter after the number. For example, allopumiliotoxin 339A is an allopumiliotoxin with a molecular weight of 339 g/mol, with an axially oriented hydroxyl group at the 7-position in the indolizidine nucleus that differentiates it from allopumiliotoxin 339B. A (+) or (−) sign preceding the name of a pumiliotoxin refers to the compound's rotation of polarized light, with clockwise rotation (dextrorotatation) denoted with (+) and counterclockwise rotation (levorotation) denoted with (-).

== Accumulation ==
Frogs obtain pumiliotoxins from their diet in arthropods; frogs raised in terrariums in the absence of their natural diet do not produce alkaloids. The toxins are then accumulated in secretory granular glands of the skin of the frog. Some frog species of the Dendrobates genera can convert pumiliotoxins into allopumiliotoxins by a hydroxylase. Only one of the enantiomers can be hydroxylated to this more potent form of the toxin.

The lack of pumiliotoxin 251D in eggs and tadpoles show that the toxin is not passed over from adult frogs to their offspring. The tadpoles are therefore not readily protected from predators.

== Physiological Effects ==
Pumiliotoxins and allopumiliotoxins are generally positive modulators of voltage gated sodium channels and increase the strength of heart contraction. One exception is pumiliotoxin 251D, which blocks the flux of Na^{+} ions and increases the permeability of K^{+} ions.

== See also ==
- Allopumiliotoxin
- Histrionicotoxin
- Pumiliotoxin 251D
