= Bamboo lemur =

Bamboo lemurs
- Lac Alaotra bamboo lemur (Hapalemur alaotrensis)

Conservation status
- CITES Appendix I

Scientific classification
- Kingdom: Animalia
- Phylum: Chordata
- Class: Mammalia
- Order: Primates
- Suborder: Strepsirrhini
- Family: Lemuridae
- Genus: Hapalemur; I. Geoffroy, 1851

Type species
- Lemur griseus É. Geoffroy, 1812 ( = Lemur griseus Link, 1795)

Species
- Hapalemur alaotrensis Hapalemur aureus Hapalemur griseus Hapalemur meridionalis Hapalemur occidentalis
- Combined distribution of Hapalemur

Synonyms
- Hapalolemur Giebel, 1855; Myoxicebus Elliot, 1913

Genus of lemurs

The bamboo lemurs or gentle lemurs are five species and three subspecies of lemur belonging to the genus Hapalemur. These medium-sized strepsirrhine primates occur exclusively on Madagascar, where they are found throughout the eastern tropical moist broadleaf forests from the far north to the extreme south, as well as in the dry deciduous forests of the northwest coast. Head-body lengths range between 27 and 40 centimeters (11 and 16 in), with tails varying between 35 and 41 cm (14 and 16 in). Body weights fall between 0.7 and 1.55 kilograms (1.5 and 3.4 lb), with the golden bamboo lemur (H. aureus) being the heaviest and two eastern lesser bamboo lemur subspecies (H. griseus griseus and H. g. ranomafanensis) being the lightest. Some species exhibit sexual dimorphism, while others do not. Most bamboo lemur species have gray or brown fur colorations, with the head being of a lighter shade than the body.

As arboreal animals, bamboo lemurs dwell in the low- and mid-canopy layers of their forested habitats, where they travel between trees and bamboo stalks with a method of locomotion known as vertical clinging and leaping. They live in small social groups that can be between two and 11 individuals, with group sizes varying between species. Activity patterns are also species-dependent, as some taxa are diurnal, while others can be cathemeral. Most bamboo lemur species subsist on diets predominately composed of bamboo, although other food items such as fruit, flowers, and fungi can also be consumed. Along with the greater bamboo lemur of the monotypic genus Prolemur, the bamboo lemurs of Hapalemur are the only primates that are bamboo specialists. The exception to this pattern is the Lac Alaotra bamboo lemur (H. alatorensis), which maintains a diet devoid of bamboo, instead consuming papyrus, reeds, and sedges. The golden bamboo lemur and eastern lesser bamboo lemur (H. griseus) consume large quantities of cyanide in their diets as a result of their preference for the Madagascar giant bamboo (Cathariostachys madagascariensis).

Most bamboo lemurs are classified as vulnerable by the IUCN Red List, with the exception of the Lac Alaotra bamboo lemur and golden bamboo lemur, which are classified as critically endangered species, and Gilbert's bamboo lemur (H. griseus gilberti), which is deemed to be data deficient. Threats faced by bamboo lemur include anthropogenic habitat destruction due to agricultural expansion and illegal logging and mining, as well as poaching for meat and as retribution for crop raiding. Bamboo lemurs are also subject to live capture for the exotic pet trade. Traditional taboos in Malagasy culture that prohibit the hunting or consumption of bamboo lemurs have recently diminished in effectiveness. Only three bamboo lemur taxa are known to currently exist in captivity.

== Etymology ==
Bamboo lemurs were first described by French zoologist Isidore Geoffroy Saint-Hilaire in 1851. Comparing their small size, proportions, speckled fur, and other traits to those of marmosets—then classified in the genus Hapale—he named the genus Hapalemur. Hapale derives from the Greek word ἁπαλός (hapalos), meaning "gentle".

In their discussion of lemur name etymologies, Dunkel et al. speculated that the once popular vernacular name for the genus, "gentle lemur," derived from the translation of Hapalemur, despite their notoriety for being one of the most aggressive lemurs in captivity—an observation first noted in a letter by Dutch naturalist François Pollen in 1895. The common name "bamboo lemur" first appeared in the mid- to late-1980s following the rediscovery of the greater bamboo lemur (Hapalemur [recte Prolemur] simus). "Bamboo lemur" became more generally used following the discovery of the golden bamboo lemur (Hapalemur aureus) in 1987. Both names were used until "bamboo lemur" became the preferred term in 1994, with the publication of the first edition of Lemurs of Madagascar. The term "gentle lemur" has seen little use in both popular and academic literature since the early 2000s.

Various names have been applied to the bamboo lemurs in Malagasy. Some employ the terms volo, meaning "bamboo," and/or boko, meaning "abdomen," such as bokombolo, which refers to the western lesser bamboo lemur (H. occidentalis) and all subspecies of the eastern lesser bamboo lemur (H. griseus ssp.). This is also seen in the golden bamboo lemur's bokombolo mena and vari bolo mena, both of which translate to "red bamboo lemur," with mena meaning "red" and vàri meaning "lemur." The western lesser bamboo lemur is also called ankomba valiha, with ankomba being an alternative word for "lemur," and valiha meaning "bamboo tube." The southern lesser bamboo lemur (H. meridionalis) is called halo, meaning "nakedness." The Lac Alaotra bamboo lemur (H. alaotrensis) is called bandro, which may be related to the term bandrolahy, meaning "male youths of the same age."

Other Malagasy names for bamboo lemurs include kotrika (H. griseus ssp.), kontè (H. g. griseus in the Ambalarondra region), and bekola, kofiy, and kitronytrony (H. occidentalis).

== Taxonomy ==
The bamboo lemurs of Hapalemur form a clade with Lemur and Prolemur within Lemuridae to the exclusion of Eulemur and Varecia. Within this clade, Hapalemur is excluded by a smaller clade consisting of Lemur and Prolemur.

=== Taxonomic classification ===
Five species and three subspecies comprise the genus Hapalemur.

- Family Lemuridae
  - Genus Eulemur: true lemurs
  - Genus Lemur: the ring-tailed lemur
  - Genus Prolemur: the greater bamboo lemur
  - Genus Varecia: ruffed lemurs
  - Genus Hapalemur: bamboo lemurs
    - Lac Alaotra bamboo lemur, H. alaotrensis
    - Golden bamboo lemur, H. aureus
    - Eastern lesser bamboo lemur, H. griseus
      - Gilbert's bamboo lemur, H. g. gilberti
      - Eastern lesser bamboo lemur, H. g. griseus
      - Ranomafana bamboo lemur, H. g. ranomafanensis
    - Southern lesser bamboo lemur, H. meridionalis
    - Western lesser bamboo lemur, H. occidentalis

=== Changes in taxonomy ===
A bamboo lemur, as depicted in Henry Ogg Forbes' 1894 first volume of Handbook to the Primates.

Prior to British-Australian biologist Colin Groves' 2001 revision of lemur taxonomy, three species of bamboo lemur were recognized by most authors: the eastern lesser bamboo lemur, the golden bamboo lemur, and the greater bamboo lemur. Two subspecific taxa of the eastern lesser bamboo lemur, the Lac Alaotra bamboo lemur and the western lesser bamboo lemur, were elevated to specific statuses by Groves. Additionally, Groves removed the greater bamboo lemur from Hapalemur to the monotypic genus Prolemur as Prolemur simus. Following this revision, there was a lack of consensus on which varieties of bamboo lemur were to be classified as species, as different species were supported by different types of evidence. For example, the southern lesser bamboo lemur was recognized on account of cytogenetic evidence, whereas the Lac Alaotra bamboo lemur was recognized by morphology alone. This conflict was expressed by Groves' recognition of four species (excluding the southern lesser bamboo lemur) in the 2005 third edition of Mammal Species of the World, which was challenged by American primatologist Russell Mittermeier and colleagues, who supported a five-species taxonomy in the 2006 second edition of Lemurs of Madagascar.

In 2007, Malagasy zoologist Clément Joseph Rabarivola and colleagues described two subspecies of the eastern lesser bamboo lemur, the Ranomafana bamboo lemur (H. g. ranomafanensis) and Gilbert's bamboo lemur (H. g. gilberti), based on karyotypic evidence. Their description analyzed three different karyotypes expressed by individuals from the Ranomafana National Park, which they would label as H. g. ranomafanensis. They also analyzed an individual living at the Botanical and Zoological Garden of Tsimbazaza, whose karyotype was labeled as H. g. gilberti in wild specimens at the type locality of Beanamalao. They refrained from designating these two taxa as full species because molecular data published by French zoologist Jean-Luc Fausser et al. in 2001 did not indicate that such a distinction would be necessary. The following year, Mittermeier et al. proposed elevating Gilbert's bamboo lemur to specific status, while speculating that the Ranomafana bamboo lemur may have been an expression of chromosomal polymorphism in the eastern lesser bamboo lemur, rather than being a taxon. Rabarivola et al.'s 2007 arrangement was upheld by the time of the publication of the fifth edition of Lemurs of Madagascar in 2023. It is possible that the three H. griseus subspecies may be full species if they are found to be sympatric in Ranomafana National Park.

In 1960, the bamboo lemurs were considered by Danish zoologist Niels Bolwig to occupy a genus with the ring-tailed lemur (Lemur catta) known as Odorlemur, on account of the presence of similar scent glands on the arms and wrists.

== Anatomy and physiology ==
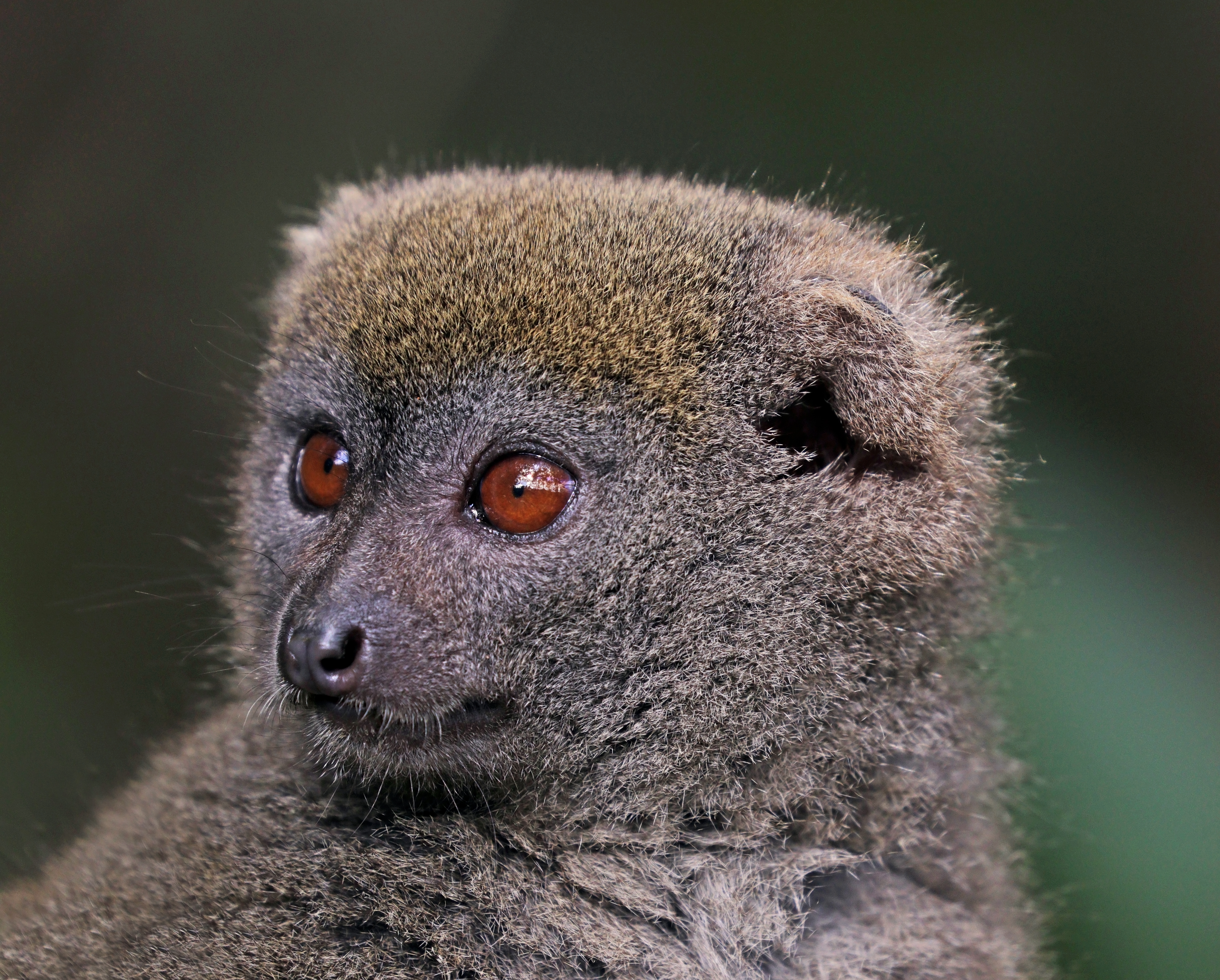
The eastern lesser bamboo lemur (Hapalemur griseus griseus) (top) and the Lac Alaotra bamboo lemur (H. alaotrensis) (bottom)

Bamboo lemurs are lemurids of medium to large size, with tails that are longer than their bodies. By weight, the largest bamboo lemur is the golden bamboo lemur, which weighs between 1.3 and 1.7 kilograms (2.9 and 3.7 lb). It is also one of the longest, being 70–80 centimeters (28–31 in), which is of comparable length to the Lac Alaotra bamboo lemur. The smallest bamboo lemurs by weight are Gilbert's bamboo lemur and the Ranomafana bamboo lemur, which both weigh between 700 and 850 g (25 and 30 oz). The western lesser bamboo lemur is the smallest by total body length, being 55–67 cm (22–26 in) long. Sexual dimorphism is exhibited by some species; female western bamboo lemurs, which have an average weight of 1,188 g (41.9 oz), are significantly heavier than males, which average 846 g (29.8 oz), whereas male Lac Alaotra bamboo lemurs are larger than their female conspecifics.

Bamboo lemurs have round heads with wide faces. The ears are small, and are furred on both sides. Among H. griseus, H. meridionalis, and H. occidentalis, the ears are visible, whereas those of H. aureus and H. alaotrensis are hidden by fur. Hapalemur and Lemur are the only two genera of strepsirrhine that possess a fovea centralis within the eye. As strepsirrhines, bamboo lemurs possess reflective layers on the surfaces of their eyes known tapeta lucida, which enhance sight in low-light settings. The dental formula is 2.1.3.32.1.3.3 × 2 = 36, meaning that there are four incisors, two canines, six premolars, and six molars in either side of the mouth. Like all lemuriforms, bamboo lemurs possess specialized lower incisors (I_{1–2}) and canine (C_{–}) that form a procumbent bed of elongated teeth known as a toothcomb. The lower canine adopts an incisiform shape in the toothcomb, while the anterior lower premolar (P_{2}) is caniniform, and fulfills the function of the lower canine in the mouth. The toothcomb is used for scraping behaviors while processing food items, whereas the cheek teeth are used for cutting. The posterior upper (P^{4}) and posterior lower (P_{4}) premolars are molariform. All of the molars are tricuspid.

The gastrointestinal tracts of bamboo lemurs are able to digest a highly fibrous diet. The cecum has no sacculations and lacks a veriform appendix. The colon is arranged as an array of corkscrew-shaped spirals known as ansa coli.

A 2.54 cm (1.00 in)-long ovoid area of spiny processes is located on either forearm atop a scent gland. At the near end of the spinose area is a callous pad akin to those of the palm, near which carpal whiskers are located. Scent glands are also located on the undersides of the armpits. The digital formula is 4>3>2>5>1, meaning that the fourth digit is the longest and the first digit is the shortest.

The pelage is mostly gray, with the exception of that of the golden bamboo lemur, which is gray-brown with underlying orange hues. In all species, the head is of a lighter color than the rest of the body. The eastern lesser bamboo lemur and Ranomafana bamboo lemur have gray-olive coats. Gilbert's bamboo lemur has a gray-brown coat dorsally, with a gray to red ventrum. The southern lesser bamboo lemur is dark red with a short tail, distinguishing it from other Hapalemur taxa. The western lesser bamboo lemur is uniformly gray-brown with a notably pale face. The Lac Alaotra bamboo lemur is mostly gray-brown, with a chestnut-brown nape and crown.

There are six different somatic numbers (measuring the quantities of chromosomes in somatic cells) expressed by bamboo lemurs, with the Ranomafana bamboo lemur expressing chromosomal polymorphism: 2n = 62 (H. aureus), 2n = 58 (H. occidentalis), 2n= 56 (H. g. ranomafanensis), 2n= 55 (H. g. ranomafanensis), 2n = 54 (H. alaotrensis, H. g. griseus, H. g. ranomafanensis, and H. meridionalis), and 2n= 52 (H. g. gilberti).

== Behavior ==
The bamboo lemurs are typically arboreal dwellers of the low and middle levels of the forest canopy, though the southern bamboo lemur adopts terrestrial habits during the austral winter. Bamboo lemurs locomote by vertical clinging and leaping, which is reflected in their long legs and short arms. They are also able to move quadrupedally across branches while foraging. The Lac Alaotra bamboo lemur occasionally swims. Various activity patterns are expressed by bamboo lemur species: the golden bamboo lemur, eastern lesser bamboo lemur, and southern lesser bamboo lemur are diurnal, meaning that they are only active during the daytime, while the Lac Alaotra bamboo lemur and western lesser bamboo lemur are cathemeral, meaning that they are active at various times throughout the day and night. There are also seasonal fluctuations in activity patterns.

=== Social structure ===
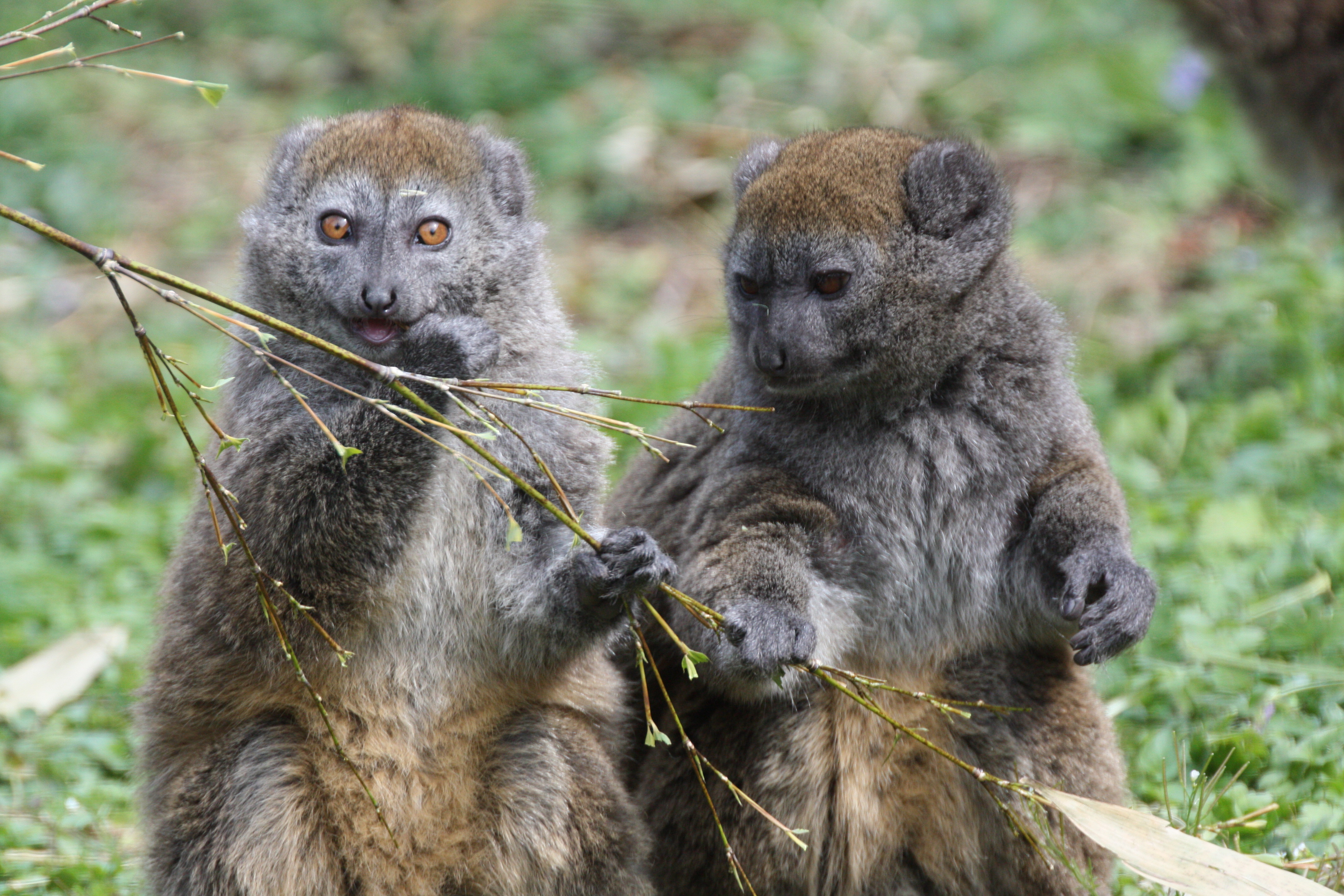
Bamboo lemurs live in social groups.

Although they were once believed by some authors to be socially monogamous, bamboo lemurs are now known to live in flexible social units with variable compositions of adult males and females. The sizes of groups vary between sites, and can be affected by the amount of forest degradation in a location. H. griseus groups can be as large as 11 individuals, while H. aureus groups are typically composed of no more than four individuals. Females have been observed to be dominant over males in the Lac Alaotran bamboo lemur and the eastern lesser bamboo lemur, although this pattern is less clearly exhibited by the golden bamboo lemur.

The repertoire of communicative vocalizations varies between species; among the eastern lesser bamboo lemur, five vocalizations are produced, whereas nine are made by the Lac Alaotra bamboo lemur. Males and females scent mark differently, with males using their brachial glands and females using urine. Direct scent marking of conspecifics is accomplished by placing both wrist glands on the receiving animal at the same time.

=== Reproduction ===
Bamboo lemurs engage in seasonal breeding, whereby successful mating and infant delivery occur during a limited time of the year. This period varies between species and subspecies; the golden bamboo lemur gives birth in November or December, the eastern lesser bamboo lemur gives birth between January and February, and the Ranomafana bamboo lemur gives birth in October or November. The gestation period is 135–145 days. Offspring quantities vary between taxa. The eastern lesser bamboo lemur, Ranomafana bamboo lemur, and western lesser bamboo lemur only give birth to singleton infants, while twins are frequently delivered by the Lac Alaotra bamboo lemur. Twin H. alaotrensis infants tend to wean later and grow slower than singleton conspecifics. As of 2023, only one instance of twinning has been recorded in the golden bamboo lemur.

=== Diet ===
The golden bamboo lemur (Hapalemur aureus) consumes large quantities of cyanide in its diet.

With the exception of the Lac Alaotra bamboo lemur, the bamboo lemurs of the genera Hapalemur and Prolemur are the only primates that are specialist consumers of bamboo. Sympatric bamboo lemur species engage in resource partitioning by specializing in the consumption of different parts of bamboo. For example, the golden bamboo lemur prefers new shoots, while the Ranomafana bamboo lemur consumes leaf bases. The greater bamboo lemur also participates in resource partitioning with Hapalemur species, as it prefers to consume the pith of the culm.

A 1999 survey at the Talatakely research station in Ranomafana National Park found that there was a considerable overlap in the diets of the golden bamboo lemur and the Ranomafana bamboo lemur. Both primarily consumed Madagascar giant bamboo (Cathariostachys madagascariensis), with it comprising 78% and 72% of their diets, respectively. Supplemental food items mainly included other bamboos and grasses of the Poaceae family, including two Cephalostachyum species (C. viguieri and C. perrieri), volofitsiokafo (Nastus elongatus), and vilon'ala (Poecilostachys festucaceus). Non-bamboo foliage and fruit were also opportunistically consumed in small amounts.

The southern lesser bamboo lemur is much more frugivorous than other bamboo lemurs, as can occur in areas without bamboo, such as near Fort-Dauphin. It is also considerably more terrestrial than its congeners, as it often descends to the ground to graze on grasses. During the austral winter, it can spend as much as 70% of its feeding time on the ground. This may be a fallback strategy during times of arboreal food item scarcity, when descending to the ground to eat is worth the added risk of predation from terrestrial and aerial predators in the typically sparsely-canopied areas in which the southern lesser bamboo lemur grazes. Despite this correlation, southern lesser bamboo lemurs still terrestrially graze when arboreal food items are abundant.

The Lac Alaotra bamboo lemur is unique among Hapalemur species in that it specializes in consuming papyrus, reeds, and sedges, rather than bamboo. This is because it is endemic to the wetlands surrounding Lac Alaotra, where bamboo does not occur. It has a narrow dietary breadth, consuming about 11 species in total. A 1999 study found that the most commonly eaten of these species include zozoro (Cyperus madagascariensis), the common reed (Phragmites australis), southern cutgrass (Leersia hexandra), and cockspur grass (Echinochloa crus-galli), with these four species accounting for over 95% of feeding time.

The western lesser bamboo lemur supplements its diet of bamboo with fruit, liana flowers, fungi, and soil. Its preferred bamboo species in primary forest settings is Valiha diffusa, whereas in degraded forests it prefers the non-native fishpole bamboo (Phyllostachys aurea) and male bamboo (Dendrocalamus strictus).

==== Cyanide consumption ====
Both the Ranomafana bamboo lemur and the golden bamboo lemurs consume cyanide from the Madagascar giant bamboo. The golden bamboo lemur's diet is especially rich in cyanide, as it also consumes the growing tips of Cephalostachyum viguieri, which have an average cyanide composition of 15 mg (0.23 gr) per 100 g of foliage. Because the golden bamboo lemur consumes about 500 g (18 oz) of bamboo daily, it is estimated to ingest about 12 times the lethal dose of cyanide in humans every day. It likely consumes even more cyanide than what is indicated by this estimate due to the limitations of chemical analysis used in the 1989 study that produced these data. Cyanide could be processed by these lemurs through unique enzyme pathways, which may be related to the coevolution of Hapalemur and its bamboo food items.

== Distribution ==
Hapalemur occurs in the tropical moist lowland and montane forests of eastern Madagascar, as well as in the tsingy forests of western Madagascar. The southern extent of the genus' range is in the Lavasoa-Ambatotsirongorongo Mountains, while its northernmost occurrence is in the Analamerana Special Reserve. Bamboo lemurs are found in several different habitat types, as well as protected and unprotected areas.

Prior to the taxonomic splitting that divided Hapalemur into its currently recognized number of species and subspecies, the eastern lesser bamboo lemur was considered to comprise the majority of the genus' range. The H. griseus griseus subspecies is now believed to be restricted to patterns of bamboo distribution between Lac Alaotra in the north and Ranomafana National Park in the south. Species living in Ranomafana National Park, including the Ranomafana bamboo lemur and the golden bamboo lemur, live in mixed settings with both bamboo and non-bamboo foliage. H. g. ranomfanensis has two discontinuous populations in the east and west of Madagascar. In the east, it is found between the Mangoro and Onive Rivers in the north and Ranomafana National Park in the south. In its western population, it is found between the Betsiboka River in the north and the Manambolo River in the south. H. g. gilberti is only known in its type locality of the Beanamalao Forest, and Ranomafana National Park, although it is also presumed to occur between the Nosivolo River in the north and the Mangoro and Onive in the south.

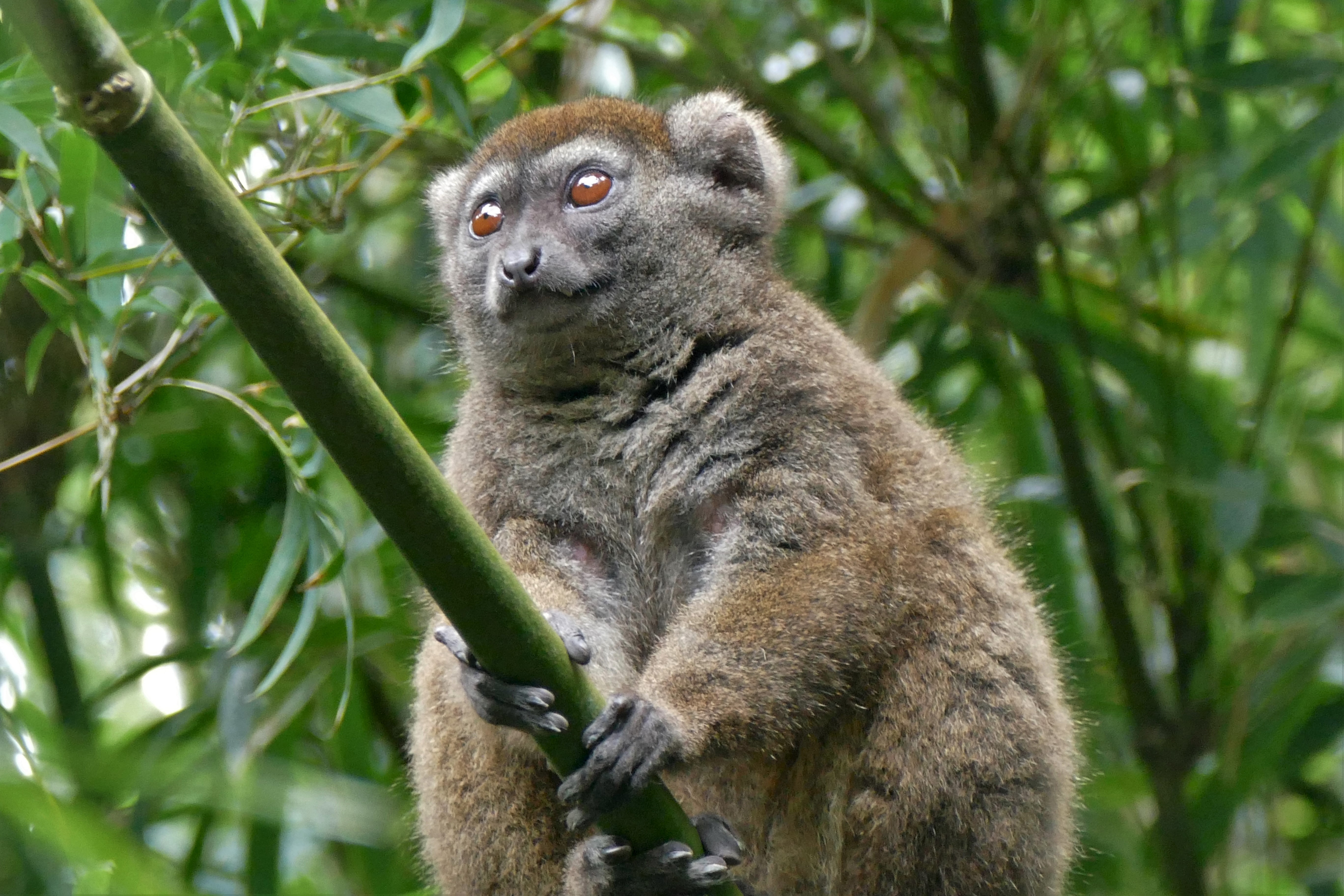
The southern lesser bamboo lemur (Hapalemur meridionalis) can be found in areas without bamboo.

The southern lesser bamboo lemur is found in southeastern Madagascar, independent of the distribution of bamboo. It is the southernmost of the bamboo lemurs, and occurs in areas below 16 km (9.9 mi) in elevation. The type locality of the species is the degraded, littoral lowland rainforest of the Mandena Forestry Station. The species possibly extends as far north as Ranomafana National Park, as an animal that appeared to be a heterozygote between H. meridionalis and H. griseus was found there by Rabarivola et al.

The western lesser bamboo has a discontinuous distribution across northern and northwestern Madagascar. It exists in dry and subhumid deciduous forests in this area. Its range is bounded by the Analamerana Special Reserve in the north and Mananara-Nord National Park in the south. It occurs in many unprotected forests patches throughout the north of the island.

The golden bamboo lemur lives in a heavily restricted range in several sites in southeastern Madagascar. It occurs in tropical moist lowland and montane forests between the elevations of 600 and 1,400 m (2,000 and 4,600 ft). It is found in Ranomafana National Park, Andringitra National Park, the forest corridor that connects Ranomafana with Andringitra, and several unprotected sites to the east of Ranomafana. It also occurs to the north of Ranomafana National Park, as far as the village of Miaranony.

The Lac Alaotra bamboo lemur is restricted to the wetlands surrounding Lac Alaotra in the Alaotra-Mangoro Region of northeastern Madagascar. Its range amounts to less than 519 km^{2} (200 sq mi). There are two subpopulations, one being located on the northern shore of the lake and the other being found on the southwestern shore, with the Belampona Peninsula separating them. There was previously a third population located about 60 km (37 mi) north of Lac Alaotra in the Andilamena District, however it was extirpated from the area as a result of the creation of hydroelectric dams in the 1950s. H. alaotrensis is the only primate species that exclusively occurs in marshes.

== Predation ==
Known predators of bamboo lemurs include the Malagasy tree boa (Sanzinia madagascariensis), Henst's goshawk (Astur henstii), and the Madagascar harrier-hawk (Polyboroides radiatus). Bamboo lemurs rely on crypsis as their primary anti-predator adaptation.

== Conservation status ==
The western lesser bamboo lemur (Hapalemur occidentalis) is one of three bamboo lemur species with captive populations.

The golden bamboo lemur and Lac Alaotra bamboo lemurs are classified as critically endangered species by the IUCN Red List. The remaining species and subspecies are classified as vulnerable, with the exception of Gilbert's bamboo lemur, which is classified as a data deficient, as it has not been studied in the wild. Wild populations are declining due to habitat destruction and poaching. Causes of habitat loss for the southern lesser bamboo lemur include agricultural expansion via bush fires, and illicit logging, charcoal production, and mining. The same bamboo that many bamboo lemur species use as both a habitat and as a food source is also used by humans as a construction material and for making baskets. Bamboo lemur habitats can be cleared for growing cannabis or, in the case of the Lac Alaotra bamboo lemur, for converting wetlands into rice paddies. Additionally, many bamboo lemur species are hunted for their meat. Cortni Borgerson et al. found that an average of 0.18 western lesser bamboo lemurs were eaten annually per surveyed household. The southern lesser bamboo lemur is sometimes hunted to deter crop raiding by the lemurs. Bamboo lemurs can also be hunted to express contempt for the government. Traditional taboos in Malagasy culture known as fady sometimes proscribe the hunting or consumption of bamboo lemurs, however the effectiveness of these bans has diminished in recent years.

Only the Lac Alaotra bamboo lemur, the western lesser bamboo lemur, and the eastern lesser bamboo lemur are known to be kept in captivity. The Jersey Zoo operates a captive breeding program for the Lac Alaotra bamboo lemur. As of 2022, only one eastern lesser bamboo lemur remains in institutions registered in Species360's Zoological Information Management System. In addition to known captive populations, many species are illegally kept as exotic pets.
