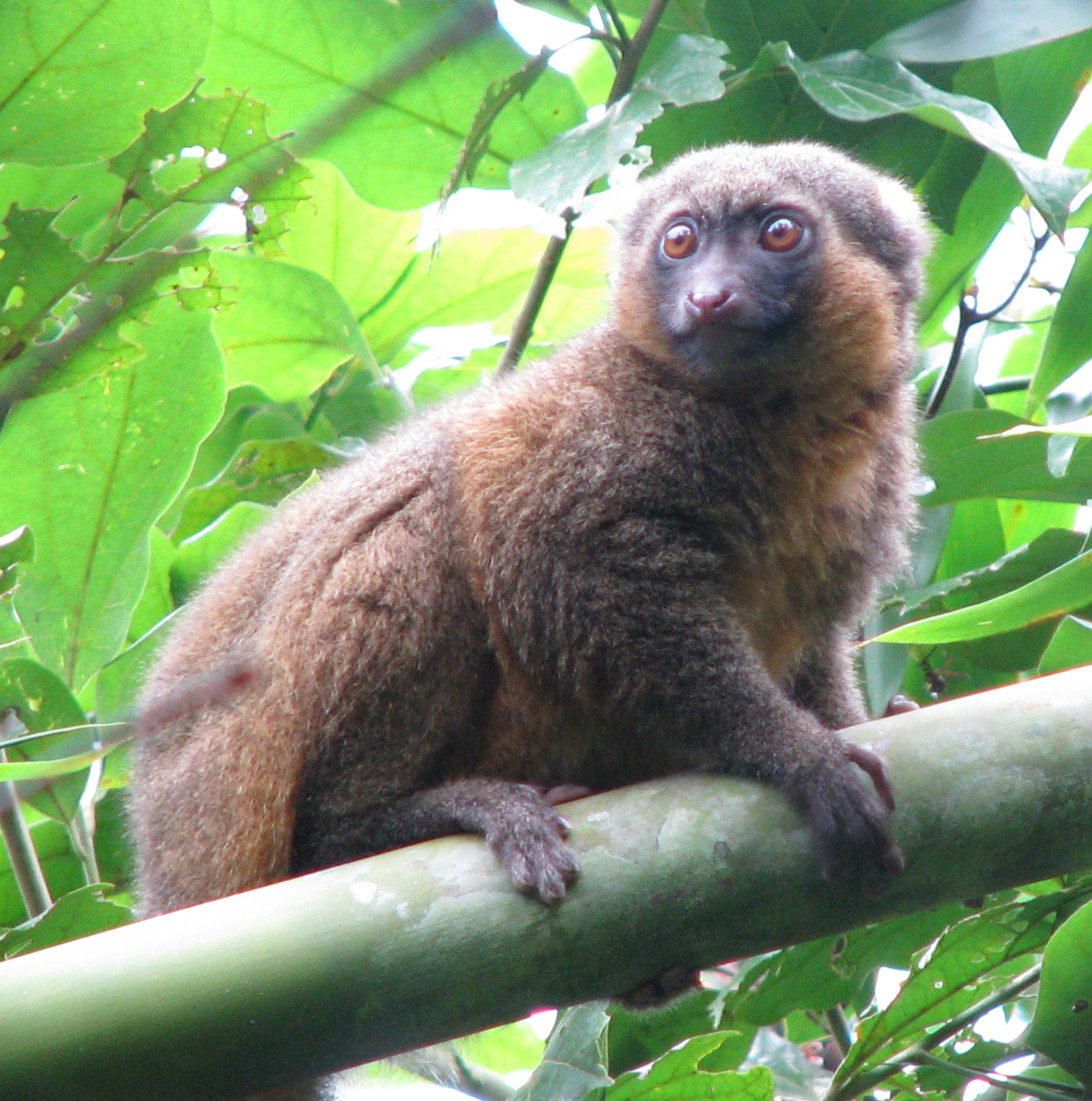
- In Ranomafana National Park

Conservation status
- Critically Endangered (IUCN 3.1)
- CITES Appendix I

Scientific classification
- Kingdom: Animalia
- Phylum: Chordata
- Class: Mammalia
- Order: Primates
- Suborder: Strepsirrhini
- Family: Lemuridae
- Genus: Hapalemur
- Species: H. aureus

Binomial name
- Hapalemur aureus Meier et al., 1987
- Distribution of H. aureus

= Golden bamboo lemur =

Species of lemur

The golden bamboo lemur (Hapalemur aureus) is a medium-sized bamboo lemur endemic to south-eastern Madagascar. As the largest member of Hapalemur and the second largest bamboo lemur, H. aureus females have average head-body lengths 395 millimeters (15.6 in) with 410 mm (16 in) tails, while males average 34 cm (13 in) with 37 cm (15 in) tails. Body weights range between 1 and 2.5 kg (2.2 and 5.5 lb), with females averaging 1.5 kg (3.3 lb) and males typically weighing 1.66 kilograms (3.7 lb). The golden bamboo lemur is identifiable by its pelage; the face is wreathed by golden fur, with the body being pale orange on the back and golden on the front. The tail is long and bush, darkening towards the tip. A brachial gland is present on the forelimbs, which secretes a pungent exudate.

The golden bamboo lemur maintains a folivorous diet consisting primarily of Madagascar giant bamboo (Cathariostachys madagascariensis). Adults consume about 500 g (18 oz) of cyanide each day, which is about 12 times the lethal dose of the substance in most animals of comparable body sizes. Its ability to consume plants with high levels of cyanide that are not desired by other, sympatric bamboo lemurs allows it to practice resource partitioning with congeners. It lives in small social groups that typically consist of 3–4 individuals that maintain home ranges of up to 30 hectares (74 acres) in size, although this varies between locations. It has a sparse distribution with low population densities, and is arboreal.

The golden bamboo lemur is classified as a critically endangered species by the IUCN Red List, and is listed under CITES Appendix I. Habitat loss poses an existential threat to the species, as it relies on bamboo forests that are deforested for use in construction, basket-making, and for slash and burn agriculture. Individuals are sometimes killed in snare traps set by poachers. Conservation efforts are underway, with bamboo groves being replanted in some parts of the species' range.

== Etymology ==
The golden bamboo lemur is known as bokombolomena and varibolomena in Malagasy. In French it is called the hapalémur doré. Its discovery and description contributed to the decline of the term "gentle lemur" in favor of "bamboo lemur."

== Taxonomic classification ==
The golden bamboo lemur was discovered in 1985 by Corinne Dague. It was formally described in 1987 by Bernhard Meier and colleagues based on a holotype collected from what is now Ranomafana National Park. The holotype, a male, was captured alongside a female paratype, and was elevated to holotypic status after his death in captivity.

== Description ==
The golden bamboo lemur is the largest member of Hapalemur and the second largest bamboo lemur. Female golden bamboo lemurs are larger than males; female head-body lengths average 395 mm (15.6 in) with 410 mm (16 in) tails, whereas males' head-body lengths average 34 cm (13 in) with 37 cm (15 in) tails. The golden bamboo lemur weighs between 1 and 2.5 kg (2.2 and 5.5 lb). Males, averaging 1.66 kilograms (3.7 lb), are slightly heavier than females, which average 1.5 kg (3.3 lb).

The golden bamboo lemur possesses a short, broad face that is characteristic of all bamboo lemurs. Unlike other lemurids, the face is shorter than the braincase. The ears are small and round, with hair on both aspects. The dental formula is 2.1.3.32.1.3.3 × 2 = 36, which means that there are four incisors, two canines, six premolars, and six molars on either side of the mouth. The angulus mandibulae is large, extending caudally, medially, and dorsally. The inner upper incisors (I^{1}) are separated from each other by a diastema. The upper canine (C^{–}) is tusk-like, and is separated from the anterior upper premolar (P^{2}) by a diastema, into which the caniniform anterior lower premolar (P_{2}) fits. The lower canine (C_{–}) is incisiform, and is larger than the lower incisors (I_{1–2}). The mystacial whiskers are prominent on the face, and carpal vibrassae are present on the limbs. The golden bamboo lemur has two pairs of mammae, one of which is located on the shoulders. The digital formula is 4>3>2>5>1, meaning that the fourth digit is the longest and the first digit is the shortest. The apical digital pads are bulbous.

Facial and ventral pelage

The pelage is soft, dense, and flocky. The face of the golden bamboo lemur is framed by golden fur. It is similarly golden ventrally, whereas the back is pale orange with gray guard hairs. The nose is pink, while the rest of the face is dark. Golden-brown hairs adorn the ears, but do not form tufts. Females are identifiable by being slightly grayer than males on the dorsum. A brachial gland is found on the medial aspect of the upper forelimb, which makes contact with a hairless, dark, hard, knobby surface on the lower forelimb during flexion of the elbow joint. The glandular secretions of the upper forelimb are white, viscous, and pungent. The tail is bushy, and is darker at the tip than the base.

The somatic number of the golden bamboo lemur is 2n = 62, wherein all chromosomes are acrocentric.

== Behavior ==
The golden bamboo lemur is crepuscular, and occasionally nocturnal. While engaging in daytime activities, it takes a midday rest. It is arboreal, lives in small social groups of 3–4 individuals, and maintains home ranges of up to 30 ha (74 acres). It usually travels less than 400 m (1,300 ft) per day. Some locations have more variable group sizes, such as the Talatakely research site in Ranomafana National Park, where groups range between 3 and 8 individuals. The contact call used between individuals is a hard grunt. At night, a conspicuous great call is uttered.

=== Reproduction ===
Mating occurs in July. The gestation period is approximately 138 days. Females usually give birth to a singleton infant at the beginning of the rainy season in November or December. Only one twin birth has been documented. Immature individuals are born in an altricial state and are kept hidden in dense vegetation for the first two weeks of life. Weaning occurs at six months of age. A female was reported to disperse from her natal group at three years of age. One infant is born per year.

=== Diet ===
Golden bamboo lemurs consume shoots, leaf bases, and creepers.

The golden bamboo lemur primarily consumes the Madagascar giant bamboo (Cathariostachys madagascariensis) by feeding on new shoots, leaf bases, and creepers. It also spends a small amount of time consuming other grass and bamboo species. It prefers protein-rich growing tips that may be overlooked by sympatric bamboo lemurs. These growing shoots contain 0.015% (1 part in 6667) of cyanide. Each adult lemur eats about 500 g (18 oz) of bamboo per day, which contain about twelve times the lethal dose of cyanide for most other animals of this size. It is currently unknown how the lemur avoids cyanide poisoning, but this may allow it to practice resource partitioning with other species of Hapalemur, who would not compete with the golden bamboo lemur for toxic and undesirable plant parts.

Its diet is supplemented by the leaves, stems, flowers, and fruit of non-bamboo plants, as well as mushrooms.

== Distribution ==
H. aureus has a sparse distribution.

The species is endemic to the tropical moist lowland and montane rainforests of southeastern Madagascar, and occurs at elevations of 600–1,400 m (2,000–4,600 ft). It is found in the vicinity of Ranomafana National Park, Andringitra National Park, and the Fandriana-Vondrozo Corridor that connects the two national parks. The northern boundary of its range is the village of Miaranony. The population density is typically low, and was estimated to be o.21 lemurs/km^{2} in Ranomafana National Park. Most of the species' population exists within Ranomafana.

The golden bamboo lemur is sympatric with the Ranomafana bamboo lemur (Hapalemur griseus ranomafanensis) and the Gilbert's bamboo lemur (H. g. gilberti) subspecies of eastern lesser bamboo lemur in Ranomafana National Park. It is also sympatric with the Ranomafana bamboo lemur in Andringitra National Park. In both national parks, it is sympatric with the southern lesser bamboo lemur (H. meridionalis) and the greater bamboo lemur (Prolemur simus).

== Conservation ==
The golden bamboo lemur is classified as critically endangered by the International Union for Conservation of Nature, and is listed on CITES Appendix I. The wild population is estimated to be 600–1,000 individuals. The species suffers from habitat loss due to the harvesting of bamboo for construction and basket-making, as well as slash and burn agriculture. Snare traps also pose a threat in some areas.

Long-term monitoring of the Talatakely research station in Ranomafana National Park indicates that the population may be recovering in that area. There are ongoing efforts to reestablish bamboo groves in the Fandriana-Vondrozo Corridor. As of 2022, no golden bamboo lemurs are known to exist in captivity. There was previously a small captive population at the Botanical and Zoological Garden of Tsimbazaza, however no breeding program was administered there.
