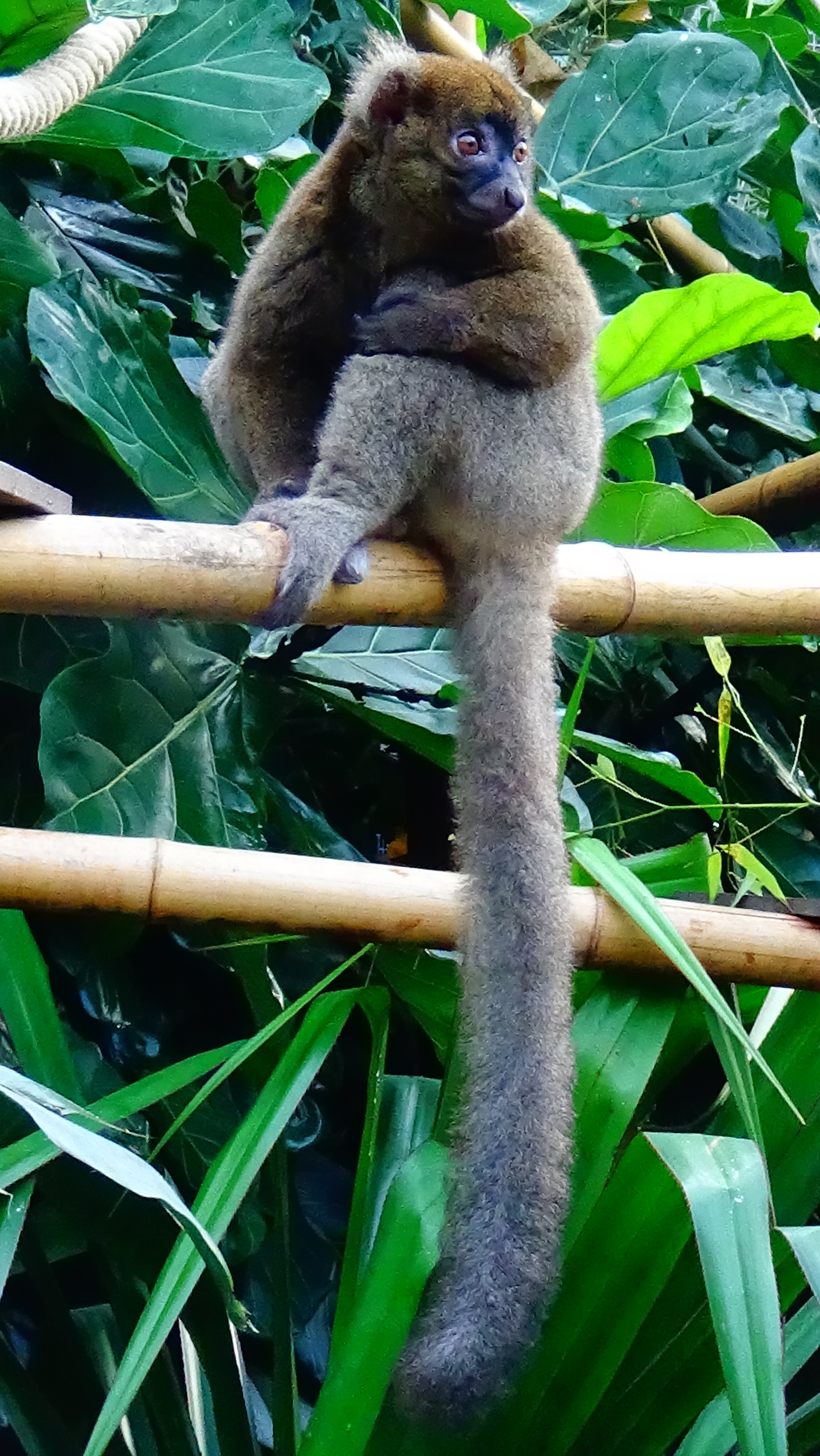
- In Paris Zoological Park

Conservation status
- Critically Endangered (IUCN 3.1)
- CITES Appendix I

Scientific classification
- Kingdom: Animalia
- Phylum: Chordata
- Class: Mammalia
- Order: Primates
- Suborder: Strepsirrhini
- Family: Lemuridae
- Genus: Prolemur
- Species: P. simus

Binomial name
- Prolemur simus J. E. Gray, 1871
- Distribution of H. simus

Synonyms
- Genus: Prohapalemur Lamberton, 1936; Species: Hapalemur gallieni Standing, 1905

= Greater bamboo lemur =

Species of lemur

The greater bamboo lemur (Prolemur simus), also known as the broad-nosed bamboo lemur and the broad-nosed gentle lemur, is a species of lemur endemic to bamboo forests in eastern Madagascar. As the largest of the bamboo lemurs, the greater bamboo lemur can have a head-body length between 40 and 42 centimeters (16 and 17 in) and a tail length of 45–48 cm (18–19 in), with body weights averaging 2.75 kg (6.1 lb) in males and 2.61 kg (5.8 lb) in females. It is distinguishable from other bamboo lemurs by its truncated muzzle, white-tufted ears, neck gland in males, and gray-brown pelage, of which two color morphs are exhibited. It is the only member of the monotypic genus Prolemur.

The greater bamboo lemur is a bamboo specialist; woody bamboos comprise up to 95% of an individual's diet, though it is also known to consume fruits, flowers, and other grasses. Because of its reliance on bamboo, its diet contains high levels of cyanide. It is a cathemeral species, as it can be active during the day and at night. It lives in gregarious social groups of up to 28 individuals that share home ranges of at least 60 hectares (150 acres), which typically expand during the austral summer. The greater bamboo lemur is the only lemur species with a male-dominated social hierarchy.

Although it was once one of the most widespread and populous lemur species in Madagascar, the greater bamboo lemur is now classified as critically endangered by the IUCN Red List and is listed under Appendix I by CITES. Prior to its rediscovery in 1964 by André Peyriéras, the greater bamboo lemur's population dwindled in the late 19th century such that it was believed by many authors to have gone extinct. Today, it is known to exist across a small number of genetically isolated subpopulations located throughout eastern Madagascar, with 1,000 wild individuals having been identified by 2015. Anthropogenic threats to the survival of the species include poaching and habitat loss due to slash and burn agriculture, mining, climate change, and illegal logging.

== Etymology ==
The greater bamboo lemur is alternatively known as the broad-nosed bamboo lemur or the broad-nosed gentle lemur. The term "gentle lemur" is derived from an English translation of the species' former genus, Hapalemur, which is itself derived from the Greek word ἁπαλός (hapalos), meaning "gentle." Hapalemur was coined by French zoologist Isidore Geoffroy Saint-Hilaire in 1851 because bamboo lemurs reminded him of marmosets, which were then known by the generic name Hapale. The term "bamboo lemur" gradually eclipsed "gentle lemur" following the 1987 discovery of the golden bamboo lemur (Hapalemur aureus) and the usage of the former term in the 1994 first edition of Lemurs of Madagascar. The common name "greater bamboo lemur" took precedence over "broad-nosed lemur" variants following a 1988 discovery of new populations. The current generic name for the species, Prolemur, was coined by British zoologist John Edward Gray in 1871, though he did not explain his reasoning for choosing that name.

In Ranomafana National Park, the greater bamboo lemur is known as varibolo and varibolomavo, "vàri" meaning "lemur" and "volo" meaning "bamboo." Other Malagasy names for the species include godroka and godrogodroka in the Torotorofotsy Harmonious Protected Landscape, tan-tang in the Bay of Antongil area, bokombolobe, reniben' ny kotrika, and halogodro in the Soanierana Ivongo District, and varikovoka in the Ambolomavo region. In French, the greater bamboo lemur is called the grand hapalémur or the hapalémur simien.

== Taxonomy ==
The greater bamboo lemur was originally described as Hapalemur (Prolemur) simus by John Edward Gray in 1871. The type specimen lived in the London Zoo, and was acquired by the British Museum after its death. With the understanding that this species is more closely related to the ring-tailed lemur (Lemur catta) than to the other Hapalemur species, British-Australian biologist Colin Groves resurrected Prolemur as a monotypic genus in 2001, with this species as its only member. This taxonomy has not been universally accepted, and was challenged by James P. Herrera and Colombian biologist Liliana M. Dávalos in 2016 based on morphological and genetic evidence. Despite this, Groves' Prolemur was upheld by Mittermeier et al. in the 2023 fifth edition of Lemurs of Madagascar.

The synonym Hapalemur gallieni was described by English paleontologist Herbert F. Standing in 1905, based on subfossil remains of greater bamboo lemurs. French paleontologist Charles Lamberton later described the same subfossil specimens as belonging to a monotypic genus named Prohapalemur gallieni in 1936. Prohapalemur was generally omitted by subsequent authors, though gallieni was accepted to have been a widely distributed extinct subfossil relative of the greater bamboo lemur. Primatologist Joël Mahé revised this arrangement in 1976, concluding that the Prohapalemur gallieni specimen was a subspecies of the extant Hapalemur [recte Prolemur] simus, which he named H. s. robustus. This was challenged in 1985 by Martine Vuillaume-Randriamanantena and colleagues, who asserted that Standing and Lamberton's descriptions resulted from them having not compared their subfossil evidence to extant greater bamboo lemurs, which would have been identical.

== Description ==
The greater bamboo lemur is the largest of the bamboo lemurs, having a head-body length of 40–42 cm (16–17 in) and a tail length of 45–48 cm (18–19 in), amounting to a total length of 85–90 cm (33–35 in). Males, weighing between 2.15 and 3.55 kg (4.7 and 7.8 lb) with an average weight of 2.75 kg (6.1 lb), are slightly heavier than females, who weigh between 2.2 and 3.25 kg (4.9 and 7.2 lb) with an average weight of 2.61 kg (5.8 lb). The intermembral index is 65, with the arms being shorter and thinner than the legs. The somatic number of the greater bamboo lemur is 2n = 60, wherein 4 autosomal chromosomes and the X chromosome are metacentric (the centromere is positioned halfway between the chromosomal ends), and 54 autosomal chromosomes and the Y chromosome are acrocentric (the centromere is closer to one pair of chromosomal ends than the other).

The muzzle is shortened, which is a trait that is associated with an increase in bite force, possibly to aid in the chewing of difficult-to-process food items such as bamboo. The ears are small and rounded. The dental formula is 2.1.3.32.1.3.3 × 2 = 36, which means that there are four incisors, two canines, six premolars, and six molars in either side of the mouth. The upper incisors (I^{1–2}) are small in size and are clustered closely to the upper canine (C^{–}), with the outer upper incisor (I^{2}) being considerably reduced compared to the inner upper incisor (I^{1}). This reduction in size is due to a lack of contact with the lower incisors (I_{1–2}), which are occupied by the toothcomb. The two lower incisors and the lower canine (C_{–}) are flattened laterally and procumbent in orientation, comprising the toothcomb. The lower canine is incisiform in shape. The upper canine is separated from the frontal upper premolar (P^{2}) by a gap. The rear upper premolar (P^{4}) is fully molarized, closely resembling the frontal upper molar (M^{1}), while the middle upper premolar (P^{3}) is partially molarized. The rear lower premolar (P_{4}) is similarly molariform. The frontal lower premolar (P_{2}) is caniniform, as it plays the role of the canine in the mandibular teeth, which is occupied by the toothcomb. The upper molars possess hypocones, with M^{1} having a protostyle. The greater bamboo lemur is the only lemurid lacking a hypoconulid cusp in the rear lower molar (M_{3}). The premolars and molars are serrated, which allows for efficient biting and chewing of bamboo stems. The mandible is gracile, constricting anteriorly. The digital formula is 4>3>2>5>1, meaning that the fourth digit is the longest and the first digit is the shortest. The outer digital pads are bulbous.

Standard color morph

A greater bamboo lemur's sense of smell is facilitated by a well-developed vomeronasal organ in the nasal septum. Exploratory smelling behaviors are aided by a sensitive moist rhinarium on the tip of the snout, which is receptive to touch. Scent glands adorn the inner surfaces of the upper arms, which is an atypical location among primates. In males, patches of spiny hairs are located near the wrists of the forelimbs. Two pairs of mammae are present in females. With the exception of the two species of ruffed lemurs (Varecia), the greater bamboo lemur is the only lemurid to possess a scent gland on the neck among males. The spleen is Y-shaped, which is an abnormal configuration for a strepsirrhine. The large intestine is arranged in corkscrew-shaped spirals known as ansa coli.

Among individuals belonging to the standard morph of the species, the fur is generally gray-brown with a rufous tinge on the back and on the tail, while it is creamy-brown on the front. The crown of the head and the shoulders are washed with an olive-brown hue. A rusty pygal patch is present above the base of the tail. The tail darkens near the tip. Prominent white tufts adorn the ears. The neck, sides of the head, and the region around the eyes are pale, while the region between the eyes is dark. The iris is dirty gray.

A variant color morph is expressed among a population of greater bamboo lemurs endemic to the Andringitra Massif. This morph is uniformly golden-red across the body, with the exception of a black face and muzzle and a gray-tipped tail. The white ear tufts exhibited by other greater bamboo lemurs are absent, and these individuals tend to be of a larger body size.

The oldest known greater bamboo lemur died in captivity at 24 years of age. The longevities of wild individuals have not been documented.

== Behavior ==
Greater bamboo lemurs live in gregarious groups of up to 28 individuals, with the mean group size being eight individuals. Groups can be either multimale-multifemale or one male-multifemale. It is possible that the sizes of groups fluctuate throughout the year and across different locations. These groups live in home ranges of at least 60 hectares (150 acres), which tend to grow in size during the austral summer. The greater bamboo lemur is the only known male-dominated lemur species; males have been observed to take bamboo pith from females.

The greater bamboo lemur changes its locomotive preference throughout the year, being more terrestrial during the austral summer and more arboreal during the austral winter. While arboreal, it travels via vertical clinging and leaping. This locomotor method is an adaptation to the abundance of vertical substrates (surfaces upon which an animal can travel) and dearth of horizontal substrates in the species' preferred habitat of bamboo thickets. Despite this pattern of behavior, the greater bamboo lemur is not morphologically dependent on vertical clinging and leaping, as is the case with some other vertical clinger and leaper species.

25–30% of a greater bamboo lemur's time is spent consuming food on the ground. It is cathemeral, meaning that it can be active during both the daytime and the nighttime, although it exhibits a preference for nighttime activity. Unlike other bamboo lemurs, the greater bamboo lemur does not park its infants while foraging, as it instead carries its offspring on its back or in its mouth.

=== Reproduction ===
Mother foraging with infant

The greater bamboo lemur mates polygynously, by which a single male copulates with multiple females. Mating occurs in May or June, and the gestation period is 148–150 days. Beginning at 2 or 3 years of age, females typically give birth to singleton infants annually, with twinning being a rare occurrence. Females briefly leave their social groups to give birth in solitude. The rate of infant mortality is high, with 40–50% of infants dying in their first year of life. Mothers transport their immature offspring in their mouths and on their backs; most infant deaths occur from falling off the mother's back during transportation. Infants typically become independent of their mothers at 5 months, although they are not fully weaned until 7–10 months of age. After weaning, immature greater bamboo lemurs rely on adults to process bamboo stalks for them until they are able to do so themselves. Males disperse from their natal ranges at 3 or 4 years of age.

=== Communication ===
The greater bamboo lemur produces nine distinct vocalizations. The loud call is a whistle, which is uttered while mobbing predators. Just before dusk, social groups of greater bamboo lemurs produce a chorus of "advertisement calls" that convey information about their whereabouts to other groups. Like most lemurs, the greater bamboo lemur creates a non-specific low-level group alert vocalization known as a "gulp" or a "hoot." Low-amplitude close-contact calls are emitted during group travel. Clicks and grunts are produced in response to terrestrial disturbances, which can be combined into click or grunt series if the disturbance is particularly alarming. Another response to disturbances is the short growl, also known as "pulsed bleats," which is exchanged between group members. American primatologist Patricia Wright described one of the vocalizations of the greater bamboo lemur as a "raucous, crow-like call." Olfaction and facial expressions are also used to communicate; pulled-back ears indicate aggression or fear. Tail-swinging is another form of visual communication that is used by the greater bamboo lemur and many other lemurid species. Its function may be to signal one's location to conspecifics when faced with terrestrial stimuli, or to visually confuse predators.

=== Diet ===
Processing bamboo

P. simus is a specialist species that primarily subsists on bamboo. Madagascar giant bamboo (Cathariostachys madagascariensis) tends to be consumed in mid- and high-altitude rainforests, while Valiha diffusa and common bamboo (Bambusa vulgaris) are consumed in lower-altitude secondary habitats. The shoots, pith, culm, and both young and mature leaves of these species are eaten. Culm is consumed in greater quantities between August and November, whereas shoots are favored during the onset of the rainy season. Woody bamboos account for 72–95% of the greater bamboo lemur's diet, which accumulates high levels of cyanide. The daily amount of cyanide consumed by the greater bamboo lemur is about 48 times the lethal dose of the chemical in mammals of comparable size. The detoxification of harmful chemicals in bamboo may be a result of the low amount of tannins in its diet. Most of the cyanide is eliminated through urination. The average transit time is 8.4 hours, which is much shorter than in sympatric Hapalemur species that also feed on bamboo. This rapid passage of food through the digestive tract allows for high volumes of food items to be consumed to account for the poor nutritional qualities of the greater bamboo lemur's preferred diet of pith.

Other food items that are consumed include longoza (Aframomum angustifolium), Molucca bramble (Rubus moluccanus), Kikuyu grass (Cenchrus clandestinus), figs (Ficus spp.), the fruit of Dypsis palms, the flowers of traveler's tree (Ravenala madagascariensis), pineapple (Ananas comosus), soil, and fungi. The greater bamboo lemur also consumes agricultural crops, including lychee (Litchi chinensis), custard apples (Annona squamosa), jackfruit (Artocarpus heterophyllus), breadfruit (Artocarpus altilis), bananas (Musa sp.), sugarcanes (Saccharum sp.), and coffee (Coffea sp.).

== Ecology ==
The small portion of fruit in a greater bamboo lemur's diet qualifies it as a seed disperser. It plays an important ecological role in its habitat by thinning bamboo groves, as it breaks apart stalks while it processes its food items. It is known to share its territory with sympatric lemur species such as the red-fronted lemur (Eulemur rufifrons) and the black-and-white ruffed lemur (Varecia variegata). It coexists with other bamboo lemur species, such as the eastern lesser bamboo lemur (Hapalemur griseus) and the golden bamboo lemur, by specializing in consuming parts of the Madagascar giant bamboo that are not sought after by sympatric bamboo lemurs species, thereby engaging in resource partitioning.

== Distribution ==
The greater bamboo lemur's distribution corresponds with the distribution of its food.

Greater bamboo lemurs occur at elevations between 20 and 1,600 meters (66 and 5,249 ft) above sea level across 13 isolated subpopulations in eastern Madagascar, although its range might extend beyond these identified groups. The latitudinal extents of the greater bamboo lemur's range are 14°47' S in the north and 22°26' S in the south. In 2007, only five subpopulations were known, those being in Ranomafana National Park, a coffee plantation in the municipality of Kianjavato, Andringitra National Park, Torotorofotsy Harmonious Protected Landscape, and the Karianga-Ivato region. Subsequent surveys identified eight more subpopulations: that of the Andriantantely forest, that of the Ankeniheny-Zahamena Corridor, Zahamena National Park, the municipalities of Mahalina and Vohiposa, the regions of Nosivolo-Marolambo and Midongy-Vondrozo, and an eastern subpopulation in Ranomafana National Park. In 2022, three greater bamboo lemurs were observed in Makira Natural Park, and are believed to be representatives of an extremely small subpopulation endemic to that area. It primarily occurs outside of protected areas.

The distribution of the greater bamboo lemur is tied to that of its food items. In Ranomafana National Park, the greater bamboo lemur is associated with the distribution of Madagascar giant bamboo. Outside of Ranomafana, the greater bamboo lemur is also found at sites where Madagascar giant bamboo is absent, instead associating with V. diffusa and the Cephalostachyum species Cephalostachyum perrieri. The availability of drinking water may also be a significant determinant of greater bamboo lemur distribution, especially during the dry season. The greater bamboo lemur shows a preference for habitats with high densities of thick bamboo and a diversity of tree heights. The population density in Kianjavato was found to be 6.84 lemurs/km^{2}.

== Conservation status ==
The greater bamboo lemur was once one of the most abundant lemur species. It is now one of the rarest.

The greater bamboo lemur is classified as a critically endangered species by the International Union for the Conservation of Nature's Red List, and is scheduled under CITES Appendix I. There was an estimated 80% decline in the species' population over a 30-year period. Threats to the species' survival include slash-and-burn agriculture, mining, illegal logging, bamboo cutting, genetic isolation, and poaching. An estimated 17% of the species' population was lost to poaching in a single year. This illicit hunting likely exacerbates other threats faced by the species. Climate change is another threat to the greater bamboo lemur, as lengthening of dry seasons reduces the availability of both preferred bamboo food items and drinking water. Unsustainable ecotourism may also harm the species, as high volumes of tourists can damage bamboo forests. The greater bamboo lemur's highly specialized diet makes it especially vulnerable to the loss of its narrow selection of usable food items. It is known to be illegally kept as an exotic pet in Madagascar.

The greater bamboo lemur's modern range is about 1–4% of the size of its previous distribution, which spanned northern, central, and eastern Madagascar. It was one of the most abundant lemurs in prehistoric Madagascar, attaining an estimated population maximum of one million individuals between 60,000 and 90,000 years ago, which fell to an estimated effective population of 109,000 individuals 20,000 years ago. The most dramatic population reduction occurred during the Pleistocene, likely due to climatic changes. Its current distribution is restricted to eastern Madagascar, although fossils indicate its former range spanned a larger area of the island, extending as far north as Ankarana. By the late 1800s AD, the species had dwindled in population such that specimens from that era rarely occur in collections, though were still widespread in distribution nonetheless. Specimen sites from this period were located throughout the eastern rainforest of Madagascar, from Mananara Avaratra in the north to Farafangana in the south. This population reduction was likely anthropogenic. Between the earlier Pleistocene population crash and the subsequent anthropogenic crash, the population of the greater bamboo lemur has fallen from its prehistoric zenith by 99.9%.

No live specimens were recorded in the 20th century until 1964, when French zoologist André Peyriéras rediscovered the species in a market in Vondrozo. Prior to this, some authors speculated that the species had gone extinct. Alongside French primatologist Jean-Jacques Petter and ecologist Roland Albignac, Peyriéras later discovered the Kianjavato subpopulation in 1972. In 2015, the known wild population of the greater bamboo lemur consisted of approximately 1,000 individuals, higher than the fewer than 100 known individuals in 2007. It was formerly listed as a member of "the World's 25 Most Endangered Primates"; however, the species is now believed to be less imperiled than it was previously assumed to be. This new understanding of the species' demography was partially brought about by the Aspinall Foundation's 2008 "Saving Prolemur simus" project, which facilitated population surveys and oversaw community conservation initiatives. Despite the accomplishments of previous conservation efforts, unchecked forest degradation and an increase in mining concessions provided by governmental authorities may threaten subpopulations outside of protected areas in the future. However, a limited amount of anthropogenic forest disturbance can also have a beneficial impact on P. simus populations. Moderate amounts of habitat disturbance create gaps in the tree canopy that can be opportunistically exploited by Madagascar giant bamboo shoots, thereby increasing the food supply and the amount of usable vertical substrates for the greater bamboo lemur. Nevertheless, the greater bamboo lemur prefers habitats without high levels of human disturbance.

As of October 2024, at least 36 individuals are known to exist in captivity. Almost all captive greater bamboo lemurs are descended from a mated pair of two wild-born individuals.
