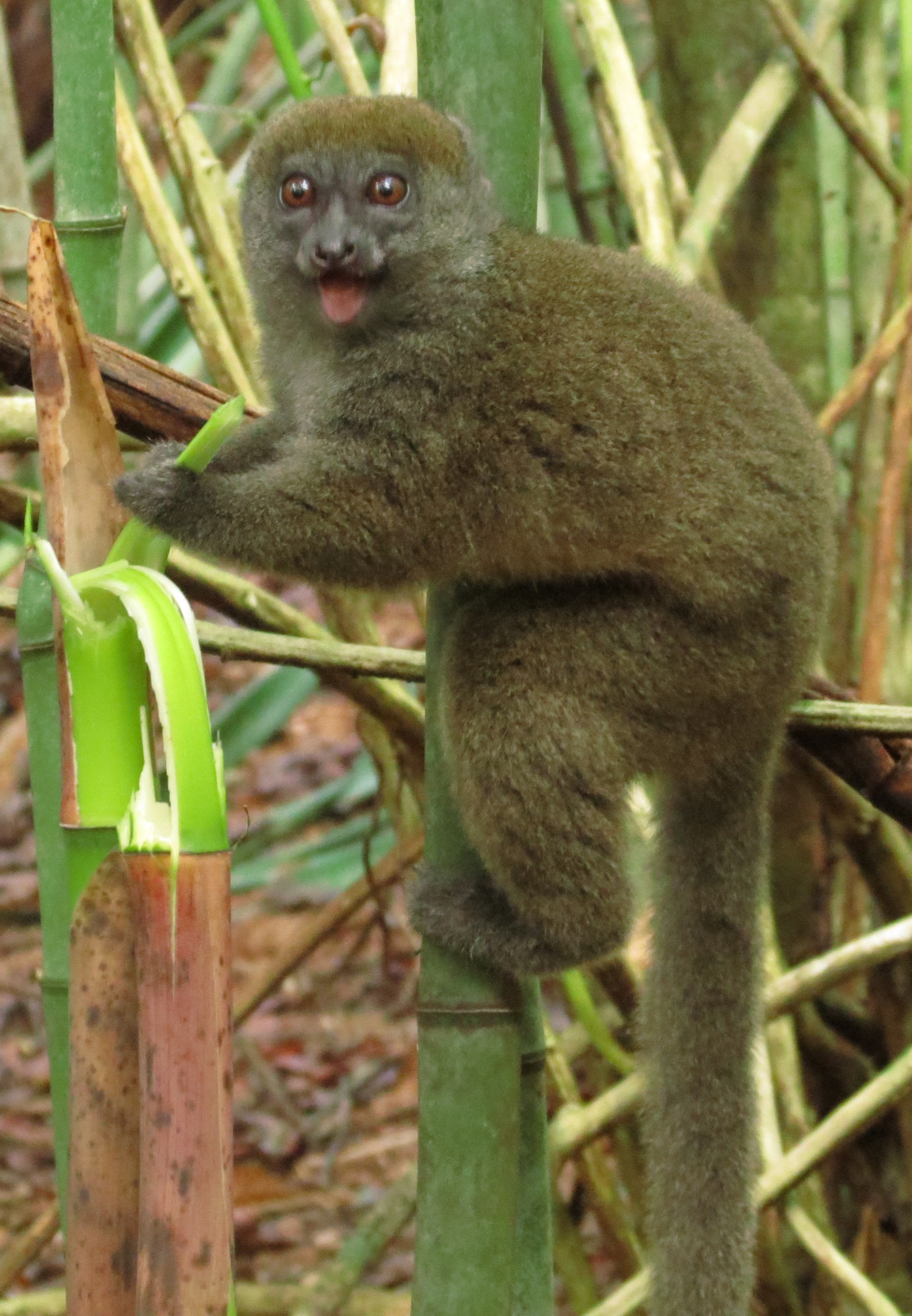

Conservation status
- Vulnerable (IUCN 3.1)
- CITES Appendix I

Scientific classification
- Kingdom: Animalia
- Phylum: Chordata
- Class: Mammalia
- Infraclass: Placentalia
- Order: Primates
- Suborder: Strepsirrhini
- Family: Lemuridae
- Genus: Hapalemur
- Species: H. occidentalis

Binomial name
- Hapalemur occidentalis Rumpler, 1975
- Distribution of H. occidentalis

= Western lesser bamboo lemur =

Species of lemur

The western lesser bamboo lemur (Hapalemur occidentalis), also known as the northern bamboo lemur, western gentle lemur, or Sambirano lesser bamboo lemur, is a species of bamboo lemur endemic to Madagascar.

== Description ==
The total length of this primate is 55–67 cm (22–26 in), more than half of which is tail, and average weight is just under 1 kilogram (2.2 lb).

== Distribution ==
It lives in several discontinuous areas in northern and western Madagascar including Ankarana and Analamerana in the north, Sambirano and the Ampasindava Peninsula in the north-west, and various areas in the west between the Mahavany and Tsiribihina Rivers. This lemur has been reported from eight national parks (Ankarana, Baie de Baly, Mananara-Nord, Marojejy, Masoala, Sahamalaza-Iles Radama, Tsingy de Namoroka and Zahamena), two strict nature reserves (Tsaratanana and Zahamena), and eight special reserves (Ambatovaky, Analamerana, Anjanaharibe-Sud, Bemarivo, Kasijy, Maningoza, Manongarivo, and Marotandrano).

== Ecology ==
Preferred habitat is dry deciduous forest and humid forest which have areas of bamboo and bamboo vines; but they can exist in stands of bamboo surrounded by rice fields and other agricultural land. Lives in groups of six individuals and tends to be active at night. Females have a gestation period of 137 to 140 days and give birth, usually to one infant, from October through to January. Food includes fruit, liana flowers and bamboo. Bamboo species include Dendrocalamus giganteus, Ochlandra capitata and Phyllostachys aurea. It co-exists with other species of lemurs.

== Status ==
This species is listed by the Convention on International Trade in Endangered Species of Wild Fauna and Flora (CITES) on Appendix 1 and the International Union for Conservation of Nature (IUCN) categorise this species as vulnerable. As long as there is some bamboo, the western lesser bamboo lemur is able survive in a degraded habitat. Burning the forest for livestock pasture is the major concern for this species as well as charcoal production and mining in Ankarana. In Makira hunting with firearms, machetes and slingshots occurs. There are eighteen individuals in European zoos.
