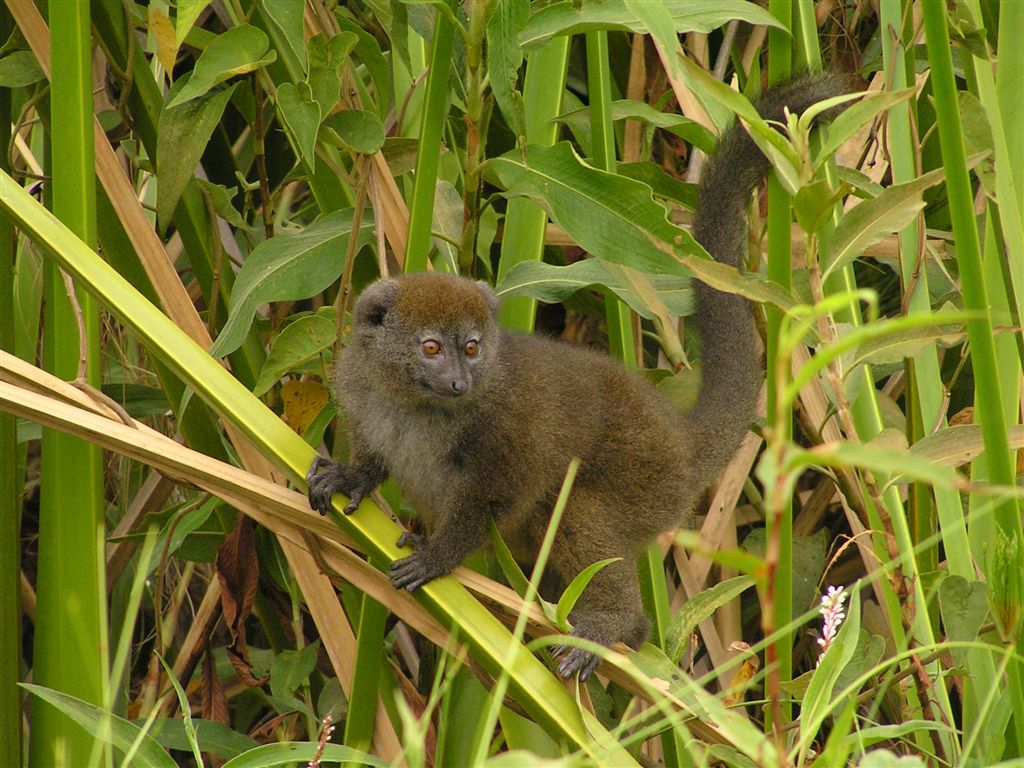
- Lac Alaotra bamboo lemur near Lake Alaotra

Conservation status
- Critically Endangered (IUCN 3.1)
- CITES Appendix I

Scientific classification
- Kingdom: Animalia
- Phylum: Chordata
- Class: Mammalia
- Order: Primates
- Suborder: Strepsirrhini
- Family: Lemuridae
- Genus: Hapalemur
- Species: H. alaotrensis

Binomial name
- Hapalemur alaotrensis Rumpler, 1975
- Distribution of H. alaotrensis

= Lac Alaotra bamboo lemur =

Species of lemur

The Lac Alaotra bamboo lemur (Hapalemur alaotrensis), also known as the Lac Alaotra gentle lemur, Alaotran bamboo lemur, Alaotran gentle lemur, Alaotra reed lemur, or locally as the bandro, is a bamboo lemur. It is endemic to the reed beds in and around Lac Alaotra, in northeast Madagascar. It is about 40 cm (16 in) long, with a similar length tail, and is a brownish-gray colour. It is the only bamboo lemur to live in and feed on papyrus reeds, and other reeds and grasses, and some authorities argue that it should be regarded as a subspecies of the eastern lesser bamboo lemur (Hapalemur griseus). The population of this lemur has been declining because of habitat destruction and the International Union for Conservation of Nature has rated it as being "critically endangered".

== Taxonomy ==
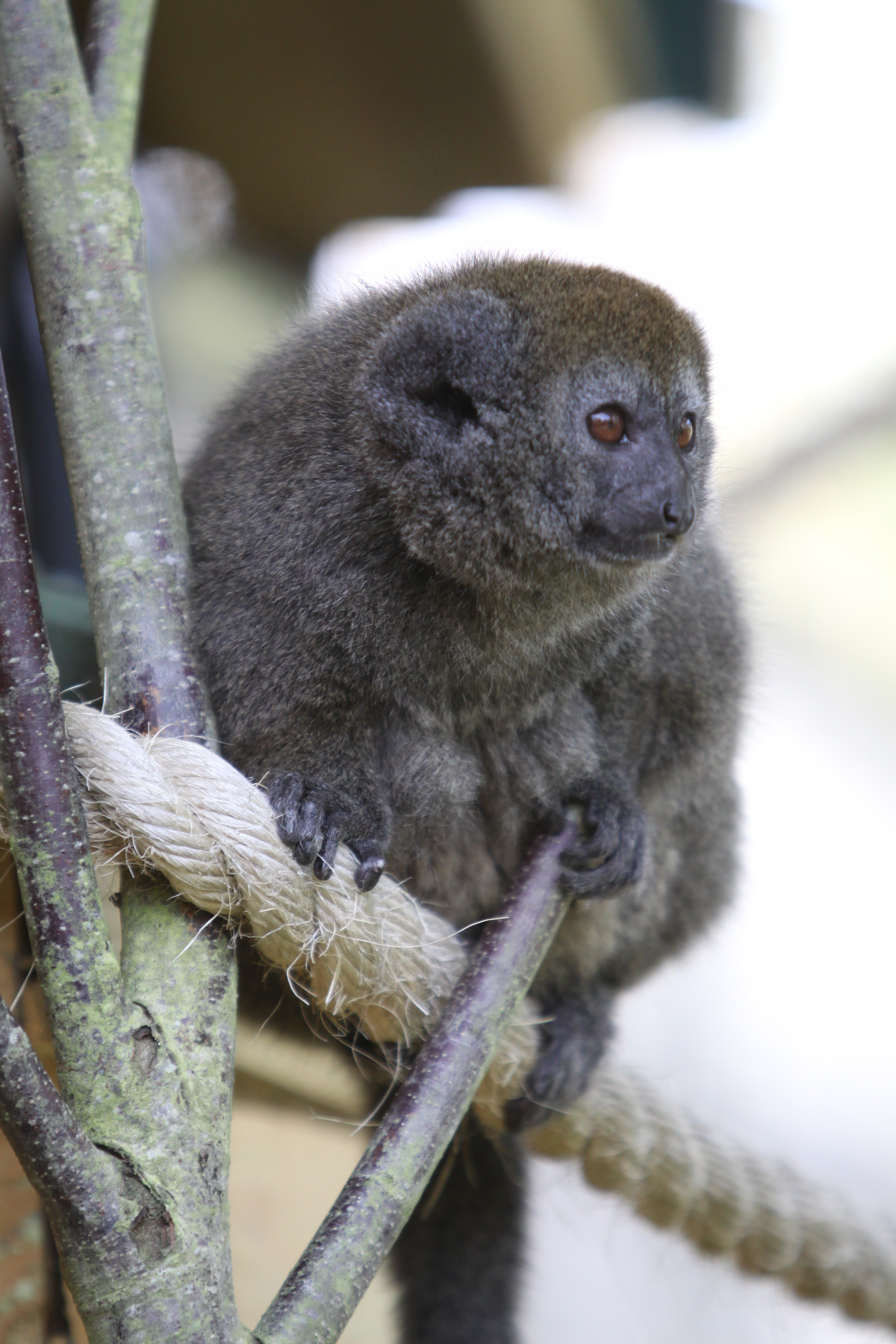
Lac Alaotra bamboo lemur at Jersey Zoo

The classification of the bandro is disputed, with some classifying it as a subspecies of Hapalemur griseus, while others see it as a separate species. Current genetic data do not support species status. Mitochondrial DNA sequences from the two populations H. g. griseus and H. g. alaotrensis are interspersed with each other on the phylogenetic tree. Moreover, average genetic distances between the two subspecies are within the range of within-taxon comparisons and not in the range of between-taxon comparisons. A final assessment of species versus subspecies status requires filling in gaps in sampling and the use of nuclear loci. GenBank, the universal repository for genetic sequence information, has not accepted the species status of the Aloatran lemur and lists it as a subspecies.

== Description ==
The tail and body of the Lac Alaotra bamboo lemur are both 40 cm (16 in) on average, and it weighs 1.1–1.4 kg (2.4–3.1 lb), with males slightly larger than females. Its dense, woolly fur is a gray-brown on the back, lighter gray on the face and chest, and chestnut brown on the head and neck.

== Ecology ==
This lemur is the only primate specifically adapted to living in papyrus reeds. Unlike other bamboo lemurs, the Lac Alaotra bamboo lemur does not eat bamboo; instead, it feeds on the stems of papyrus reeds, shoots of the grass Phragmites communis, and two other species of grasses (Echinochloa crus-galli and Leersia hexandra).

== Status ==
The population of Lac Alaotra bamboo lemur is declining as suitable habitat around the lake is being destroyed and converted to rice fields. Other threats include the burning of the marshland and hunting of the lemurs for food and the pet trade. The International Union for Conservation of Nature has rated this lemur as being "critically endangered", but a new 42,478 hectare protected area was created around the lake in 2007 which should provide some protection for the lemurs. The Durrell Wildlife Conservation Trust has a Lac Alaotra bamboo lemur conservation program, and some captive breeding is being done in zoos. The species is listed in CITES Appendix I.
