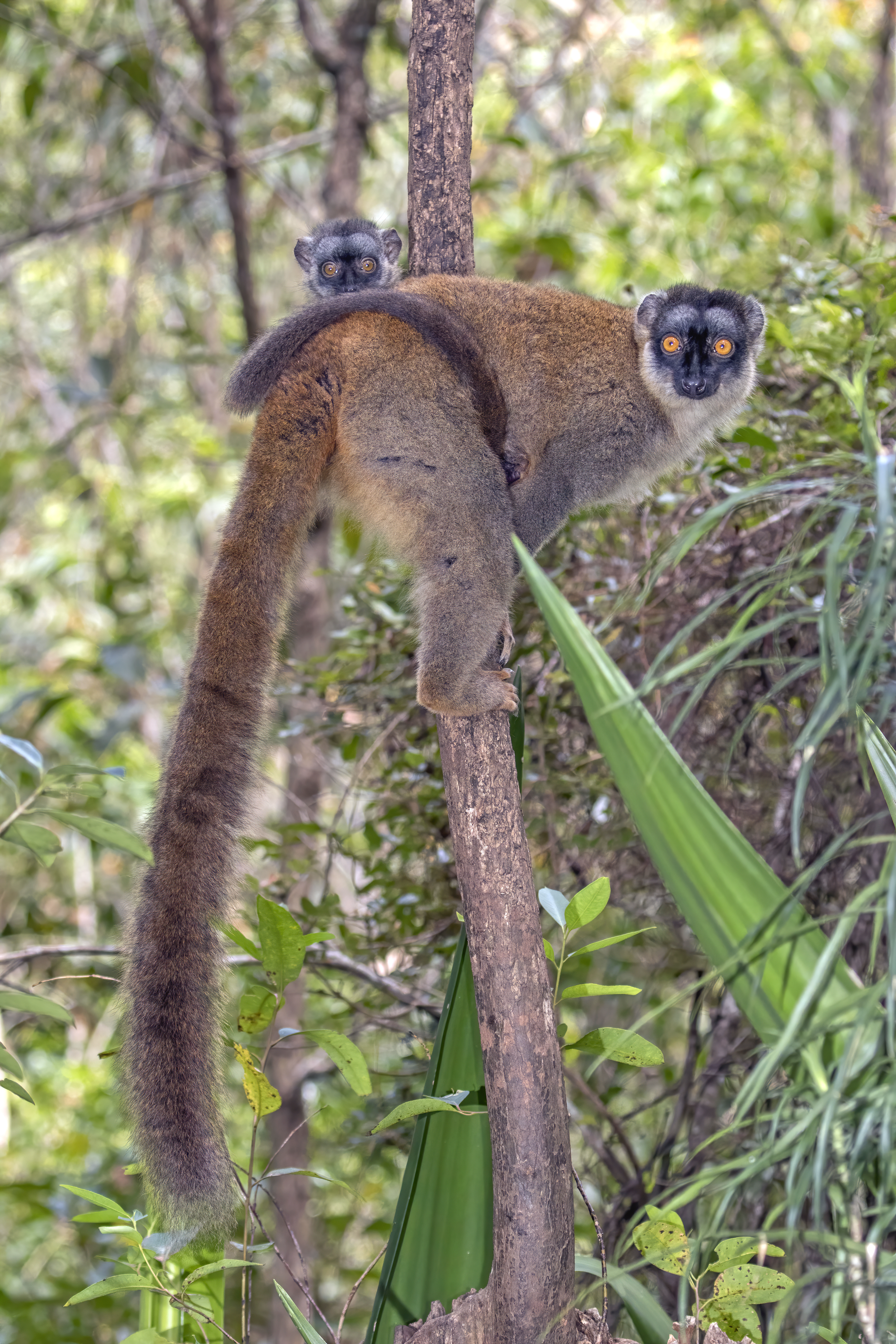
- Common brown lemur (E. fulvus), female with juvenile

Conservation status
- CITES Appendix I

Scientific classification
- Kingdom: Animalia
- Phylum: Chordata
- Class: Mammalia
- Order: Primates
- Suborder: Strepsirrhini
- Superfamily: Lemuroidea
- Family: Lemuridae; Gray, 1821

Type genus
- Lemur Linnaeus, 1758

Genera
- Lemur; Eulemur; Hapalemur; Prolemur; Varecia
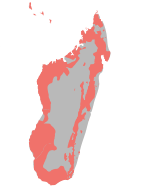
- Lemuridae distribution

= Lemuridae =

Family of lemurs

Lemuridae is a family of strepsirrhine primates native to Madagascar and the Comoros. They are represented by the Lemuriformes in Madagascar with one of the highest concentration of the lemurs. One of five families commonly known as lemurs, these animals were once thought to be the evolutionary predecessors of monkeys and apes, but this is no longer considered correct. They are formally referred to as lemurids.

== Classification ==
The family Lemuridae contains 21 extant species in five genera.

Family Lemuridae

- Genus Lemur
  - Lemur catta (ring-tailed lemur)
- Genus Eulemur, true lemurs
  - Eulemur fulvus (common brown lemur)
  - Eulemur sanfordi (Sanford's brown lemur)
  - Eulemur albifrons (white-headed lemur)
  - Eulemur rufus (red lemur)
  - Eulemur rufifrons (red-fronted lemur)
  - Eulemur collaris (collared brown lemur)
  - Eulemur cinereiceps (gray-headed lemur)
  - Eulemur macaco (black lemur)
  - Eulemur flavifrons (blue-eyed black lemur)
  - Eulemur coronatus (crowned lemur)
  - Eulemur rubriventer (red-bellied lemur)
  - Eulemur mongoz (mongoose lemur)
- Genus Varecia, ruffed lemurs
  - Varecia variegata (black-and-white ruffed lemur)
  - Varecia rubra (red ruffed lemur)
- Genus Hapalemur, bamboo lemurs
  - Hapalemur griseus (Eastern lesser bamboo lemur or gray gentle bamboo lemur)
  - Hapalemur meridionalis (Southern lesser bamboo lemur)
  - Hapalemur occidentalis (Western lesser bamboo lemur)
  - Hapalemur alaotrensis (Lac Alaotra gentle lemur)
  - Hapalemur aureus (golden bamboo lemur)
- Genus Prolemur
  - Prolemur simus (greater bamboo lemur)
- Genus †Pachylemur
  - †Pachylemur insignis
  - †Pachylemur jullyi

This family was once broken into two subfamilies, Hapalemurinae (bamboo lemurs and the greater bamboo lemur) and Lemurinae (the rest of the family), but molecular evidence and the similarity of the scent glands have since placed the ring-tailed lemur with the bamboo lemurs and the greater bamboo lemur.

Lemur species in the genus Eulemur are known to interbreed, despite having dramatically different chromosome numbers. Red-fronted (2N=60) and collared brown (2N=50–52) lemurs were found to hybridize at Berenty Reserve, Madagascar.

== Characteristics ==
Lemurids are medium-sized arboreal primates, ranging from 32 to 56 cm (13 to 22 in) in length, excluding the tail, and weighing from 0.7 to 5 kg (1.5 to 11.0 lb). They have long, bushy tails and soft, woolly fur of varying coloration. The hindlegs are slightly longer than the forelegs, although not enough to hamper fully quadrupedal movement (unlike the sportive lemurs). Most species are highly agile, and regularly leap several metres between trees. They have a good sense of smell and binocular vision. All but one species (the ring-tailed lemur) lack a tapetum lucidum, a reflective layer in the eye that improves night vision. Among mammals, activity cycles are either strictly diurnal or nocturnal, however, these can widely vary across species. In general, lemur activity has evolved from nocturnal to diurnal. Some lemurs are also cathemeral, an activity pattern where an animal is neither strictly diurnal nor nocturnal.

Lemurids are herbivorous, eating predominantly fruits and leaves, with some species consuming nectar, gums, and insects. However, the composition of their diets varies greatly depending on the species. Most lemurids have the dental formula 2.1.3.32.1.3.3. Some subfossil records have contributed to the knowledge of the currently extant lemurs from the Holocene by showing the changes in their dental records in habitats near human activity. This demonstrates that lemur species such as the ring-tailed lemur and the common brown lemur were forced to switch their primary diet to a group of secondary food sources.

With most lemurids, the mother gives birth to one or two young after a gestation period of between 120 and 140 days, depending on species. The ruffed lemur species are the only lemurids that have true litters, consisting of anywhere from two to six offspring. They are generally sociable animals, living in groups of up to thirty individuals in some species. In some cases, such as the ring-tailed lemur, the groups are long-lasting, with distinct dominance hierarchies, while in others, such as the common brown lemur, the membership of the groups varies from day to day, and seems to have no clear social structure.

Some of the lemur traits include low basal metabolic rate, highly seasonal breeders, adaptations to unpredictable climate and female dominance. Female dominance is expressed in lemurs with the females and males being sexually monomorphic and females having priority access to food. Lemurs live in groups of 11 to 17 animals, where females tend to stay within their natal groups and the males migrate. Male lemurs are competitive to win their mates which causes instability among the other organisms. Lemurs are able to mark their territory by using scents from local areas.

A number of lemur species are considered threatened; two species are critically endangered, one species is endangered, and five species are rated as vulnerable.

== Habitat ==
The highly seasonal dry deciduous forest of Madagascar alternates between dry and wet seasons, making it uniquely suitable for lemurs. Lemur species diversity increases as the number of tree species in an area increase and is also higher in forests that have been disturbed over undisturbed areas. Evidence from the subfossil records show that many of the now extinct lemurs actually lived in much drier climates than the currently extant lemurs.
