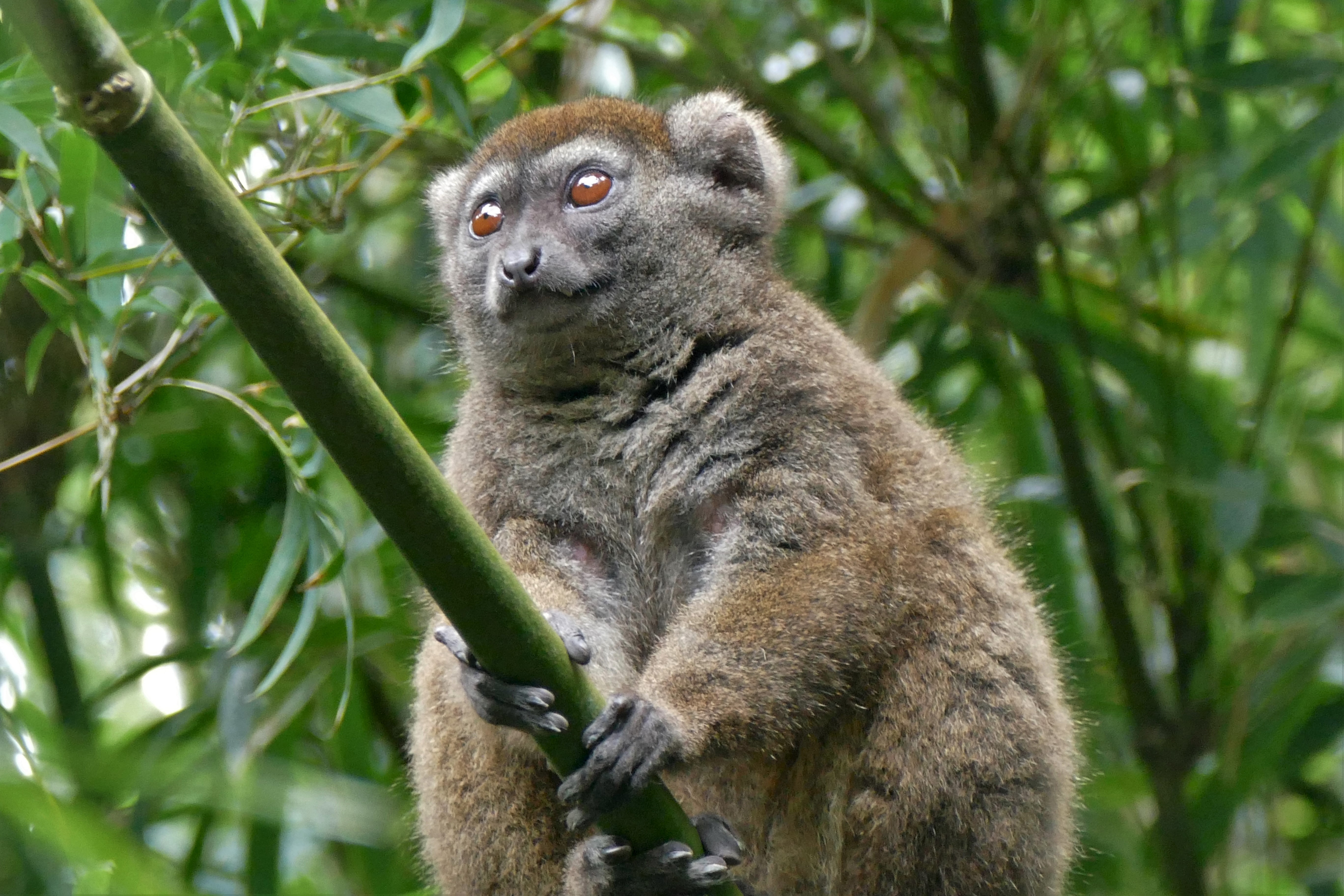

Conservation status
- Vulnerable (IUCN 3.1)
- CITES Appendix I

Scientific classification
- Kingdom: Animalia
- Phylum: Chordata
- Class: Mammalia
- Infraclass: Placentalia
- Order: Primates
- Suborder: Strepsirrhini
- Family: Lemuridae
- Genus: Hapalemur
- Species: H. meridionalis

Binomial name
- Hapalemur meridionalis Warter et al., 1987
- Distribution of H. meridionalis

= Southern lesser bamboo lemur =

Species of lemur

The southern lesser bamboo lemur (Hapalemur meridionalis), also known as the southern bamboo lemur, rusty-gray lesser bamboo lemur, and southern gentle lemur, is a species of bamboo lemur endemic to southern Madagascar.

== Taxonomy ==
It was originally considered to be a subspecies of the eastern lesser bamboo lemur (Hapalemur griseus), and is of similar size, but is darker and redder than the eastern lesser bamboo lemur, with a shorter tail and different vocalizations. The type locality is the forestry station of Mandena, and it is further supported as a separate species by recent mitochondrial DNA research. It is possible that hybridisation with H griseus occurs on the Andringitra Massif at altitudes of 1,600 m (5,200 ft).

== Distribution ==
The precise distribution is not known but it is found in south-eastern Madagascar from the Mananara River south to Andohahela and up to an altitude of 1,500 m (4,900 ft). This species is found in three national parks; (Andohahela, Andringitra and Midongy du Sud), three special reserves (Kalambatritra, Manombo and Pic d' Ivohibe), Tsitongambarika Protected Area, and in the Mandena Conservation Zone.

== Ecology ==
It is thought that this species is cathemeral, (i.e. it has sporadic and random intervals of activity during the day or night) and inhabits subtropical moist lowland and montane forests up to 1,600 m (5,200 ft). They live in groups of four to seven and sometimes there is more than one breeding female. Latrine behaviour has been observed where adults urinate, in turn, at specific sites followed by juveniles – it is thought this behaviour could be territorial or has some other communication function. In Madena forest groups forage on the ground eating various grasses in areas of sparse tree cover and swamps, and have also been observed in reed beds along the estuaries of Evahtra.

== Conservation ==
The southern lesser bamboo lemu is listed by the Convention on International Trade in Endangered Species of Wild Fauna and Flora (CITES) on Appendix 1 and the International Union for Conservation of Nature (IUCN) categorise this species as vulnerable.
