= Mandena Conservation Zone =

Conservation zone in Madagascar

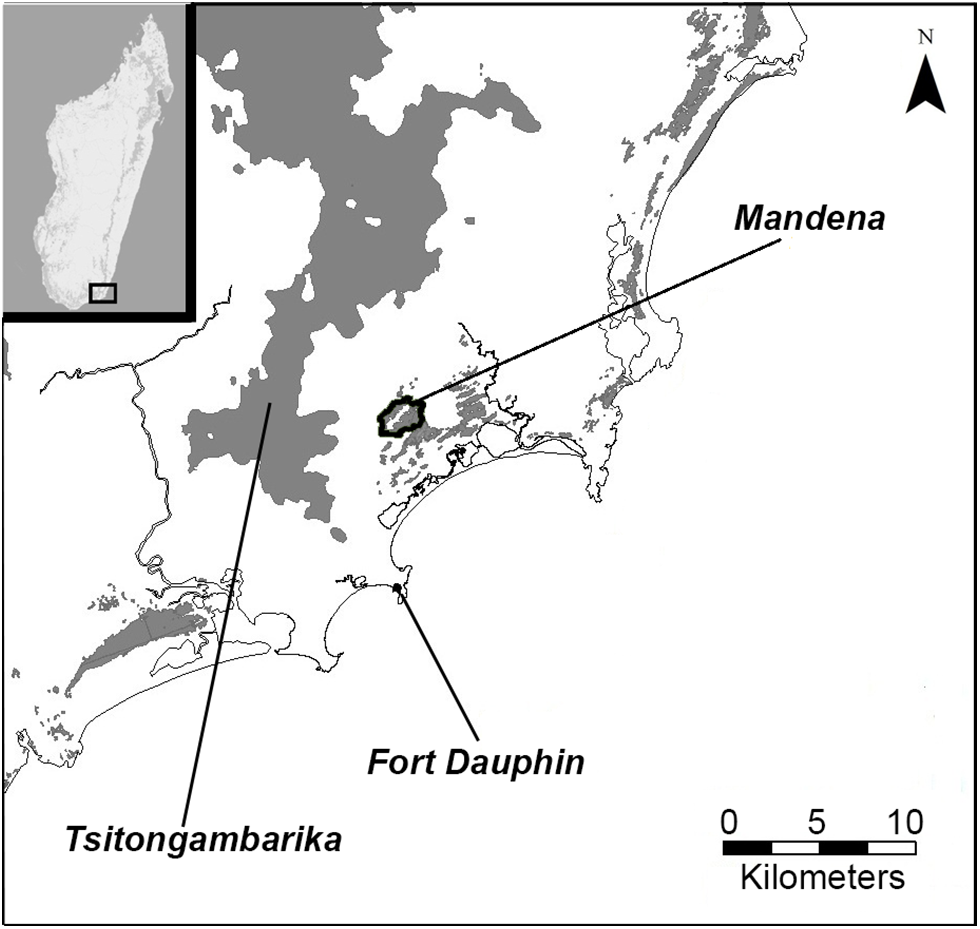
- Area of zone

- Location within Madagascar
- Coordinates: 24.95°S 46.99°E

Area
  - Land: 148 ha (370 acres)
  - Water: 82 ha (200 acres)

Mandena Conservation Zone is a conservation zone in southeast Madagascar.

== Description ==
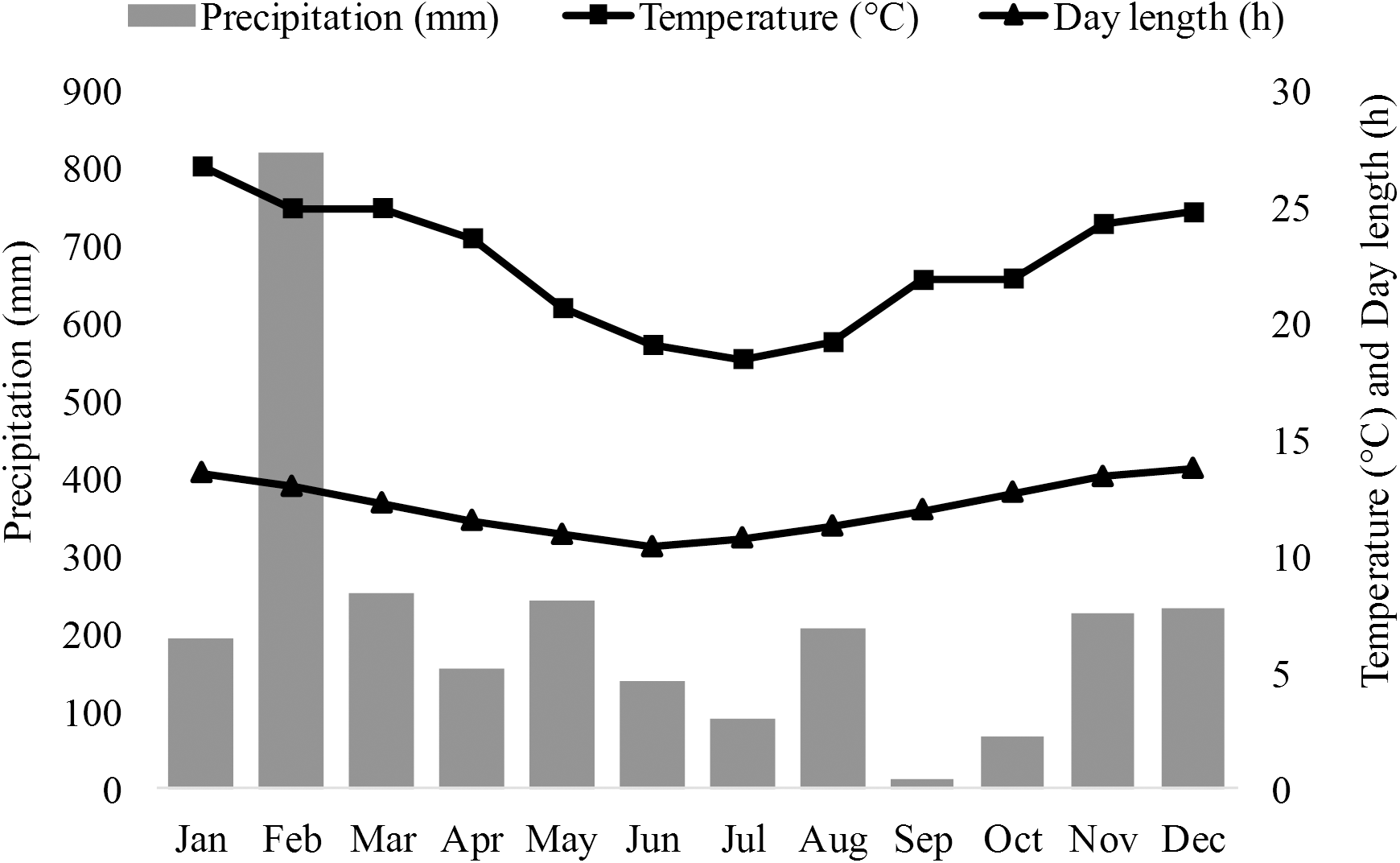
Rainfall

The zone is located 10 kilometres north of Fort Dauphin, three kilometres from the southeast coast of the island country. The zone has 82 hectares of swamp and 148 hectares of littoral forest. Its 2,800 millimetres of rainfall mostly occur in the November to April rainy season; the zone has a temperature range of 9.5 to 35 degrees Celsius.

The zone is inhabited by Ganzhorn's mouse lemur, eastern fat-tailed dwarf lemur, greater dwarf lemur, southern woolly lemur, Southern lesser bamboo lemur, collared brown lemurs and the Madagascan flying fox.

== See also ==
- Andohahela National Park
- Mandena mine, nearby
