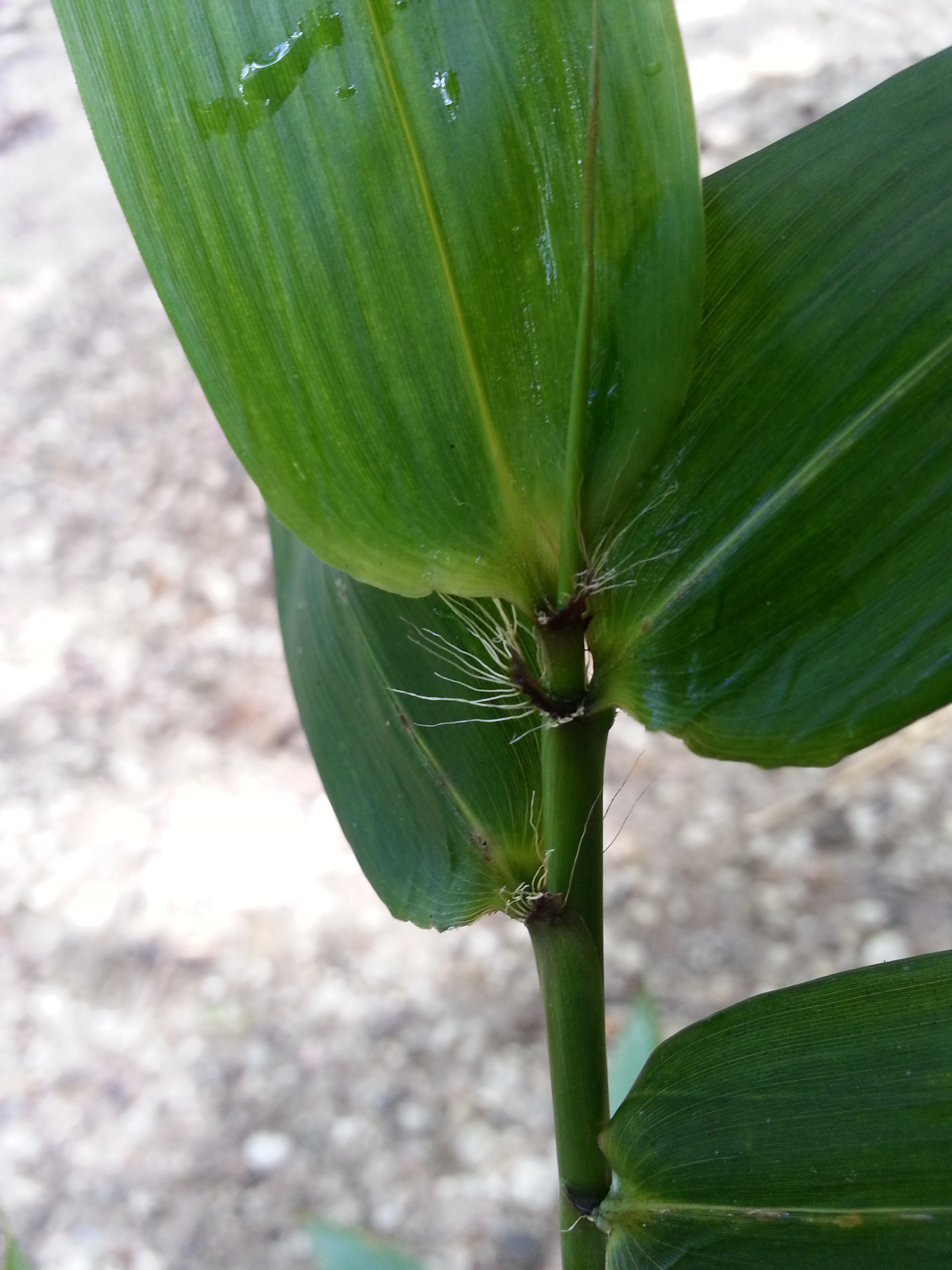

Scientific classification
- Kingdom: Plantae
- Clade: Tracheophytes
- Clade: Angiosperms
- Clade: Monocots
- Clade: Commelinids
- Order: Poales
- Family: Poaceae
- Genus: Cathariostachys
- Species: C. madagascariensis

Binomial name
- Cathariostachys madagascariensis (A.Camus) S.Dransf.

Synonyms
- Cephalostachyum madagascariense A.Camus

= Cathariostachys madagascariensis =

Madagascar giant bamboo

Species of grass

Cathariostachys madagascariensis, the Madagascar giant bamboo, volohosy, or voloto in Malagasy language, is a bamboo species found in Madagascar.

== Description ==
The culms are tall and erect, usually between 10 and 15 metres (33 and 49 ft) but occasionally reaching up to 22 metres (72 ft); with arching or drooping upper sections often leaning on nearby trees or vegetation for partial support. Culm diameters vary between 5 and 8 (up to 12) cm in diameter with internodes between 40 and 60 cm. Young shoots are pale to purplish green and covered with sharp, stiff, black to brown hairs. The rhizomes have very long, narrow necks, 2 to 4 metres (6.6 to 13.1 ft) long, which help it to spread much more rapidly than most clumping forms of bamboo. Shoots are quite bitter and have high concentrations of cyanide. Flowers are both determinant and hemispherical, an unusual form for bamboos. Leaves are oblong-lanceolate in shape, either acute or cupsidate tips, and a rounded base that contracts into the petiole. The leaves are roughly 8-23 cm long and 1.3-4.5 cm wide with 8-9 lateral veins. The capitulum are roughly 3-4 cm in diameter. The spikelets are roughly 20-23 mm long. The culms only flower once, but shoots can form indefinitely.

== Range and habitat ==
C. madagascariense is endemic to the interior of Madagascar and can be found in lower montane forests, at forest margins, in disturbed forest, or in areas of open ground at elevations between 800 and 1,000 metres (2,600 and 3,300 ft). It is found principally in the central (Analamazaotra and around Moramunga, east of the capital Antananarivo) and southeast (Ranomafana National Park and around Ifanadiana) regions where it receives sufficient rainfall.

== Ecology ==
It is the main food source for several species of bamboo lemurs, the only primates to subsist principally on bamboo. The destruction of the C. madagascarensis habitat due to slash and burn agriculture and over harvesting of natural stands has drastically reduced the range of both the greater bamboo lemur and especially the golden bamboo lemur. It is unknown how the lemurs can process the high amounts of cyanide, particularly in its growing shoots, without any harm.

== Taxonomy ==
It was originally classified as a new species of Cephalostachys by Aimée Camus in 1925, published in the Bulletin de la Société Botanique de France. The differentiating features are as follows:

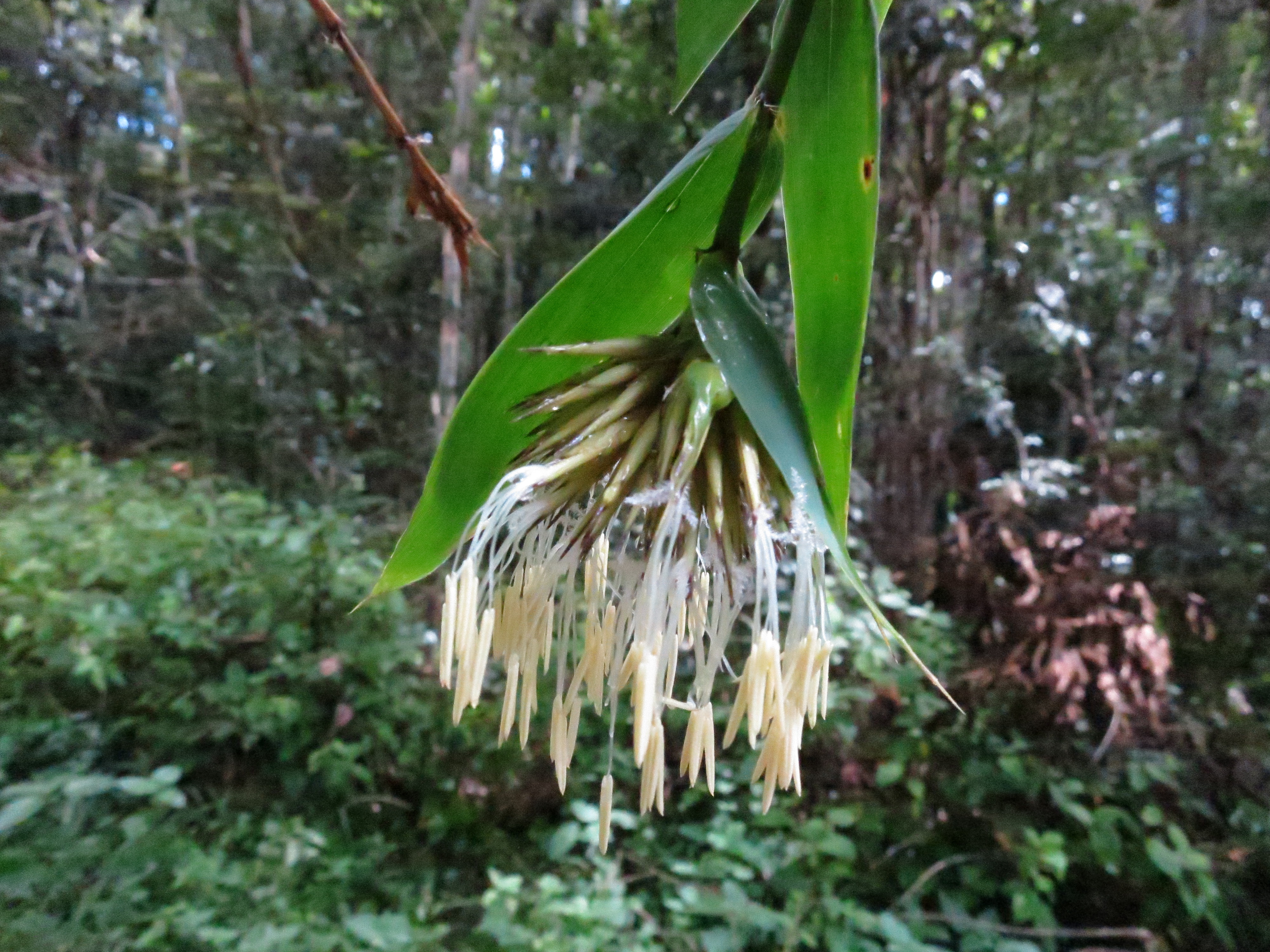
Madagascar Giant Bamboo Flower

- Sterile and fertile spikelets are the same
- Spikelets covered in small hairs
- Palea leaves have an indented cleft at the tip
- Palea do not extend past the lemma
- Hemispherical capitula

In 1998, in part due to the prior encouragement of the late Dr. T.R. Soderstrom of the Smithsonian, S. Dransfield reexamined the classification of several bamboos from Madagascar. Dr. S. Dransfield determined that, although sharing many similar characteristics with Cephalostachys, C. capitata and C. madagascariensis are distinct from Cephalostachys. She placed both in the new genus Cathariostachys.
