= Niels Bolwig =

- Born: 26 September 1911; Frederiksberg, Copenhagen
- Died: 10 September 2004 (aged 92); Bath, Somerset, United Kingdom
- Resting place: Haycombe Cemetery, Bath
- Education: Copenhagen University
- Known for: first successful rearing of an orphaned infant African elephant
- Scientific career
- Fields: Zoology
- Workplaces: University of Witwatersrand; Makerere College; Ibadan University; University of Oklahoma; Oklahoma City Zoo; National University of Lesotho

Niels Bolwig (26 September 1911 – 10 September 2004) was a Danish zoologist, behavioural biologist, entomologist, lecturer and professor, known for the first documented successful hand-rearing of an orphaned infant elephant and one of the first biologists to study primates in the wild.

== Career and life ==
Niels Bolwig was a behavioural biologist who was one of the first to study primates in the wild. Born 1911 in Frederiksberg, Copenhagen, in Denmark, and exams at Schneekloths skole, he became biologist and zoologist at Copenhagen University and spent most of his working life in Africa, retiring in 1979 to England.

He was 1946–1959 lector in zoology at University of Witwatersrand, 1959-1962 Makerere College, 1962–1966 and 1970–19772 professor at Ibadan University, with a break at University of Oklahoma when he was also working as Scientific curator at Oklahoma City Zoo. 1973–1975 Copenhagen University and from 1977 professor in Biology at National University of Lesotho.

1947 he built a marine biology station on Inhaca Island, and in the 1950s took part in several expeditions to study the ecology of insects and rodents in the Kalahari Desert.

Bolwig became one of the first to do ethological studies of primates in the wild, encouraged by the anatomist Raymond Dart, and took up the study of primates in order to throw light on the behaviour of early and modern man by carrying out comparative behavioural studies on primates and aboriginal people like the pygmies.

He also went to the Kibale Forest near Ruwenzori, to study chimpanzees, macaques, and colobus monkeys, illustrated by hundreds of colour photographs, which still awaits publication.

Bolwig was married 1946 to Bridget Mary Bolwig (née Holmes), born 1911, died on 3 September 2006, and they had two daughters.

Niels Bolwig died at Bath, Somerset in the United Kingdom, 10 September 2004, and rests at Haycombe Cemetery, Bath.

== First hand rearing of orphaned elephant ==
When lecturing professor at Ibadan University, Nigeria in 1963, Bolwig successfully reared an orphaned infant African forest elephant from a few days old, by developing his own rich milk formula consisting of cows' milk and butter fat. This is believed to be the first successful rearing of an elephant outside Asia, and maybe world wide, since until then most rearing attempts had been unsuccessful due to diet intolerance.

In the International Zoo Yearbook article Observations on the early behaviour of a young african elephant from January 1965, Bolwig describes how an orphaned African forest elephant was brought to Ibadan University on 13 December 1963, after her mother was shot in self-defence, when charging a hunter. The elephant calf was assumed to be about a week old, still having its umbilical cord, and was in good condition, but thin after a week without food. The successful rearing in a garage on the University, is the first scientific description of its kind, and therefore considered being the first documented successful attempt.

== Selected publications ==
- Honningbiens Liv (1942)
- Senses and Sense Organs of the Anterior End of the House Fly Larvae, 1946.
- Study of the Nests Built by Mountain Gorilla and Chimpanzee, South African Journal of Science, 1959, LV 286–91.
- A Comparative Study of the Behaviour of various Lemurs, Memoires de L'Institut Scientifique de Madagascar, Ser. A, Tome XIV 205–17.
- From Mosquitoes to Elephants, autobiography (1988).
