= Andringitra National Park =

- IUCN category II (national park)
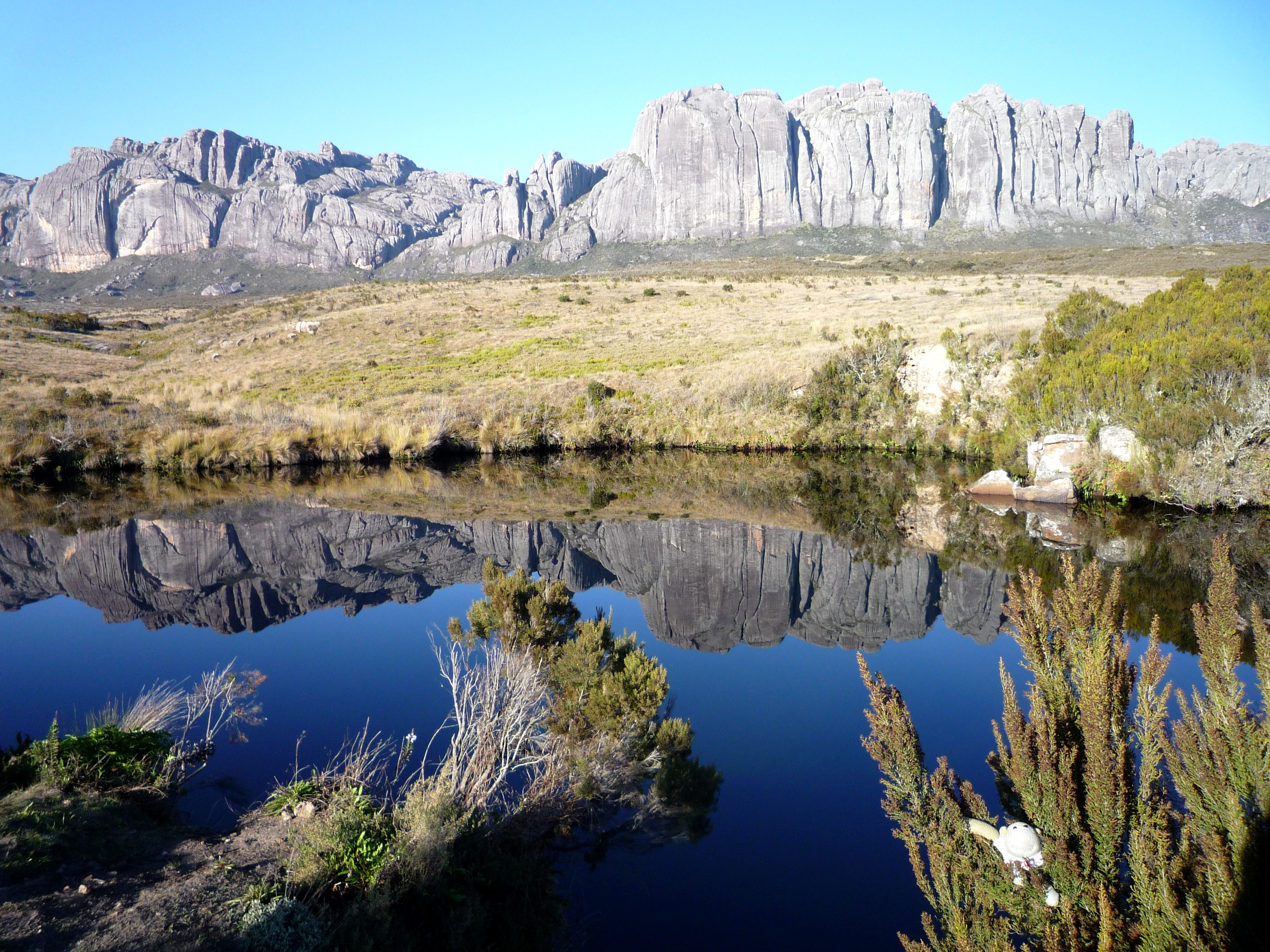

- Location within Madagascar
- Location: Haute Matsiatra, Madagascar
- Nearest city: Ambalavao
- Coordinates: 22°6′46″S 46°55′23″E
- Area: 311.60 km^{2} (120.31 sq mi)
- Established: 31 December 1927 (as nature reserve); 8 October 1999 (as national park)
- Visitors: 3,436 (in 2011)
- Governing body: Madagascar National Parks Association (PNM-ANGAP)
- Website: www.parcs-madagascar.com/parcs/andringitra.php

UNESCO World Heritage Site
- Official name: Parc National d'Andringitra
- Part of: Rainforests of the Atsinanana
- Criteria: Natural: (ix), (x)
- Reference: 1257-012
- Inscription: 2007 (31st Session)
- Endangered: 2010
- Area: 32,074.5 ha (79,258 acres)

Andringitra National Park is a national park in the Haute Matsiatra region of Madagascar, 47 kilometres (29 mi) south of Ambalavao. The park was established in 1999 and is managed by the Madagascar National Parks Association. It was inscribed in the World Heritage Site in 2007 as part of the Rainforests of the Atsinanana.

The reserve, which covers 31,160 hectares (77,000 acres), contains Madagascar's second highest mountain, and four rivers. Three people groups inhabit the region: The Bara people, the Bara Haronga, and the Betsileo people.

Andringitra National Park is biodiverse, containing a variety of species of plants, birds, and frogs. It also contains thirteen species of lemurs.

== History ==
The importance of the area was noted by explorers in the early 20th century, and in 1927, the central part of the mountain range was declared a "Strict Nature Reserve". During the early 1990s, the Malagasy Environmental Action Plan introduced the idea of Madagascar taking ownership of the environmental agenda, rather than donors, and in 1999, the area became a National Park. In 2007, the park became part of the Rainforests of the Atsinanana World Heritage Site.

== Geography ==
The reserve covers 31,160 hectares (77,000 acres) covering much of the granite massif of the Andringitra mountains which rise above plains. The altitude of the reserve varies from 700 metres (2,300 ft) to the peak of the second highest mountain in the country, Imarivolanitra (formerly Pic Boby) at 2,658 metres (8,720 ft). The mean annual rainfall is 1,500–2,500 millimetres (59–98 in) and snowfall occurs in some years. Madagascar's lowest temperature, −8 °C (18 °F) has been recorded here. The Ampanasana, Iantara, Menarahaka and Zomandao rivers run through the reserve.

Three different groups of people live within the park. In the south and west the Bara people graze cattle on the savannah and in the valleys and on the ridges, while in the east the Bara Haronga grow rice, and the Betsileo people have developed an irrigation system on the mountain flanks of the north for rice cultivation.

== Flora and fauna ==
The park is one of the most biologically diverse places in Madagascar, with many endemic species. The eastern flank of the massif is covered with humid forest, and humid grassland and scrub in the higher areas. On the western flank there is relatively dry forest. There are over one thousand species of plants, one hundred species of birds, and fifty-five species of frogs are known to inhabit the park.

There are over fifty species of mammals, including thirteen species of lemur. Andringitra's ring-tailed lemur population has notably thicker fur than the rest of the island's population. This is likely an adaptation to the colder climate at high altitudes.

List of lemur species found in Andringitra National Park
Viewing time	Species
Daytime	Ring-tailed lemur (Lemur catta); Southern lesser bamboo lemur (Hapalemur meridionalis); Golden bamboo lemur (Hapalemur aureus); Greater bamboo lemur (Prolemur simus); Common brown lemur (Eulemur fulvus); Red-fronted lemur (Eulemur rufifrons); Red-bellied lemur (Eulemur rubriventer); Milne-Edwards's sifaka (Propithecus edwardsi)
Nighttime	Brown mouse lemur (Microcebus rufus); Greater dwarf lemur (Cheirogaleus major); Small-toothed sportive lemur (Lepilemur microdon); Peyrieras's woolly lemur (Avahi peyrierasi); Aye-aye (Daubentonia madagascariensis)

== See also ==
- List of national parks of Madagascar
