= Analamerana Special Reserve =

Wildlife reserve in the north of Madagascar

- IUCN category IV (habitat/species management area)
- Location within Madagascar
- Location: Northern Madagascar
- Coordinates: 12°48′S 49°30′E
- Area: 750.88
- Established: 1956
- Governing body: Madagascar National Parks

Analamerana Special Reserve (or Analamera) is a 347 square kilometres (134 sq mi) wildlife reserve in the north of Madagascar. The reserve was created in 1956 to protect its endemic plants and animals, such as the critically endangered Perrier's sifaka (Propithecus perrieri), which is considered to be one of the most endangered primates in the world.

== Geography ==
Analamera is in the Diana Region, of northern Madagascar and the range in altitude is between sea level on the east coast, up to 648 metres (2,126 ft), within the highlands of Ankarana. The reserve is a karstic eroding limestone plateau, between the Indian Ocean and the Ankarana-Analamerana massif. It is bordered by the mouth of the Irodo River on the east, by the Iloky River to the south, in the west by streams flowing into the Anivorano River and on the north, steep rocks in the Sava Region. The wet season is from November to March and the annual rainfall is from 980 millimetres (39 in) to 1,500 millimetres (59 in). Due to the lack of infrastructure the reserve is difficult to access, with the best time to visit, during the dry season from May to September.

The nearest town is Anivorano Nord. The roads around the reserve are poor and Diego Suarez provides the easiest access point.

== Flora and fauna ==
Along the coast there is mangrove forest and inland, dry forest with many rare species, including three species of baobab, several palm trees species and wild coffee. This is one of the last remaining areas where Perrier's sifaka remain. Other lemurs on the reserve are the crowned lemur (Eulemur coronatus) and Sanford's brown lemur (Eulemur sanfordi).

== See also ==
- List of national parks of Madagascar
- Ankarana Reserve – a nearby reserve
