= Arboreality =

2022 book by Rebecca Campbell

- Author: Rebecca Campbell
- Language: English
- Genre: Climate fiction
- Set in: Vancouver Island, c. 2050-2100
- Publisher: Stelliform Press
- Publication date: 28 Sep 2022
- Publication place: Canada
- Pages: 126 (Paperback)
- Awards: 2023 Ursula K. Le Guin Prize
- ISBN: 9781777682323

Arboreality is a 2022 book by Rebecca Campbell. It is a collection of six related stories set on or near Vancouver Island and take place over several decades, 2050 to 2100. They describe a community's survival through a climate apocalypse. The book includes Campbell's short story "An Important Failure", which won the 2021 Theodore Sturgeon Award. The collection won the 2023 Ursula K. Le Guin Prize.

== Plot ==
=== Special Collections ===
Climate change and pandemics lead to a gradual societal collapse. Jude, a professor who teaches online classes at the University of Victoria, visits the on-campus McPherson Library. The building is in disrepair; severe water damage threatens many rare books. He and the librarian Berenice plan to save as many books as possible. They begin dismantling the collection, shipping books to volunteers across Canada for preservation.

Jude gives a set of old coastline charts to Dr. Tremblay. This angers the old professor, who is unable to accept that the university no longer exists in a coherent form. As Jude drives away, he observes a genetically modified golden arbutus tree. He reflects that the new tree exists for a new world.

=== Controlled Burn ===
A widower named Bernard plants native species in his garden, hoping to replace his lawn with a more natural set of vegetation. Bernard's neighbors gradually move away, leaving him alone on the street. Over the next few years, Bernard gradually removes the lawns and creates a new local ecosystem. When his last phone dies, Bernard visits a local library for research. He finds a book about eco-architecture, which was rescued from the McPherson by Jude. A fire begins in Bernard’s neighborhood. He reminisces about his life with his deceased wife Jen and his daughter Octavia. The fire moves closer toward him.

High above Earth, an astronaut named Noor watches the progress of wildfires destroying Western Canada. She sees that some plants begin to grow back, even after the immense destruction.

=== An Important Failure ===
The story is told out of chronological order.

In 1607, a spruce begins to germinate in Canada. The Earth experiences a Little Ice Age. Antonio Stradivari makes his first violin. In the 2020s, Masami Lucretia Delgado is born. As she grows up, she falls in love with the violin and begins to play regularly. She is recognized as a child prodigy and performs worldwide. Luthier Eddie takes his apprentice Mason to hear Delgado play. Eddie states that Delgado’s violin is aging and will eventually become unplayable. Meanwhile, forest fires and climate change kill off old growth hardwood; no further violins of the same quality can be manufactured.

Years later, Mason and his brother Jacob illegally log a Sitka spruce. Mason plans to use his portion for tonewood. Their friend Sophie, a botanist and marijuana dealer, lives with them. Jacob and Sophie later marry. Mason visits them intermittently as they grow apart. Over the following years, Mason finishes the violin. He names the violin Nepenthe and gives it to Delgado. Delgado, now a teacher with a daughter of her own, accepts. She continues to play the violin daily for the next forty-five years, knowing that it will only reach its best sound many years after her death.

=== Scions and Root Stocks ===
Kit George is born in October 2055, the same week a wildfire destroys a large swath of British Columbia. He grows up in a world remade by climate change; he often asks his grandmother for stories of the olden days. He admires Benno, the grandson of a local librarian. Benno has preserved much of the knowledge of the old world. Benno teaches Kit to salvage glass, copper, and other valuable materials from old houses. During a salvage expedition, Kit explores with his companion Trish. They see golden arbutus trees which have been specifically shaped into a bench.

=== Pub Food ===
Jacob is diagnosed with cancer. Sophie tries to care for him, but has limited access to pain medication and no access to chemotherapy. With Benno’s help, she researches old cookbooks. Using her limited supplies, Sophie endeavors to prepare Jacob’s favorite foods from before the collapse of civilization.

=== The Cathedral Arboreal ===
In August 2100, Kit’s son Louis invites an elderly Sophie to a concert at the Cathedral Arboreal. Using the golden arbutus, Kit has developed a method to grow buildings from living plants. Visitors from mainland Canada arrive for the first time in decades. They bring a famous violinist for the concert. Kit, now a grandfather himself, gives tours to the Canadian visitors and teaches them about the local culture of Vancouver Island. Belinda, daughter of Masami Delgado, performs a concert on the Nepenthe violin. Kit contemplates his life and the future of his community. An omniscient narrator provides snapshots of various lives around the world while Belinda plays her violin.

== Style ==
The stories "Special Collections" and "Controlled Burn" are chronologically first. They are set in the 2050s in Victoria, British Columbia and the Cowichan Valley, respectively. The story "An Important Failure" takes "pride of place" in the collection, according to Brett Josef Grubisic. Finally, the stories "Scions and Root Stocks", "Pub Food", and "The Cathedral Arboreal" take place chronologically last. They are set approximately five decades after the first stories in the collection.

== Major themes ==
Dana McFarland wrote that the genre of speculative fiction is "the 'clonal colony' of literature from which Arboreality arises, and to which it contributes." The societal collapse detailed in Arboreality hearkens to classic works such as The Drowned World by J. G. Ballard and The Chrysalids by John Wyndham. McFarland also notes that Campbell's book could be compared to more modern works, including Station Eleven by Emily St. John Mandel. McFarland further noted that the book would be particularly resonant for citizens of British Columbia. The narrative calls to mind the 1997 felling of Kiidk'yaas, a sacred tree. The reviewer stated that "Campbell presents these respective narratives without partiality, offering insight into complex motivations of characters living in extreme circumstances."

McFarland stated that the theme of "hope" was explored through the interlocked stories in the book. In the initial stories, it is clear that institutions have failed. The characters are forced to look for new institutions into which hope might be placed. In later stories, hope is "built incrementally in communities, working in relationship with and learning about place." Campbell embraces the idea that hope can be "place-based". McFarland concluded her review by stating that "Arboreality offers to a present readership a humane vision from an imagined future, of the potential that arises from valuing connection and collaboration in and with place."

== Publication History ==
"An Important Failure" was first published by Clarkesworld Magazine in August 2020; it was later incorporated into Arboreality.

== Reception and awards ==
Writing for The British Columbia Review, Dana McFarland called the book a "serious undertaking" and a "narrative of disaster and resilience." McFarland compared the book's opening scene, in which Jude attempts to salvage books from the library, to the closing scene of Fahrenheit 451 by Ray Bradbury. McFarland highly recommended the book, encouraging readers to consider the possibility for avoiding a future ecological collapse by listening to its lessons.

Publishers Weekly wrote that Campbell "offers a bittersweet elegy to contemporary life that segues neatly into speculation about the impact of the coming climate crisis." Two subplots that provide through-lines for the story. The first is the saving of the library books by Jude and Berenice; the second is the construction of a violin. The review noted that the material is dark but that Campbell's tone is surprisingly hopeful in its depiction of the future. It concluded that this "compassionate cli-fi mosaic is sure to please genre fans."

Brett Josef Grubisic of Quill and Quire called the work "a startling novella-in-stories" and wrote that it was only a few degrees removed from reality. Grubisic noted that Campbell's style "favours complex storytelling that leaps across time and space," particularly with regards to the story "An Important Failure." The review felt that this story highlighted Campbell's "nimble intellect and magpie interests, though perhaps at the expense of narrative flow."

Year	Work	Award	Category	Result	Ref.
2021	"An Important Failure"	Aurora Award	Novelette/Novella	Nominated	
2021	"An Important Failure"	Theodore Sturgeon Award	—	Won	
2023	Arboreality	Philip K. Dick Award	—	Nominated	
2023	Arboreality	Ursula K. Le Guin Prize	—	Won	
