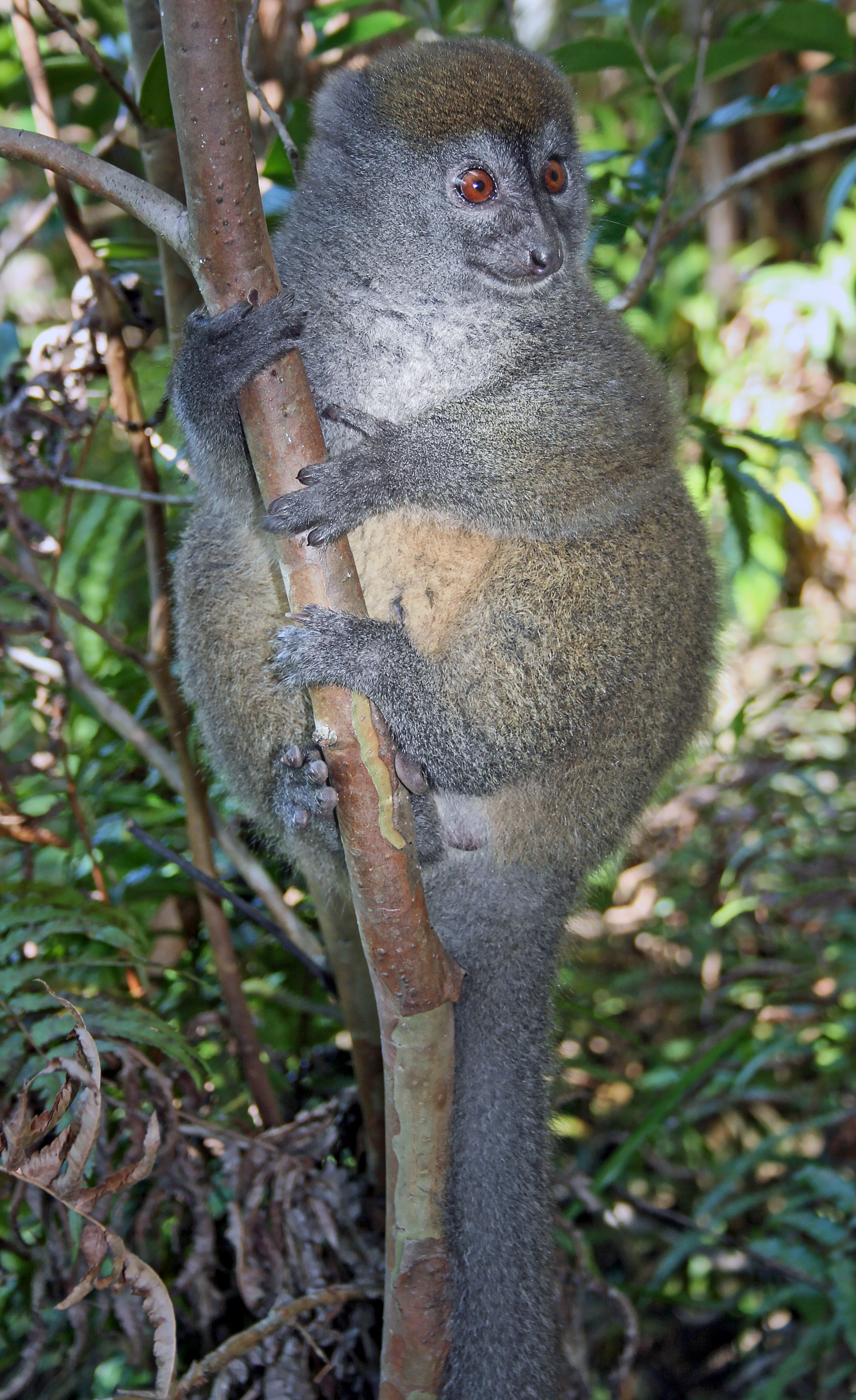

Conservation status
- Vulnerable (IUCN 3.1)
- CITES Appendix I

Scientific classification
- Kingdom: Animalia
- Phylum: Chordata
- Class: Mammalia
- Order: Primates
- Suborder: Strepsirrhini
- Family: Lemuridae
- Genus: Hapalemur
- Species: H. griseus

Binomial name
- Hapalemur griseus Link, 1795

Subspecies
- H. g. griseus (Link, 1795); H. g. gilberti (Rabarivol et al., 2007); H. g. ranomafanensis (Rabarivol et al., 2007)
- Distribution of H. griseus

Synonyms
- cinereus Desmarest, 1820; olivaceus I. Geoffroy, 1851; schlegeli Pocock, 1917

= Eastern lesser bamboo lemur =

Species of lemur

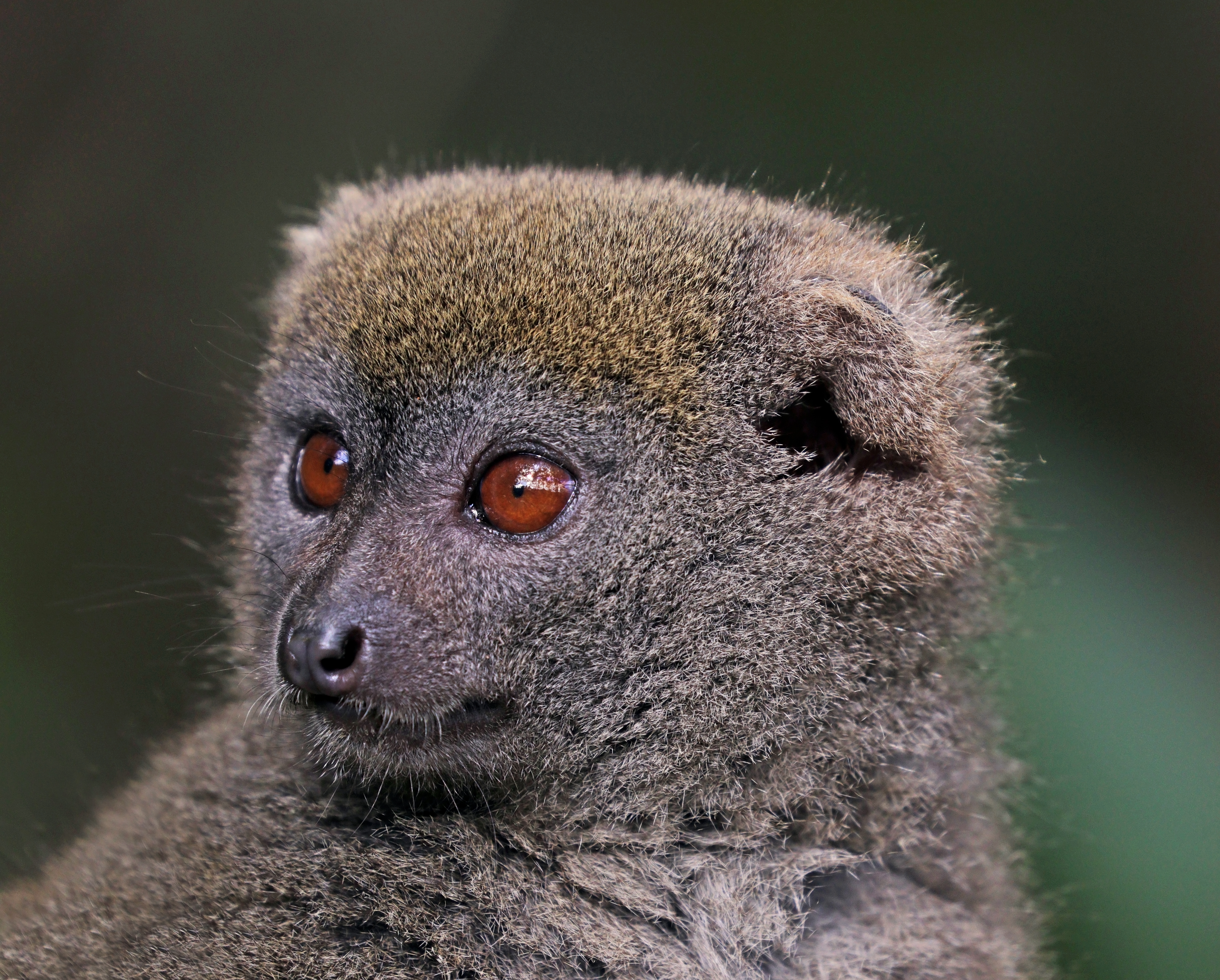
H. g. griseus

The eastern lesser bamboo lemur (Hapalemur griseus), also known as the gray bamboo lemur, the gray gentle lemur, and the Mahajanga lemur is a small lemur endemic to Madagascar, with three known subspecies. As its name suggests, the eastern lesser bamboo lemur feeds mainly on bamboo. The lemurs of the genus Hapalemur have more manual dexterity and hand–eye coordination than most lemurs. They are vertical climbers and jump from stalk to stalk in thick bamboo forests.

== Subspecies ==
Range of the three subspecies: red H. g. griseus green = H. g. ranomafanensis purple = H. g. gilberti

=== Eastern lesser bamboo lemur ===
The eastern lesser bamboo lemur (Hapalemur griseus griseus), also known as the gray bamboo lemur, eastern gray bamboo lemur, or gray gentle lemur, was the original species described in 1795 by Johann Heinrich Friedrich Link. It is grey in colour, sometimes with a red patch on its head. It averages 284 mm (11 in) in length with a tail of 370 mm (14.6 in), and a mass of 0.8 kg. Based on data from more than one hundred transect surveys which took place between 2004 and 2009, the population is estimated to be declining. There is an estimated 818 individuals in Ranomafana National Park and the decline in numbers is due to hunting and habitat loss. It is listed by the Convention on International Trade in Endangered Species of Wild Fauna and Flora (CITES) on Appendix 1 and the IUCN considers it to be vulnerable.

=== Gilbert's bamboo lemur ===
Gilbert's bamboo lemur (H. g. gilberti), also known as Gilbert's gentle lemur or Beanamalao bamboo lemur, was described as a subspecies in 2007, but was raised to species status in 2008. In 2010, it was returned to subspecies status. Its exact distribution is not certain but it is known from a small area of east-central Madagascar from its type locality of Beanamalao, from a small area north of the Nesivolo river and possibly from an area south of the Mangoro River and Onive River. This subspecies lives in dense bamboo stands and areas of bamboo vines and is threatened by habitat loss and degradation. The IUCN considered this subspecies to be 'data deficient' and it is listed by the Convention on International Trade in Endangered Species of Wild Fauna and Flora (CITES) on Appendix 1.

=== Ranomafana bamboo lemur ===
The Ranomafana bamboo lemur (H. g. ranomafanensis), or Ranomafana gentle lemur, is the third sub-species and is found in three widely separated populations. The exact distribution is not known but in the west of the island it is found in the forests of Tsingy de Bemaraha, probably as far north as the Betsiboka River, and in the Makay massif in the southwest of Madagascar. The eastern population can be found in forests south of the Mangoro River and the Onive River within Ranomafana National Park. It lives in stands of dense bamboo and bamboo vines within tropical moist lowland and montane forest with three-quarters of its diet being bamboo. It will also eat fig leaves, flowers, fungi, grass stems, small fruits and sugar cane. Due to habitat loss, the IUCN has categorised this species as vulnerable. It is listed by the Convention on International Trade in Endangered Species of Wild Fauna and Flora (CITES) on Appendix 1.
