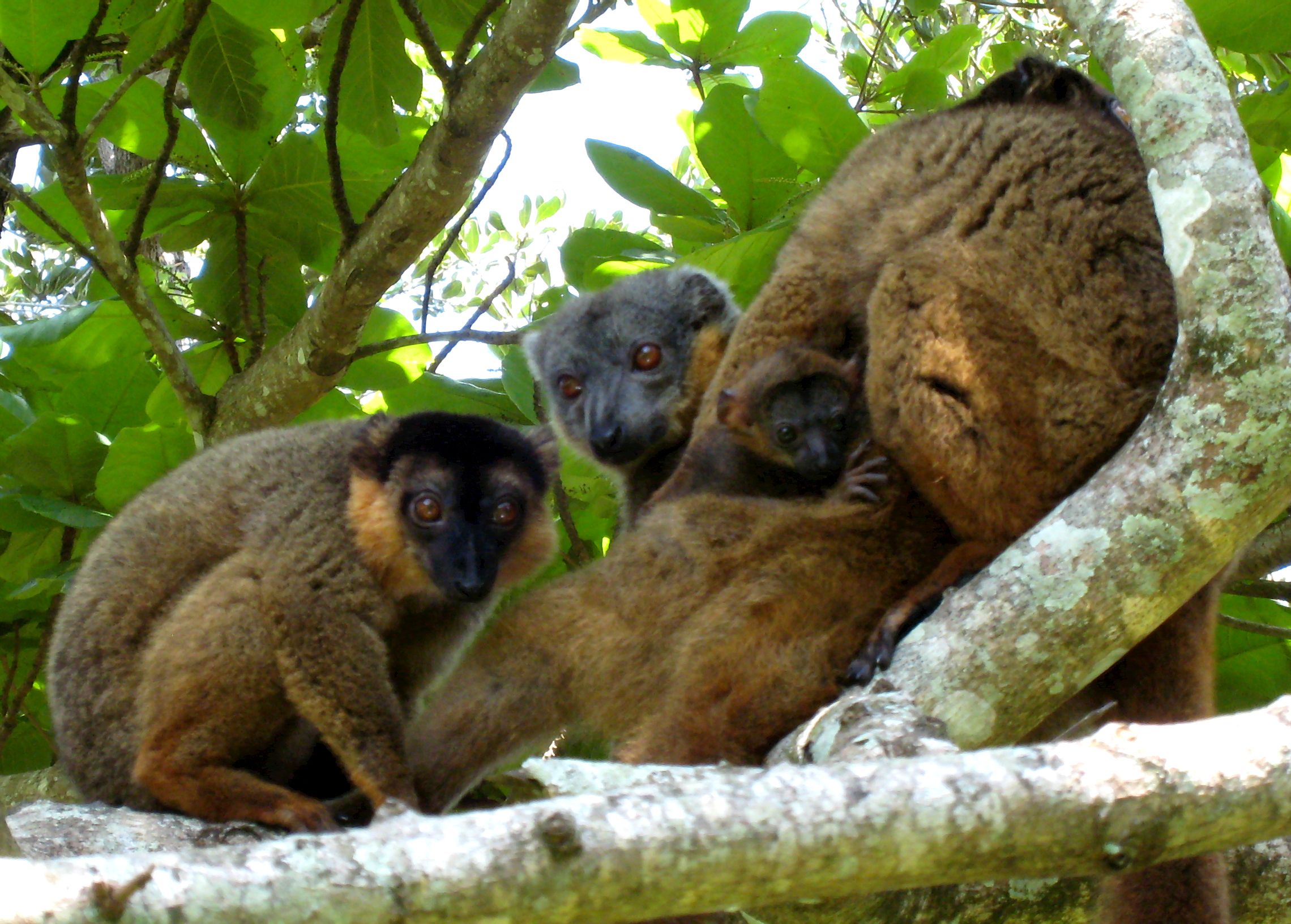
- A group sits huddled on a tree limb, with a juvenile clinging to its mother's abdomen.

Conservation status
- Endangered (IUCN 3.1)
- CITES Appendix I

Scientific classification
- Kingdom: Animalia
- Phylum: Chordata
- Class: Mammalia
- Order: Primates
- Suborder: Strepsirrhini
- Family: Lemuridae
- Genus: Eulemur
- Species: E. collaris

Binomial name
- Eulemur collaris É. Geoffroy, 1812
- Distribution of E. collaris

Synonyms
- melanocephala Gray, 1863; xanthomystax Gray, 1863

= Collared brown lemur =

Species of lemur

The collared brown lemur (Eulemur collaris), also known as the red-collared brown lemur, collared lemur, or red-collared lemur, is a medium-sized strepsirrhine primate and one of twelve species of brown lemur in the family Lemuridae. It is only found in south-eastern Madagascar. Like most species of lemur, it is arboreal, moving quadrupedally and occasionally leaping from tree to tree. Like other brown lemurs, this species is cathemeral (active during the day and the night), lives in social groups, primarily eats fruit, exhibits sexual dichromatism, and does not demonstrate female dominance. The species is listed as Endangered by the International Union for Conservation of Nature (IUCN) and is threatened primarily by habitat loss.

== Taxonomy ==
Together with the twelve other true lemurs (genus Eulemur), the collared brown lemur (E. collaris) is a type of lemur belonging to the family Lemuridae. Collectively, lemurs (infraorder Lemuriformes) are classified as strepsirrhine primates. Originally listed as a subspecies of the common brown lemur (E. fulvus), the collared brown lemur was promoted to full species status in 2001 by biological anthropologist Colin Groves.

== Anatomy and physiology ==
An adult collared brown lemur can reach a head-body length of 39 and 40 cm (15 and 16 in) and have a tail length of 50 and 55 cm (20 and 22 in) for an overall length of 89 and 95 cm (35 and 37 in). It has an average body weight of 2.25 and 2.5 kg (5.0 and 5.5 lb), making it a medium-sized lemur. The only form of sexual dimorphism exhibited by the collared brown lemur is dichromatism. The following table illustrates the coloration differences between the sexes:

Differences in coloration between sexes in the collared brown lemur
	Male	Female
Dorsal coat	Brownish-gray	Browner and more rufous than the male's
Ventral coat	Paler gray	Pale creamy-gray
Tail	Darker gray with a dark stripe along the spine	Same as dorsal coat
Face and head	Muzzle, face, and crown are dark gray to black; creamy to gray-colored eyebrow patches vary between individuals	Gray, with faint gray stripe extending over crown
Cheeks	Creamy to rufous-brown cheeks and beard are thick and bushy	Rufous-brown, but less prominent than the male's
Eyes	orange-red	orange-red

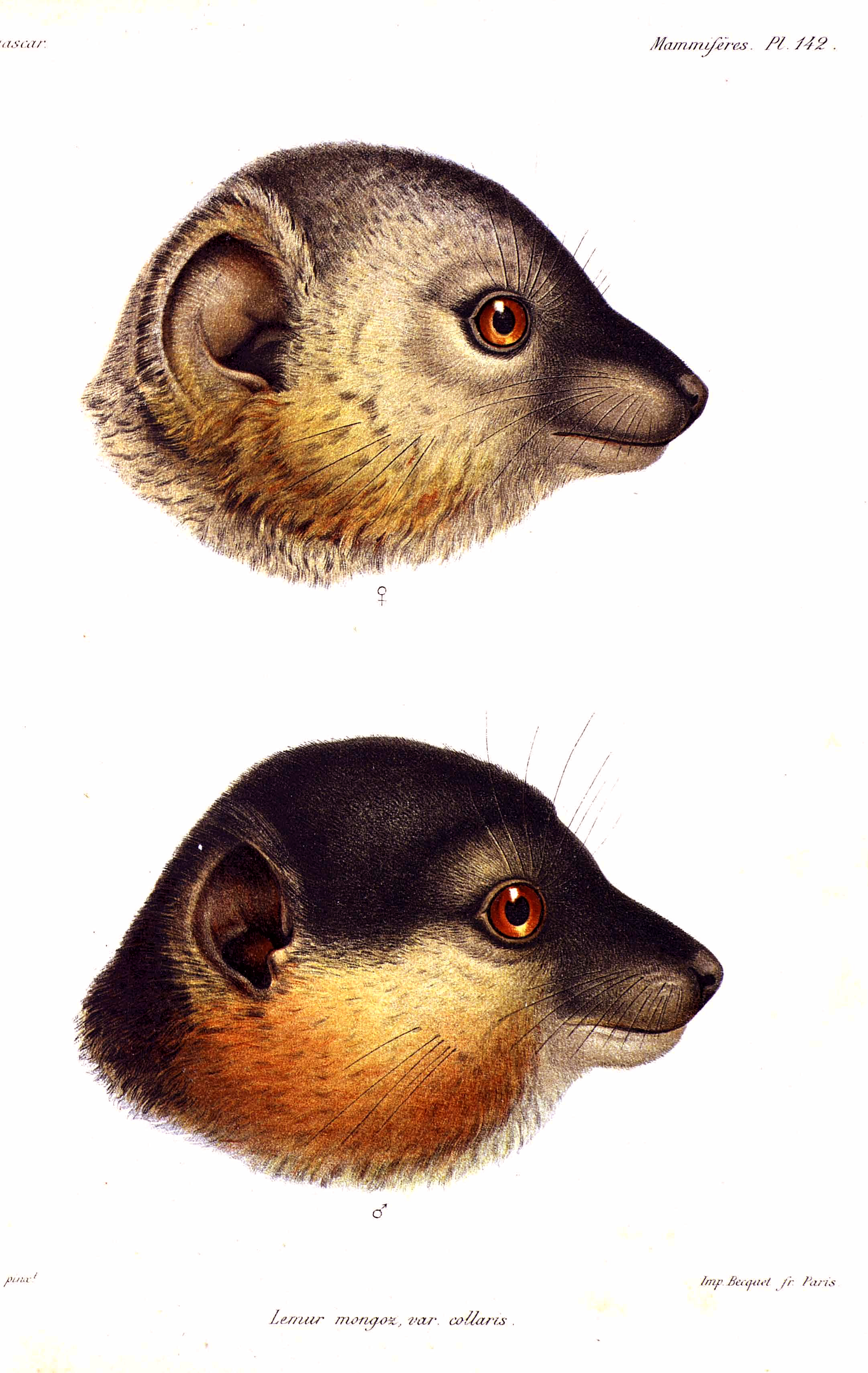
Collared brown lemurs: Female (top) and male (bottom) (Illustration from 1892)

In the wild, the collared brown lemur's range does not overlap with other brown lemurs, so it is rarely confused with other species. However, in captivity it can be easily confused with the gray-headed lemur (Eulemur cinereiceps) due to similar coloration. The male collared brown lemur can be distinguished by their cream-colored or rufous beards, whereas the male gray-headed lemur has a white beard. Females of these two species are nearly indistinguishable, even though genetic analyses support full species status for both taxa. In Berenty Reserve, the species has hybridized with the red lemur.

== Ecology ==
Found in tropical moist lowland and montane forests in southeastern Madagascar, the collared brown lemur occurs west to the forests of Kalambatritra and in the south from Tôlanaro north to the Mananara River. The Mananara River is the boundary between the ranges of the collared brown lemur and the gray-headed lemur to the north. The collared brown lemur can be found in the littoral forests of Mandena Conservation Zone, Sainte Luce Reserve, and Andohahela National Park.

In its environment, the collared brown lemur acts as a seed disperser, and is especially critical for the dispersal of large-seeded fruiting trees within its range. However, there is no evidence that these relationships are coevolutionary and instead these lemurs may be the last remaining seed dispersers for these tree species following the extinction of larger frugivorous birds and subfossil lemurs.

== Behavior ==
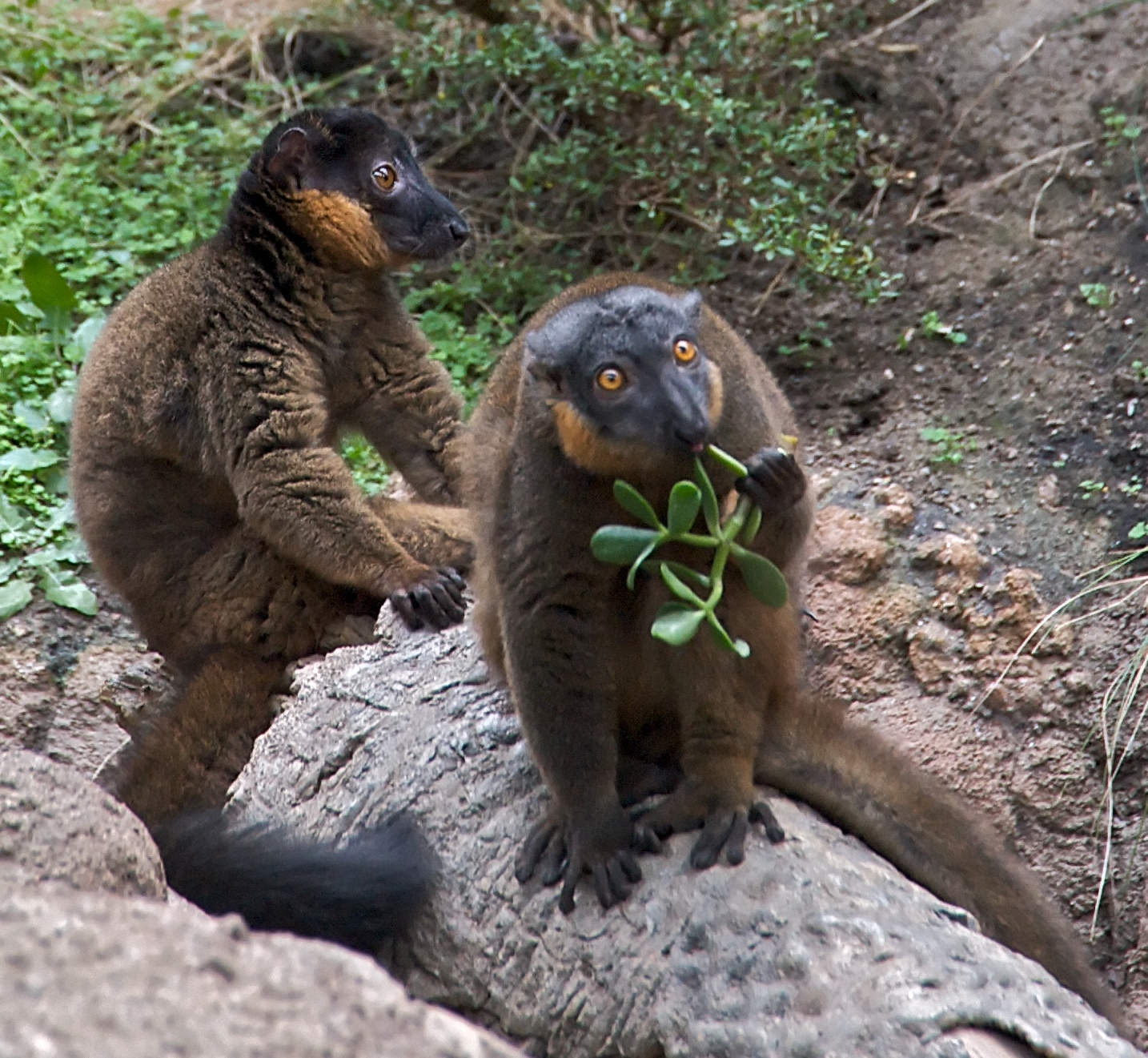

Very little is known about the natural history of this species. It shows great dietary flexibility, feeding on fruits from over 100 plant species. It is also cathemeral (active both day and night throughout the year), a trait seen in some other members of its genus. Research has suggested that metabolic dietary-related needs are the leading factor behind this behavior, although the specific hours of this activity pattern can shift based on lunar luminosity and seasonal changes in the photoperiod (day length). Previous studies had ruled out effects of predators on the expression of this trait, and instead pointed to fruit availability and fiber intake as more important factors.

The collared brown lemur tends to live in social groups that are multi-male/multi-female, with groups ranging in size from two to seventeen individuals. Population densities are estimated at 14 individuals/km^{2}, and it appears to be common within its range. Females give birth to one offspring between October and December, and male involvement with the young has been observed. Female dominance, a common behavioral trait in many lemur species but uncommon in most true lemurs, has not been observed in this species.

Brown lemurs at Berenty (hybrid E. fulvus x collaris) show linear hierarchy, adult female dominance, and the presence of conciliatory behavior after aggressions. Additionally, stress levels (measured via self-directed behaviors) decrease at the increase of the hierarchical position of individuals within the social group and reconciliation is able to bring stress down to the baseline levels.

== Conservation status ==
The collared brown lemur was listed as Endangered in the IUCN Red List assessment. Its greatest threat is habitat loss from slash-and-burn agriculture and charcoal production. It is also hunted for food and captured for the local pet trade. However, populations of the collared brown lemur have been successfully sustained in captivity and continue to provide a safeguard against their extinction.

A small group of collared brown lemurs was introduced in the 1980s into the Berenty Private Reserve and has since hybridized with introduced red-fronted lemurs.
