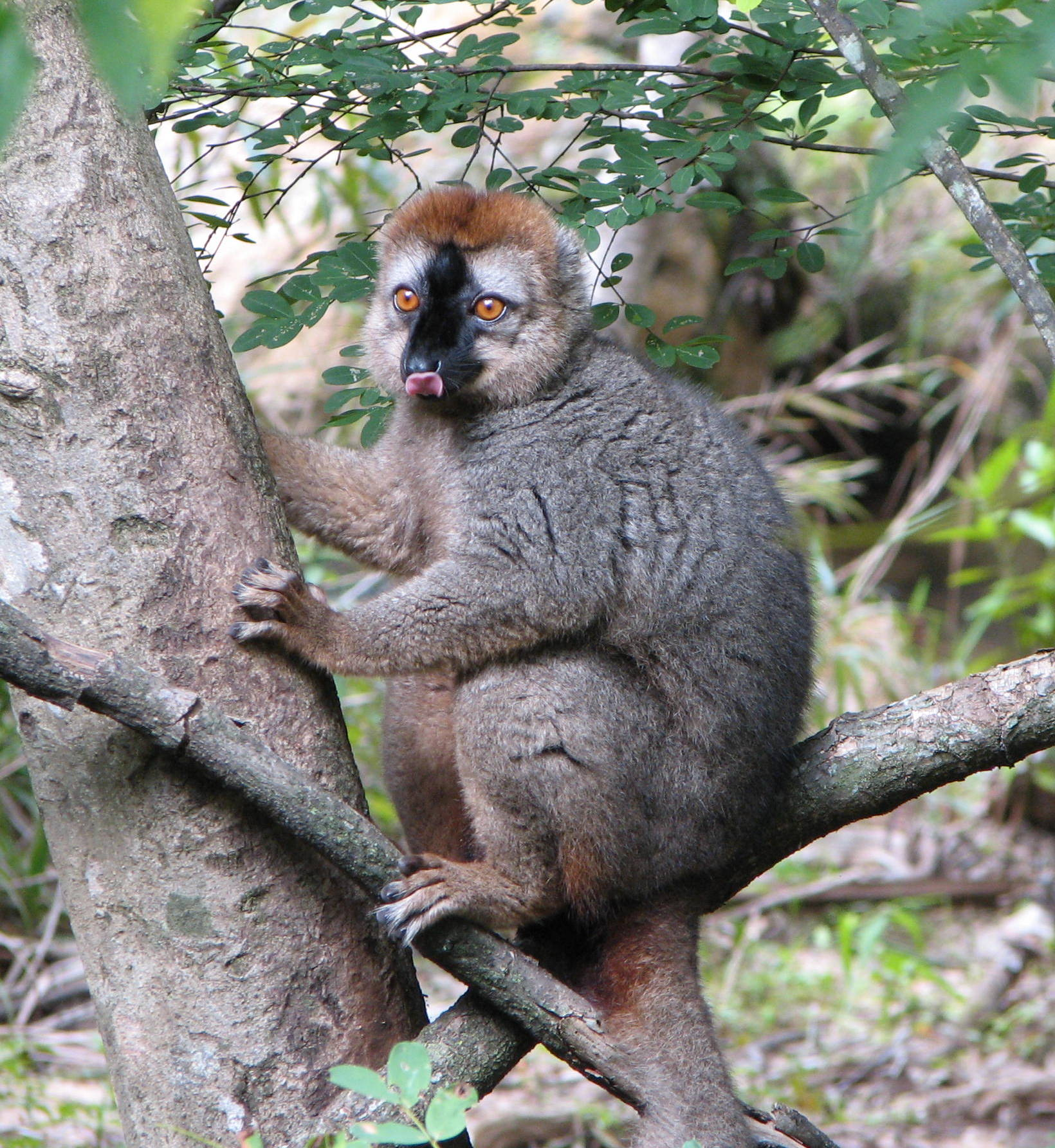

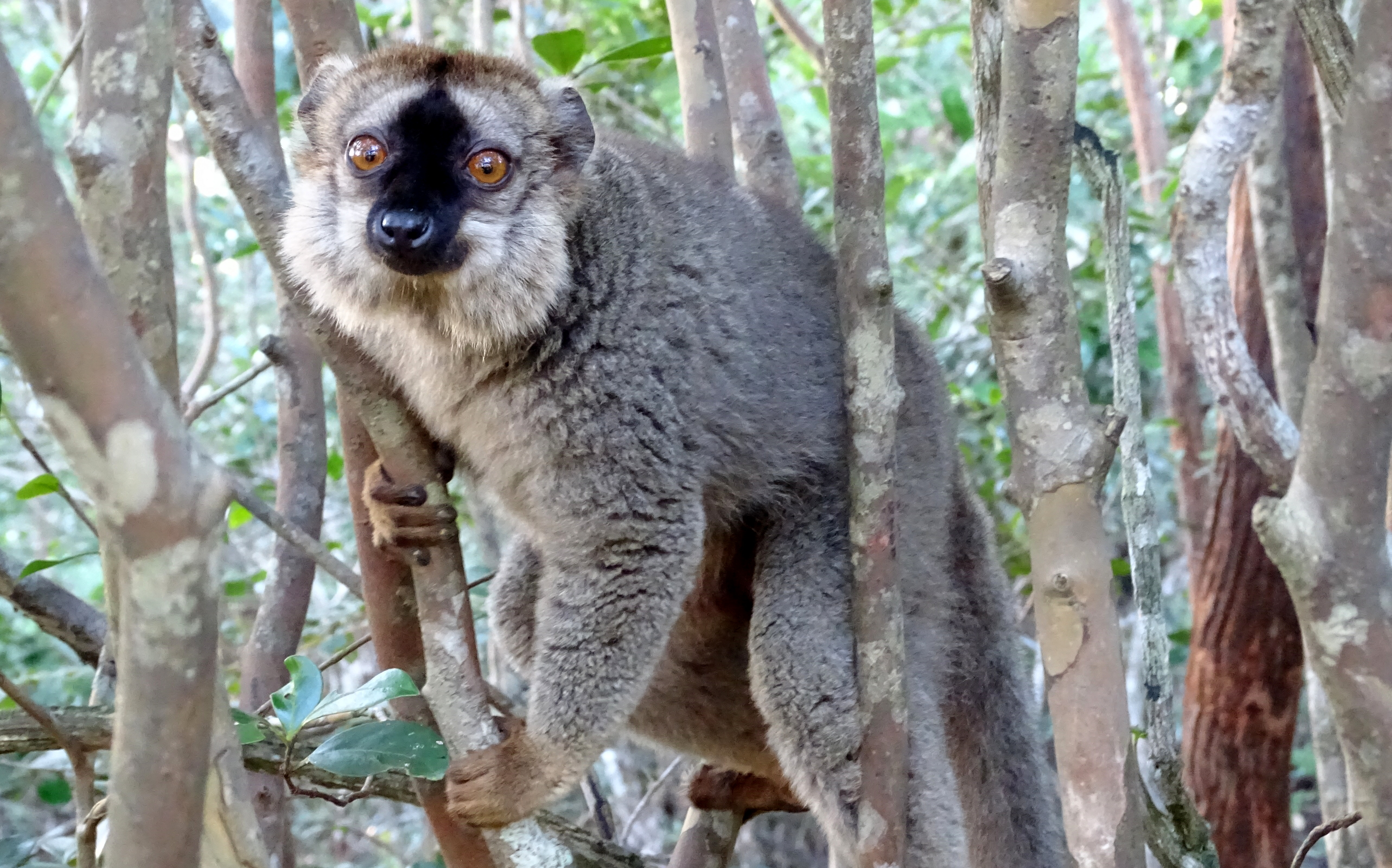

Conservation status
- Vulnerable (IUCN 3.1)
- CITES Appendix I

Scientific classification
- Kingdom: Animalia
- Phylum: Chordata
- Class: Mammalia
- Infraclass: Placentalia
- Order: Primates
- Suborder: Strepsirrhini
- Family: Lemuridae
- Genus: Eulemur
- Species: E. rufifrons

Binomial name
- Eulemur rufifrons Bennett, 1833
- Distribution of E. rufifrons

= Red-fronted lemur =

Species of lemur

The red-fronted lemur (Eulemur rufifrons), also known as the red-fronted brown lemur or southern red-fronted brown lemur, is a species of lemur from Madagascar. Until 2001, it was considered a subspecies of the common brown lemur, E. fulvus. In 2001, E. fulvus was split into several separate species, including Eulemur rufus, in which this species was included. In 2008, E. rufus was split into two species, the red lemur (E. rufus) and the red-fronted lemur (E. rufifrons). E. rufus covers the population on the west coast north of the Tsiribihina River and E. rufifrons covers the population on the west coast south of the Tsiribihina River and the population in eastern Madagascar. The species split was based on genetic and morphological evidence. Mitochondrial DNA analysis indicates that E. rufifrons may be more closely related to the common brown lemur (E. fulvus), white-headed lemur (E. albifrons) and Sanford's brown lemur (E. sanfordi) than it is to E. rufus.

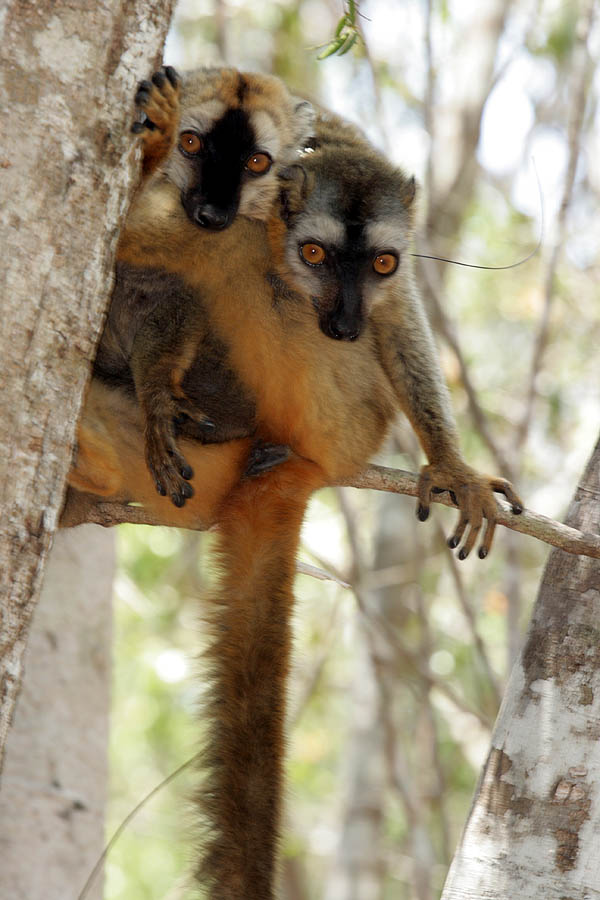
Two individuals from Kirindy

The red-fronted lemur lives on the western coast of Madagascar between the Tsiribihina River to the north and south of the Fiheranana River and in eastern Madagascar from the Mangoro River and Onive River to the Andringitra Massif. It lives in dry lowland forests. It has a head and body length of 35 to 48 centimetres (14 to 19 in) and with a 45 to 55 centimetres (18 to 22 in) tail. Its weight ranges between 2.2 and 2.3 kilograms (4.9 and 5.1 lb). It has a gray coat and black face, muzzle and forehead, plus a black line from the muzzle to the forehead, with white eyebrow patches. It displays sexual dimorphism with the males having white or cream colored cheeks and beards, while females having rufous or cream cheeks and beards that are less bushy than males.

There is considerable geographic variation in the natural history of this species. Western populations tend to have smaller home ranges and higher population densities than eastern populations, although group size tends to be fairly consistent (generally 4–18 animals, averaging 8–9). None of the studied populations show dominance hierarchies and aggression tends to be low.

Diet is diverse, encompassing leaves, seeds, fruit, nectar and flowers, but more so in eastern populations. Western populations tend to rely more on leaves for their diet. Western populations are primarily diurnal, but increase nocturnal activity during the dry season, while eastern populations show less such dichotomy.

Reproduction is seasonal. In western populations one male usually monopolizes all the females in the group, while in eastern populations such monopolization is less typical.
