= True lemur =

- Crowned lemur (E. coronatus) female, NaturZoo Rheine

Conservation status
- CITES Appendix I

Scientific classification
- Kingdom: Animalia
- Phylum: Chordata
- Class: Mammalia
- Order: Primates
- Suborder: Strepsirrhini
- Family: Lemuridae
- Genus: Eulemur; Simons & Rumpler, 1988

Type species
- Eulemur mongoz Linnaeus, 1766

Diversity
- 12 species
- Combined distribution of Eulemur, excluding introductions

Synonyms
- Petterus Groves and Eaglen, 1988

Genus of lemurs

True lemurs, also known as brown lemurs, are the lemurs in genus Eulemur. They are medium-sized primates that live on the islands of Madagascar, the Comoros, and Mayotte.

== Etymology ==
The name Eulemur was coined by Ernst Haeckel in a 1895 list of lemur genera. Because Haeckel did not provide any description for his Eulemur taxon, it was a nomen nudum. Eulemur was later reused by Elwyn LaVerne Simons and Yves Rumpler in 1988, when they removed the true lemurs from Lemur due to the relatedness between the ring-tailed lemur (Lemu catta) with the bamboo lemurs (Hapalemur).

== Taxonomy ==
The recency with which true lemurs divided complicates species definitions, as all 12 extant Eulemur taxa cannot be simultaneously recognized according to models such as the biological and phylogenetic species concepts. For all 12 species to be recognized together, multiple types of evidence must be considered; a unified species concept allows for such interpretations to be made.

The seven species that comprise the fulvus species group within Eulemur diverged from each other recently, possibly during the late Pleistocene. The speciation of the fulvus group likely resulted from genetic drift, rather than ecological pressures. The five species not belonging to the fulvus group similarly form a clade, albeit with a greater amount of morphological variation between the taxa than is seen within the fulvus group.

=== Taxonomic classification ===
12 species comprise the genus Eulemur, of which seven are members of the fulvus species group. A 2023 study speculated that the hybrid population of red-fronted lemurs (E. rufifrons) and gray-headed lemurs (E. cinereiceps) may be a 13th species, and that it possibly represents the only known ongoing homoploid speciation among primates.

- Family Lemuridae
  - Genus Hapalemur: bamboo lemurs
  - Genus Lemur: the ring-tailed lemur
  - Genus Prolemur: the greater bamboo lemur
  - Genus Varecia: ruffed lemurs
  - Genus Eulemur: true lemurs
    - fulvus group
      - White-headed lemur, E. albifrons
      - Gray-headed lemur, E. cinereiceps
      - Collared brown lemur, E. collaris
      - Common brown lemur, E. fulvus
      - Red-fronted lemur, E. rufifrons
      - Red lemur, E. rufus
      - Sanford's brown lemur, E. sanfordi
    - other true lemurs
      - Crowned lemur, E. coronatus
      - Blue-eyed black lemur, E. flavifrons
      - Black lemur, E. macaco
      - Mongoose lemur, E. mongoz
      - Red-bellied lemur, E. rubriventer

=== Hybridization ===
True lemurs can hybridize in both captive and wild settings, and have done so throughout their evolutionary history; persistent gene flow is a feature of the genus. There are five known true lemur hybrid zones in Madagascar: mongoose lemurs (E. mongoz) and red lemurs (E. rufus) in western Madagascar, black lemurs (E. macaco) and blue-eyed black lemurs (E. flavifrons) in the north, white-headed lemurs (E. albifrons) and Sanford's brown lemurs (E. sanfordi) in the northeast, red lemurs (E. rufus) and collared brown lemurs (E. collaris) in the southwest, and red-fronted lemurs and gray-headed lemurs in the southeast. In addition, populations of red-fronted lemurs and collared brown lemurs have been introduced to Berenty Reserve in the extreme south of the island, and have hybridized there. A population with an exceptionally high number of hybrid individuals is found in Andringitra National Park, where gray-headed lemurs regularly hybridize with red-fronted lemurs.

The Mahoran population of common brown lemur (E. fulvus) was considered to be a subspecies named mayottensis, though it was later found by Russell Mittermeier to be a hybrid swarm that probably originated from an ancestral stock of E. fulvus and other members of the fulvus species group.

=== Changes in taxonomy ===
The species that are now considered to be true lemurs were previously members of the genus Lemur, alongside the ring-tailed lemur (Lemur catta). Lemur was first used in Carl Linnaeus' taxonomy, published in the 1758 10th edition of the Systema Naturae, wherein the red slender loris (Lemur [recte Loris] tardigradus), the ring-tailed lemur, and the Philippine colugo (Lemur [recte Cynocephalus] volans) comprised the genus Lemur. The term "lemur" later came to refer exclusively to Malagasy animals, and the genus Lemur grew to include the modern members of Eulemur. Simons and Rumpler removed every species except for L. catta from Lemur in 1988, instead placing them in a new genus, Eulemur. The mongoose lemur was chosen as the type species of the genus.

The first author to describe the mongoose lemur was Mathurin Jacques Brisson in 1762, however his binomial name for the species, Prosimia fusca, was written adjectivally. As such, taxonomic priority belongs to the subsequent Linnaean name mongoz. Henry Ogg Forbes assigned the seven members of the fulvus species group as variants of the mongoose lemur in 1894, although this taxonomy resulted from confusion between the mongoose and common brown lemurs. The Comorian population of mongoose lemur was previously considered to be a separate taxon named albimanus.

The gray-headed lemur was at first considered to be a variant of the mongoose lemur. The species' trivial name was coined by Alfred Grandidier and Alphonse Milne-Edwards in 1875 as Lemur [recte Eulemur] cinereiceps. However, their account was not accompanied by a formal description. Furthermore, their accompanying illustrations were of a female specimen, whereas later specimens were of sexual dichromatic males, obfuscating subsequent descriptions of the species. The gray-headed lemur was obscure in scientific literature until Colin Groves published a description in 1974. Unaware of Groves' description, Rumpler described a male specimen as Lemur albocollaris the following year. The name albocollaris continued to be used for over three decades until a 2008 survey by Steig E. Johnson et al. found that Grandidier and Milne-Edwards' and Rumpler's descriptions referred to different sexes of the same species, thereby assigning taxonomic priority to E. cinereiceps.

Edward Turner Bennett identified a lemur specimen as Lemur [recte Eulemur] rufifrons in the 1833 Proceedings of the Zoological Society of London. This was considered by many subsequent authors to be a taxonomic synonym of what is now regarded as E. rufus, until morphological and genetic differences between then-recognized populations of E. rufus north and south of the Tsiribihina River were identified by Pastorini et al. in 2003. The taxonomic name rufifrons was resurrected to identify the population north of the Tsiribihina.

In his revision of lemur taxonomy, Ernst Schwarz considered the black lemur to be synonymous with the fulvus species group, which was at the time recognized as a single species, Lemur [recte Eulemur] fulvus, with many subspecies. Schwarz's arrangement, which did not take into account the cranial differences between E. fulvus and E. macaco, was later found to be incorrect, as the black lemur exists in discrete, sympatric populations alongside members of the fulvus species complex.

The final extant true lemur taxon to have its subspecies elevated to specific statuses was the black lemur, from which the blue-eyed black lemur was elevated by Mittermeier et al. in 2008. The name flavifrons had been coined by John Edward Gray in 1867, and was sometimes used to refer to macaco individuals that lacked ear tufts prior to the recognition of the E. flavifrons species. The term flavifrons initially referred to a female specimen. This resulted in Philip Sclater naming a male specimen Lemur nigerrimus, which he believed to be a separate species from the female E. flavifrons specimens due to their sexual dichromatism. Another early theory about the relationship between blue-eyed black lemurs and other true lemurs posited that the male was a melanistic variant of a fulvus group member, such as the white-headed lemur. Schwarz likewise believed that females were variants of the collared brown lemur.

== Description ==
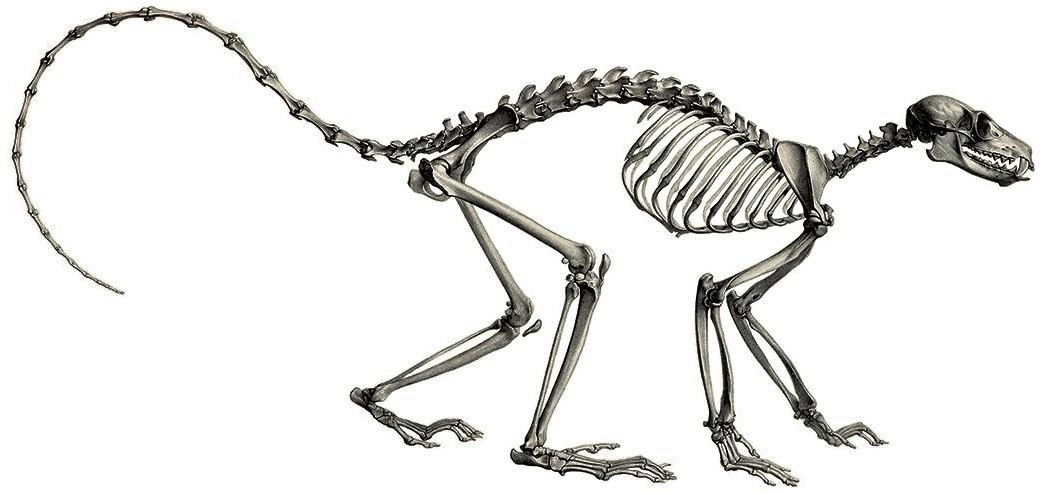
Skeleton of a black lemur (Eulemur macaco)

The true lemurs are medium-sized lemurs that weigh between just under 1 to 2.5 kg (2.2 to 5.5 lb). They are characterized by their elongated muzzles, large eyes, and bushy tails. The cranium exhibits post-orbital constriction, meaning that it becomes narrower immediately behind the orbits before enlarging towards the back of the skull. The respiratory area of the skull is large due to the size of the sinuses. The dental formula is 2.1.3.32.1.3.3 × 2 = 36, meaning that there are four incisors, two canines, three premolars, and three molars in each half of the mouth. The upper incisors (I^{1–2}) are small, peg-like, and do not touch each other or the upper canine (C^{–}). The lower incisors (I_{1–2}) and canine (C_{–}) are flattened and tilted forward. Together, they comprise a structure known as the toothcomb, which forms a bed of mandibular teeth at the front of the mouth. The toothcomb can be used for both social grooming and for acquiring and processing food items. The lower incisors have long crowns, and are positioned close together. The upper and lower incisors do not make contact with each other. The morphology of the lower canine is incisiform, meaning that it is shaped like and fulfills the function of an incisor. To compensate for this, the anterior lower premolar (P_{2}) is large and caniniform. The tip of the lower anterior premolar rests in a pit in the hard palate behind the upper canine while the mouth is closed. A gap separates the anterior lower premolar from its neighboring premolar (P_{3}).

The true lemurs have large secondary tongues known as sublinguae. On the tip of the nose is a moist surface known as a rhinarium, which plays a role in a true lemur's sense of smell. Like in all strepsirrhines, the upper lip is stationary, as it is affixed to the gum. The brain is ovoid, with an enlarged olfactory bulb. The stomach is pear-shaped, and the cecum is conical. The large intestine lacks Peyer's patches. The digital formula of true lemurs is 4>3>5>2>1, with the fourth digit being the longest and the first being the shortest. The fingers and toes are long and slender, and the thumb is widely separated from the rest of the fingers. A true lemur possesses a grooming claw on the second toe, which is an elongated, compressed nail used for hygienic activities such as autogrooming. A patch of specialized hairs is located on the sacral region, which is used as a cushion for sitting. The vertebral formula consists of seven cervicals, 12 thoracics, 6–7 lumbars, three sacrals, and 20–24 caudals.

=== Variation ===
True lemurs exhibit little variation in morphology between species, although species found in the west tend to be smaller and of lighter colorations than those in endemic to the east of the island. With the exception of the common brown lemur, the true lemurs exhibit sexual dichromatism, whereby males and females have different pelage colorations. Pelage differences between species are greater among males than in females.

White-headed lemur (Eulemur albifrons) male (left) and females (center, right)

The white-headed lemur has a head-body length of 39–42 centimeters (15–17 in), a tail length of 50–54 cm (20–21 in), and an average body weight of 1 kilogram (2.2 lb). Males are identifiable by their dark brown dorsal coats and tails, pale gray ventral pelages, and black muzzle with a white beard, crown, and cheeks. The ears are almost covered by white fur. Males exhibit two different morphs, one with a white forehead and one without. In lieu of a white framing to the face, females have gray fur on the face and muzzle. Female white-headed lemurs closely resemble female Sanford's brown lemurs. The white-headed lemur has a somatic number of 2n = 60, with four submetacentric autosomal chromosomes, and 54 acrocentric autosomal and two acrocentric sex chromosomes.

The gray-headed lemur has a head-body length of 39–40 cm (15–16 in), a tail length of 50–55 cm (20–22 in), and a body weight ranging between 1.9 and 2.0 kg (4.2 and 4.4 lb). Males are endowed with a white or cream-colored bushy beard, while females possess a shorter, red-brown beard that matches the color of the coat. The crown and muzzle of the female is slate gray, whereas the male possesses a dark gray crown with a black muzzle. The somatic number of the gray-headed lemur is 2n = 48, with six metacentric chromosomes, ten submetacentric chromosomes, 30 acrocentric autosomal chromosomes, and two acrocentric sex chromosomes.

The collared brown lemur is 39–40 cm (15–16 in) long, notwithstanding a 50–55 cm (20–22 in) tail, and weighs 2.1 kg (4.6 lb) on average. It resembles the gray-headed lemur, albeit the face is generally darker and the male beard is a creamy red-brown, rather than white. The amount of dark coloring on the head varies between individuals. This resulted in Gray erroneously describing specimens with the darkest head colorations as Lemur melanocephalus in 1863. The collared brown lemur exhibits genetic polymorphism, whereby three karyotypes are known: 2n = 50, 51, and 52. 2n = 52 consists of six or eight metacentric autosomal chromosomes, four submetacentric autosomal chromosomes, and 40 or 38 acrocentric autosomal chromosomes, alongside two acrocentric sex chromosomes. 2n = 50 also has four submetacentric autosomal chromosomes and two acrocentric sex chromosomes, although it differs from 2n = 52 in that it has ten metacentric and 34 acrocentric autosomal chromosomes. 2n = 50 may have arisen from 2n = 52 as a result of centric fusion. 2n = 51 may be the result of hybridization between 2n = 50 and 52.

Crowned lemur (Eulemur coronatus) female (left) and male (right)

The crowned lemur is among the smallest Eulemur species, being 34–36 cm (13–14 in) long with a 41–49 cm (16–19 in) tail, and weighing between 1.1 and 1.3 kg (2.4 and 2.9 lb). Males have gray-brown backs with chestnut-brown flanks and limbs. Ventrally, they are creamy-gray. Among males, an orange V-shaped "crown" mark connects the ears to the eyebrows, and descends either side of the cheeks. Females are generally grayer, and have less prominent "crown" patterns that do not descend to the cheeks. The somatic number of E. coronatus is 2n = 46. It has six metacentric chromosomes, 12 submetacentric chromosomes, 26 acrocentric autosomal chromosomes, and two acrocentric sex chromosomes.

The blue-eyed black lemur has a head-body length of 39–45 cm (15–18 in), a tail length of 51–65 cm (20–26 in), and a weight of 1.8–1.9 kg (4.0–4.2 lb). Males are wholly dark, though the hairs are sometimes tinged with brown shades, and a ridge crest of hair is present atop the forehead. Females have red-tan or red-gray backs, with a creamy-white or gray ventrum, and a slate-gray muzzle. Females can be differentiated from the closely related black lemur females by being generally lighter-colored. The blue-eyed black lemur is the only primate species that consistently exhibits blue eyes.

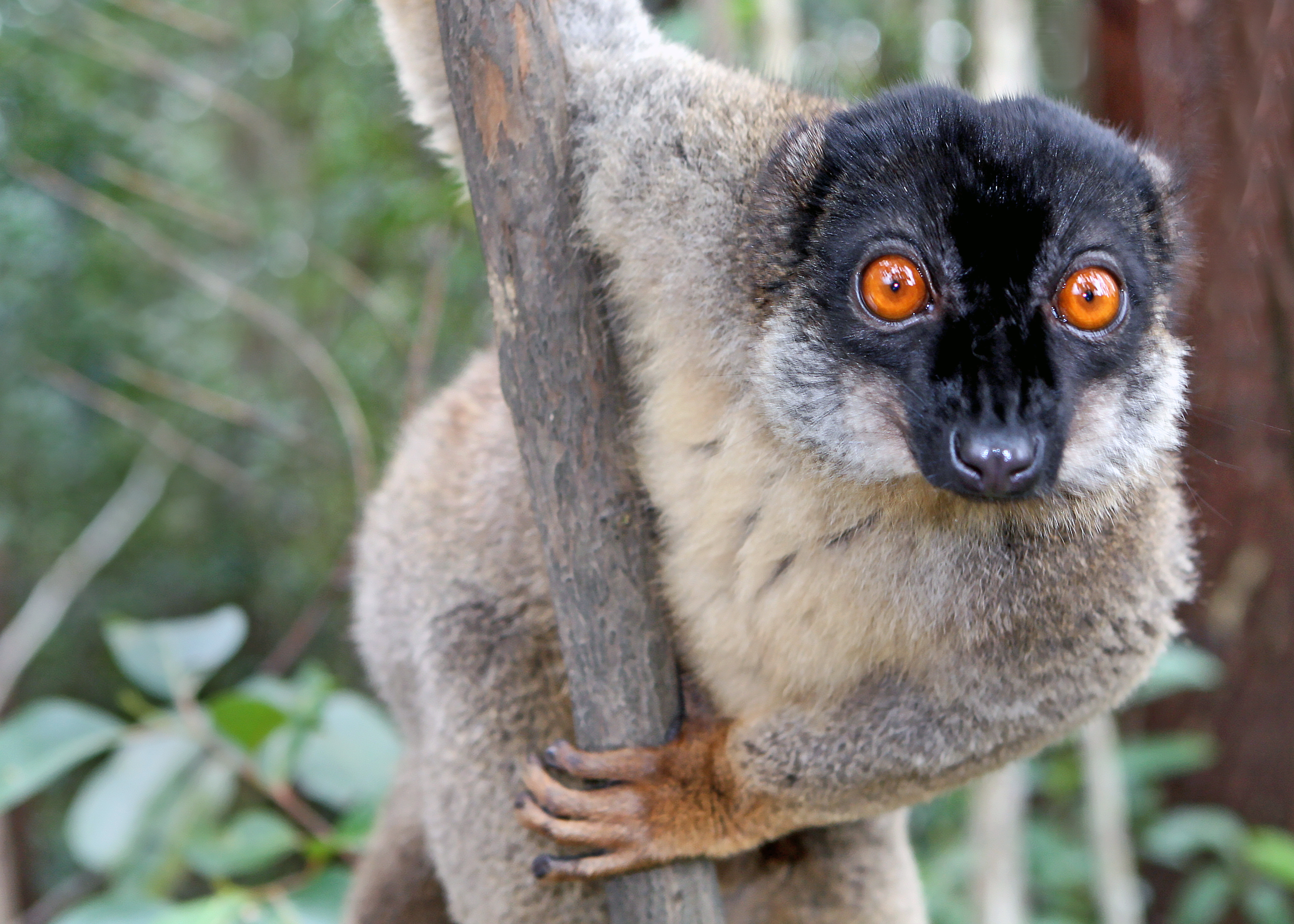
Some common brown lemurs (Eulemur fulvus) have white patches above their eyes; others do not.

The common brown lemur has a head-body length of 40–18 cm (15.7–7.1 in), a tail length of 45–55 cm (18–22 in), and weighs about 1 kilogram (2.2 lb). Though females are slightly lighter than males, the species exhibits generally similar pelage colorations between males and females, and is the only Eulemur species to do so. Females appear to have slightly sharper faces than males, due to differences in fur arrangement. Its coat is gray-brown on the back. Above a light-colored beard, the head is dark. The tail darkens towards the tip. Individuals from the north of the species' range possess pale patches above the eyes, while those found elsewhere do not. The common brown lemur has a somatic number of 2n = 60, featuring four submetacentric chromosomes and 54 acrocentric autosomal chromosomes, as well as two acrocentric sex chromosomes.

The black lemur is medium-sized, being 39–45 cm (15–18 in) long with a 51–65 cm (20–26 in) tail, and weighing about 1.9 kg (4.2 lb). Like the blue-eyed black lemur, males of this species are darkly colored, ranging from chocolate-brown to black. Among females, the dorsal coat can be golden-brown or chestnut-brown, with a white or gray abdomen, beard, and ear tufts. The face is black. Both sexes have prominent ear tufts that descend to the neck, framing the face. The somatic number of the black lemur is 2n = 44, wherein 12 autosomal chromosomes are metacentric, eight are submetacentric, and 22 autosomal chromosomes and the sex chromosomes are acrocentric.

The mongoose lemur is one of the smaller true lemurs, as it is 30–35 cm (12–14 in) long with a 45–48 cm (18–19 in) tail, and can weigh between 1.1 and 1.3 kg (2.4 and 2.9 lb). Males have a gray-brown back with a dark patch on the rump and rusty-brown neck and shoulders. They are distinguished by a rufous beard. Females are lighter than males, and have a cream-colored abdomen. Females also have darker faces with white beards that connect the ears to the throat and forelimbs. Two pairs of mammae are present, although only one is functional. Males sometimes have bald spots on the tops of their heads from rubbing during scent-marking behaviors. The fur is dense, especially so among higher-altitude populations such as those on the island of Anjouan. Mongoose lemurs of the Comoros sometimes exhibit pelage variations that differentiate them from Malagasy mongoose lemurs, although these differences are not consistent among all individuals in the Comorian populations. The mongoose lemur has a somatic number of 2n = 60, wherein four autosomal chromosomes are submetacentric, and 54 autosomal chromosomes and the sex chromosomes are acrocentric.

Red-bellied lemur (Eulemur rubriventer) female (left) and male (right).

The red-bellied lemur is a medium-sized true lemur, with a head-body length of 35–40 cm (14–16 in), a tail length of 43–53 cm (17–21 in), and a weight of 1.9–2.1 kg (4.2–4.6 lb). Both sexes possess a dorsal coat of long, chestnut-brown fur. Males have a reddish ventral coat, whereas females' are creamy-white. The face has white teardrop-shaped marks on the skin below the eyes, which are larger in males and smaller in females. The red-bellied lemur does not exhibit a beard or ear tufts such as those seen in other true lemurs. Instead, the males have patches of dense fur around the ears and cheeks that make the face appear robust. Like the mongoose lemur, males sometimes have bald spots on their heads as a result of repeated rubbing while scent-marking. The red-bellied lemur has a somatic number of 2n = 50. It has two metacentric chromosomes, 12 submetacentric chromosomes, and 34 acrocentric autosomal chromosomes. The sex chromosomes are acrocentric.

The red-fronted lemur is one of the larger species of Eulemur, being 40–48 cm (16–19 in) long with a 45–55 cm (18–22 in) tail, and weighing about 2.1 kg (4.6 lb) on average. Males have iron-gray backs with paler gray ventral coats, whereas females are olive-gray on the back with pale red undersides. Infants of both sexes are born with pelages resembling those of adult males, with females adopting their sex-specific colorations at 7–17 weeks of age. Despite its resemblance to the red lemur, the red-fronted lemur is more closely related to the white-headed lemur, common brown lemur, and Sanford's brown lemur.

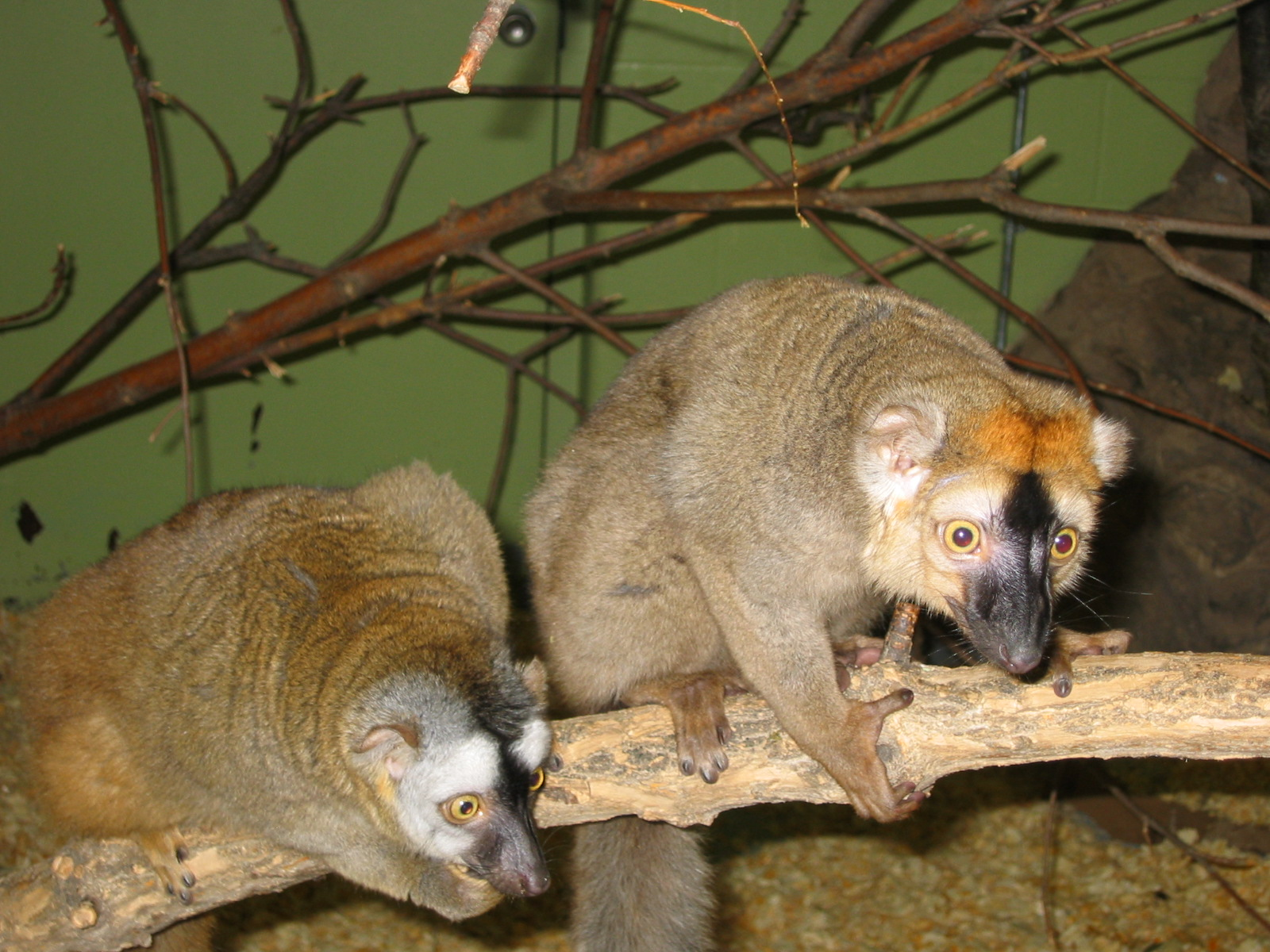
Red lemur (Eulemur rufus) female (left) and male (right)

The red lemur has a head-body length of 40–48 cm (16–19 in), a tail length of 45–55 cm (18–22 in), and an average body weight of about 1.6 kg (3.5 lb). Males are generally olive-gray with a brick-red crown and a golden-red cheek beard. A vertical black stripe connects the crown to the nose. Females are reddish with orange undersides and golden-red beards. Both sexes have white markings above the eyes. The red lemur has a somatic number of 2n = 60, with four submetacentric autosomal chromosomes, 54 acrocentric autosomal chromosomes, and two acrocentric sex chromosomes.

Sanford's brown lemur is medium-sized, with a head-body length of 38–40 cm (15–16 in), a tail length of 50–55 cm (20–22 in), and a body weight ranging between 1.8 and 1.9 kg (4.0 and 4.2 lb). The backs of males are brown, connecting to darkly-colored tails. Ventrally, a male is pale brownish-gray. Males are notable for their ear tufts, which can be off-white to rusty in coloration, as is the case with the large male beard beneath the face. Together, the beard and ear tufts appear as a mane wreathing the male Sanford brown lemur's dark face. Females are gray-brown on the back and on the tail, while they are pale gray on the front. They have light patches above the eyes, and lack the beard and mane of the males. Female Sanford's brown lemurs closely resemble the females of E. albifrons. The somatic number of Sanford's brown lemur is 2n = 60, featuring four submetacentric chromosomes, 54 acrocentric autosomal chromosomes, and two acrocentric sex chromosomes.

== Behavior ==
True lemurs are cathemeral, as they can be active during day or night, although the degree to which they practice cathemerality varies. They typically locomote quadrupedally, although they will adopt a semi-upright position when traveling arboreally. While seated, they apply their body weight to the specialized hairs of their pygal patch and the spiny processes of the sacral vertebrae. While eating, true lemurs consume food using their cheek teeth, as the frontal teeth are only used for social grooming.

=== Social groups ===
True lemurs can be socially monogamous (as is the case with the mongoose and red-bellied lemurs) or can exist in multimale-multifemale groups of up to 20 members (as with the other ten species). Eulemur is among the few primate genera that exhibit both monogamous and group-living modes of social organization. Social monogamy in the mongoose and red-bellied lemurs likely evolved from an ancestral group-living behavior. Intrasexual competition among female true lemurs may have favored small group sizes, which was exacerbated by competition with sympatric congeners among the ancestors of the two socially monogamous true lemur species; only two group-living true lemur species, the crowned lemur and Sanford's brown lemur, are sympatric with other members of Eulemur. Conversely, the two socially monogamous species live sympatrically with other true lemurs on Madagascar. Eulemur may be an exceptional taxon in this regard; a 2013 study found that the evolutionary transition from group living to social monogamy did not occur any other mammal genus.

The mongoose lemur population found on the Comorian island of Mohéli deviates from the species' typically monogamous social organization, as groups of up to seven individuals in size have been observed. This phenomenon may be due to a lack of interspecific competition with other true lemurs, such as that which is faced by the Malagasy populations of E. mongoz.

=== Diet ===
True lemurs are typically frugivorous, maintaining diets that prioritize the consumption of fruit food items. The quantity of fruit consumed relative to other food items varies between seasons. True lemurs that live in dry forests typically consume a smaller amount of food species as opposed to the dietary diversity exhibited by rainforest species. The most frugivorous of the true lemurs are the E. rufifrons/E. cinereiceps hybrids, whose diets are composed of 95% fruit, compared to the 66% fruit diets of their parent species. Overall, true lemurs maintain relatively diverse diets. In captivity, meat is more readily consumed if it has been cooked.

=== Reproduction ===
Female true lemurs are seasonal breeders, typically being receptive to copulation only during a yearly mating season that lasts from two to six weeks. However, this regularity may be disrupted in individuals living in anthropogenically degraded forest habitats, resulting in out-of-season reproductions and consequently higher rates of infant mortality. The gestation period is about 120 days in length. Infants are born with blue irises, and are carried on their mothers' abdomens. Weaning occurs at six or seven months of age. Females engage in alloparental care, as they will exchange infants between each other for nursing. Among the group-living Eulemur species, there is a significant reproductive bias in favor of socially dominant males; a 2015 study of red-fronted lemurs found that the highest-ranking males were six times more likely to sire offspring than subordinates.

== Ecology ==
True lemurs are highly adaptable, and can be found in most of the biogeographic regions of Madagascar. They occur in almost every forest of the island, with the exception of the spiny forests of the far south.

=== Distribution ===
The seven members of the fulvus group have an allopatric distribution, whereas they may live in sympatry with non-fulvus members of Eulemur.

Eulemur distribution

Range of the fulvus group: red = E. fulvus, green = E. collaris,
purple = E. rufus, orange = E. cinereiceps,
blue = E. rufifrons, yellow = E. albifrons,
brown = E. sanfordi

Range of the other Eulemur: red = E. rubriventer, green = E. mongoz,
purple = E. coronatus, orange = E. flavifrons,
blue = E. macaco

Anthropogenic habitat modification has played an important role in shaping present distributions of true lemur species, and has especially reduced the ranges of E. collaris, E. flavifrons, E. fulvus, E. rufifrons, and E. sanfordi.

=== Predation ===
True lemurs are especially vulnerable to predation by the fossa (Cryptoprocta ferox) and birds of prey.

== Conservation status ==
Although Eulemur species are adaptable to many different habitats, they are nevertheless threatened by deforestation and habitat fragmentation. Habitat degradation harms true lemurs in many ways, such as having negative effects on hormonal levels and prompting dangerous out-of-season reproductions. True lemurs are widely hunted in Madagascar, and often appear in the illicit trade of exotic pets. Close proximity to human settlements may increase the likelihood of true lemurs being hunted. Furthermore, hunting has intensified in recent years. Pathogen transfer between human and lemur populations living in close proximity may also be a harmful consequence of habitat encroachment by human settlements.

Ecological niche modeling has found that E. cinereiceps is more resilient to the negative effects of anthropogenic habitat disturbance than other true lemur species.
