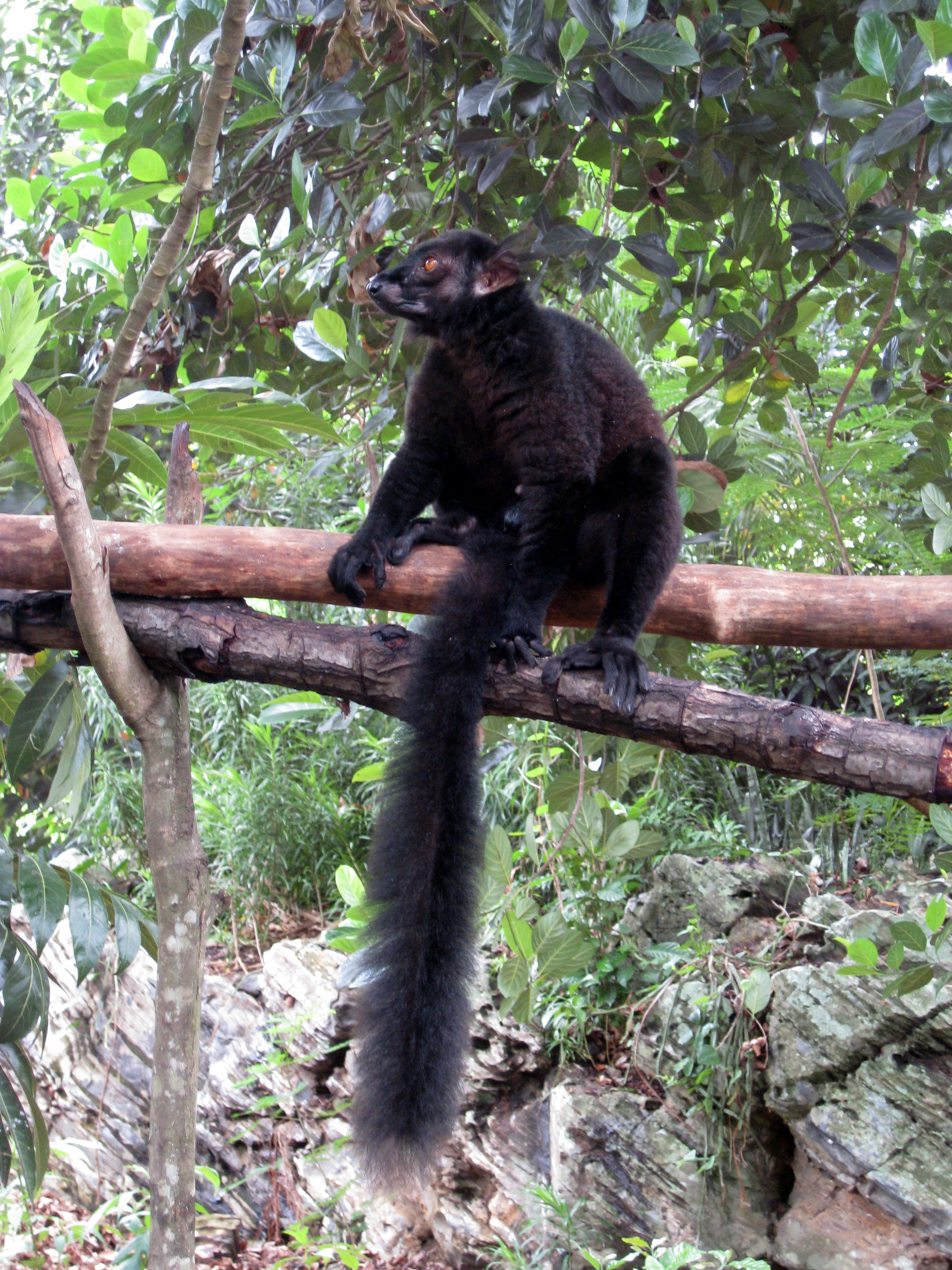
- Male
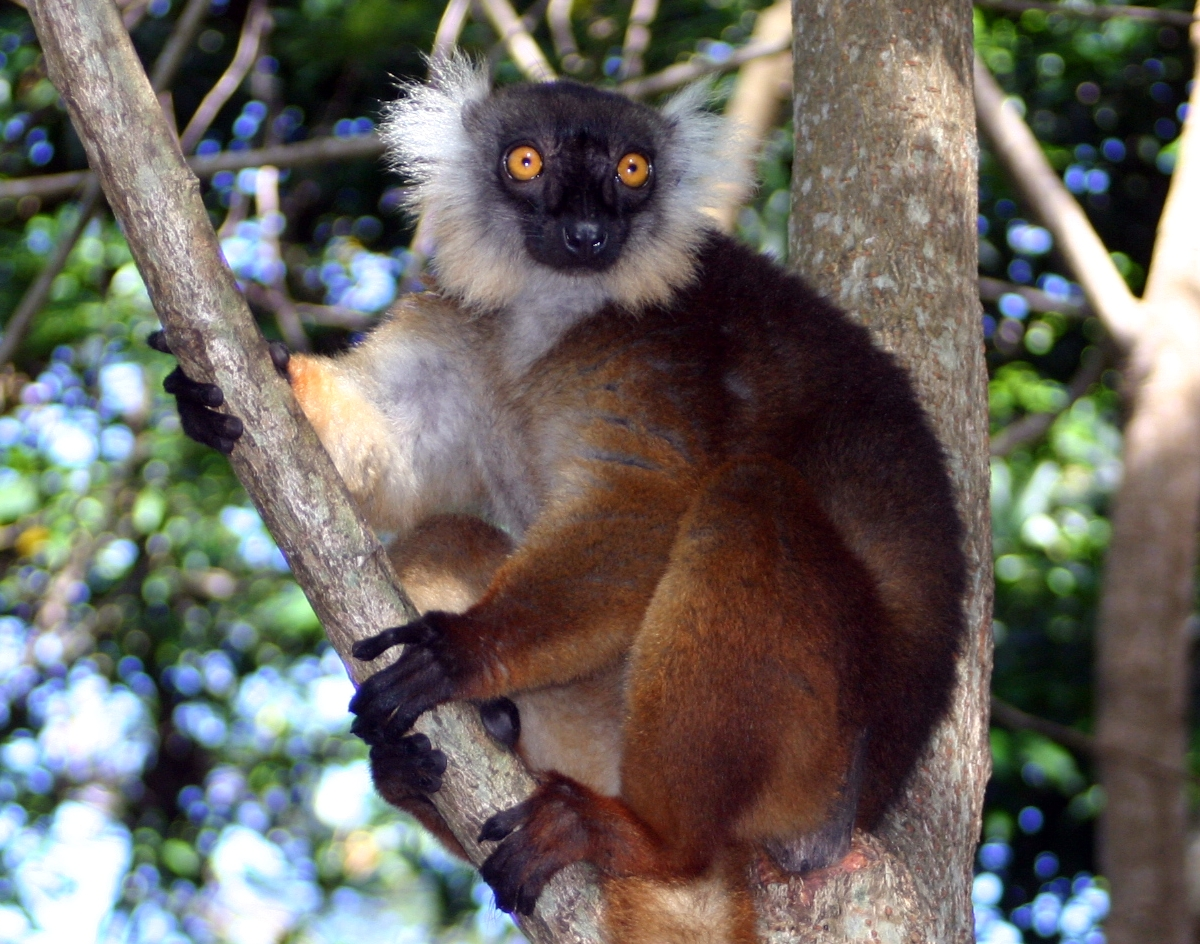
- Female

Conservation status
- Endangered (IUCN 3.1)
- CITES Appendix I

Scientific classification
- Kingdom: Animalia
- Phylum: Chordata
- Class: Mammalia
- Infraclass: Placentalia
- Order: Primates
- Suborder: Strepsirrhini
- Family: Lemuridae
- Genus: Eulemur
- Species: E. macaco

Binomial name
- Eulemur macaco (Linnaeus, 1766)
- Distribution of E. macaco

Synonyms
- Lemur leucomystax Bartlett, 1863; Lemur macaco Linnaeus, 1766; Lemur macaco niger Schreber, 1775

= Black lemur =

Species of lemur

The black lemur (Eulemur macaco) is a species of lemur from the family Lemuridae. Like all lemurs, it is endemic to Madagascar. Originally, the species was thought to have two subspecies, Eulemur macaco macaco and Eulemur macaco flavifrons, both of which were elevated to species status by Mittermeier et al. in 2008 to Eulemur macaco and Eulemur flavifrons respectively. The most startling difference between the two species is the eye colour; Eulemur flavifrons, the blue-eyed black lemur, has blue eyes, while Eulemur macaco, the black lemur, has brown or orange eyes, and also has ear tufts.

Both species live in northwest Madagascar. The black lemur occurs in moist forests in the Sambirano region of Madagascar and on nearby islands. The blue-eyed black lemur is restricted to the Sahamalaza Peninsula and adjacent forests. There are reports of the two species hybridizing where their ranges overlap in Manongarivo Special Reserve.

== Physical description ==
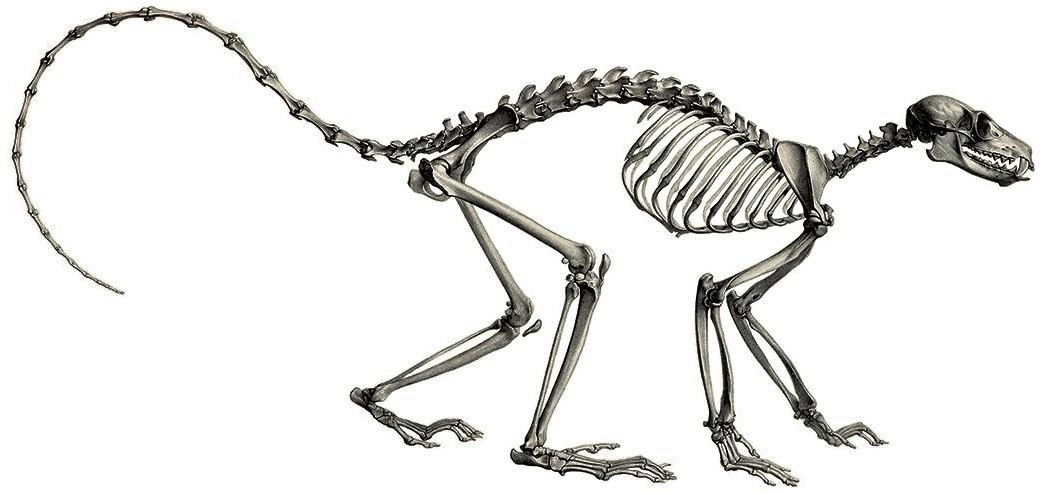
Skeleton

The black lemur is between 90 and 110 centimeters in length, of which 51–65 centimeters are tail. Weight typically ranges between 1.8 and 2.0 kilograms. The black lemur displays sexual dimorphism in coloration. Males have black or dark chocolate fur, while females' fur is of a lighter brown color, generally medium brown, chestnut brown or even orange-brown. Males have large black ear tufts, while females have large white ear tufts.

The only other Eulemur species that occurs within the range of the black lemur is the common brown lemur, which overlaps with the black lemur at the extreme southern and eastern edge of its range, and the red-bellied lemur, on the Tsaratanana Massif. The common brown lemur and the red-bellied lemur have different coloration and do not show the extreme sexual dimorphism of the black lemur, making confusion between the black lemur and the other species unlikely.

== Diet ==
Male, brown-eyed, Black lemur eating, at Nosy Komba

The black lemur primarily eats fruit, which makes up an estimated 78% of its diet. The ripeness of this fruit is vital to the lemur's diet. Other foods eaten include flowers, leaves, fungi, some invertebrates and, especially during the dry season, nectar.

== Behaviour ==
The black lemur lives in both primary and secondary forest. It is active both during the day and at night. It forages in both the upper and middle canopy, especially at night, and during the day it also forages in the understory. In degraded habitats, it also forages on the ground and may even eat soil.

The black lemur lives in groups of 2 to 15 members, including approximately equal numbers of males and females. Average group size is about 10 members, although the average may be smaller for E. m. flavifrons. Females are dominant over males, although intragroup fighting is rare.

Groups have home ranges of about 3.5 to 7 hectares. Ranges overlap considerably, and population density can reach 200 individuals per square kilometer.

Black lemurs also have a habit of picking up and biting at toxic millipedes. The toxins are usually not fatal to the lemurs and they try to stimulate the millipede to release its toxins in self-defence. Once this is achieved the black lemur will rub the millipede around its body to get the toxins on its fur. It is believed that they do this to help repel insects with the millipedes poison, though the toxins also appear to have pleasurable psychoactive effects on the lemurs.

=== Reproduction ===
Mating usually takes place in April and May. During mating season, antagonism between males increases, and males sometimes roam between groups. After a gestation of about 125 days, a single infant is usually born between late August and early October. Females typically give birth for the first time at two years of age.

== Gallery ==
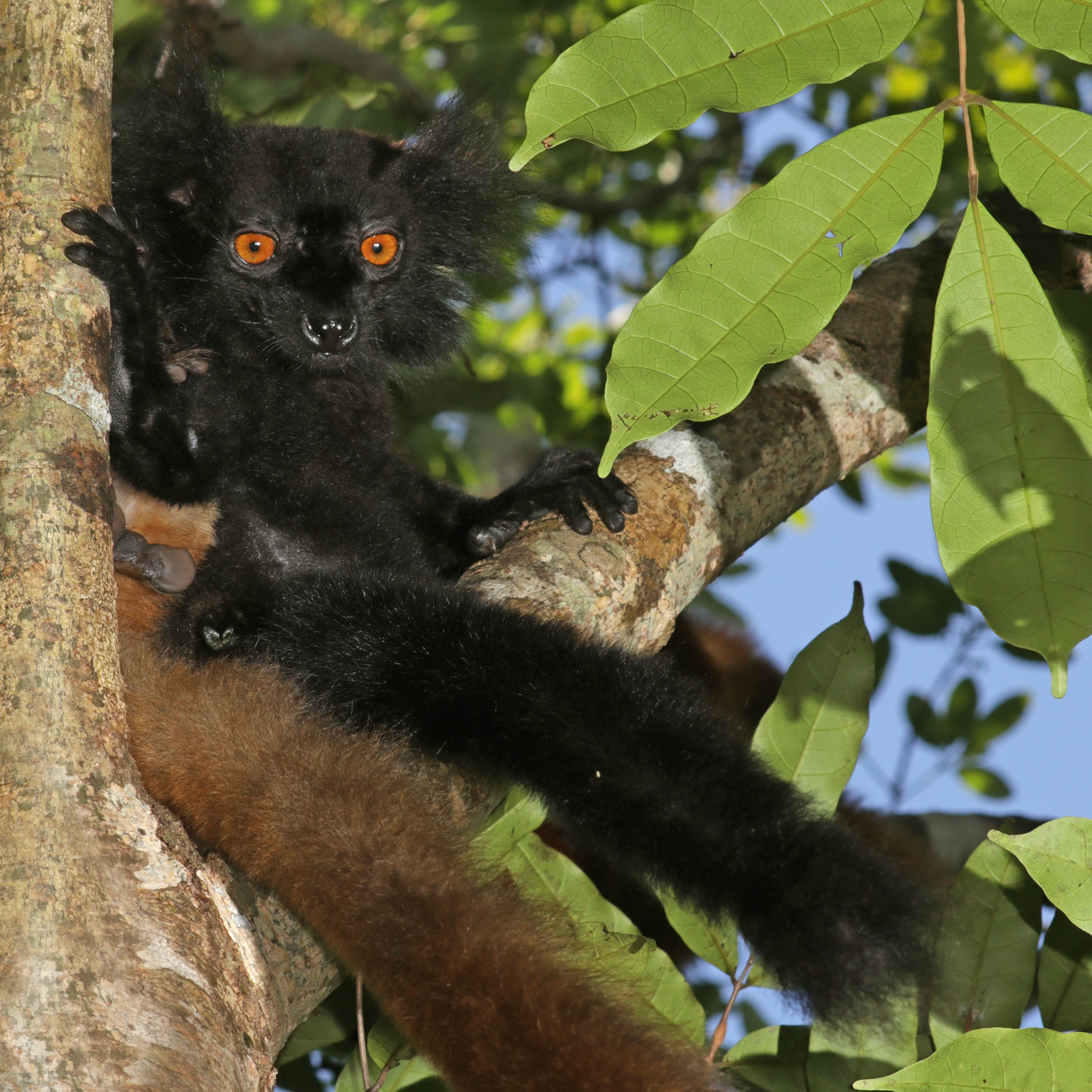
Male black lemur at Lokobe Strict Reserve, Nosy Be

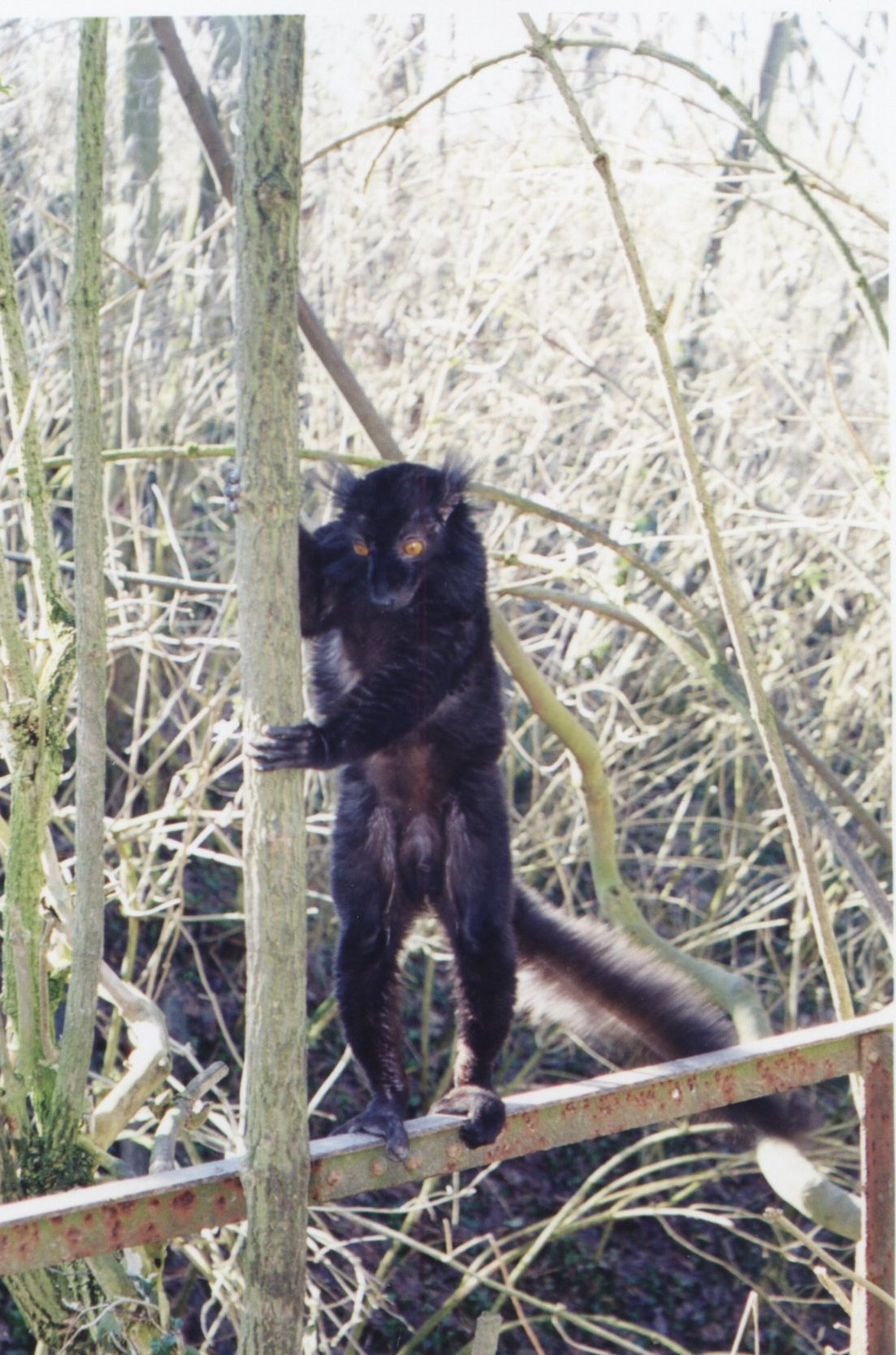
Male black lemur

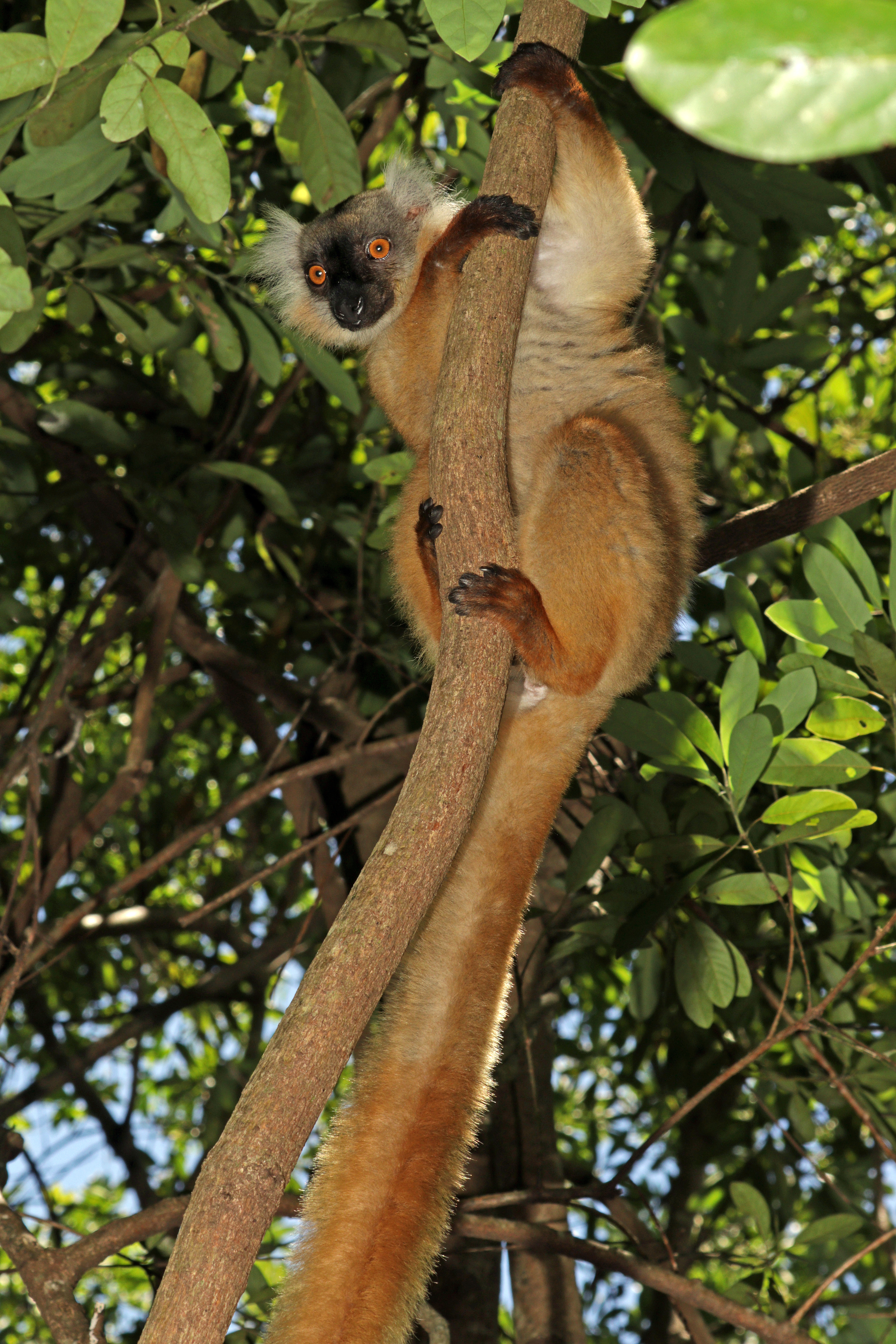
Female black lemur at Lokobe Strict Reserve, Nosy Be

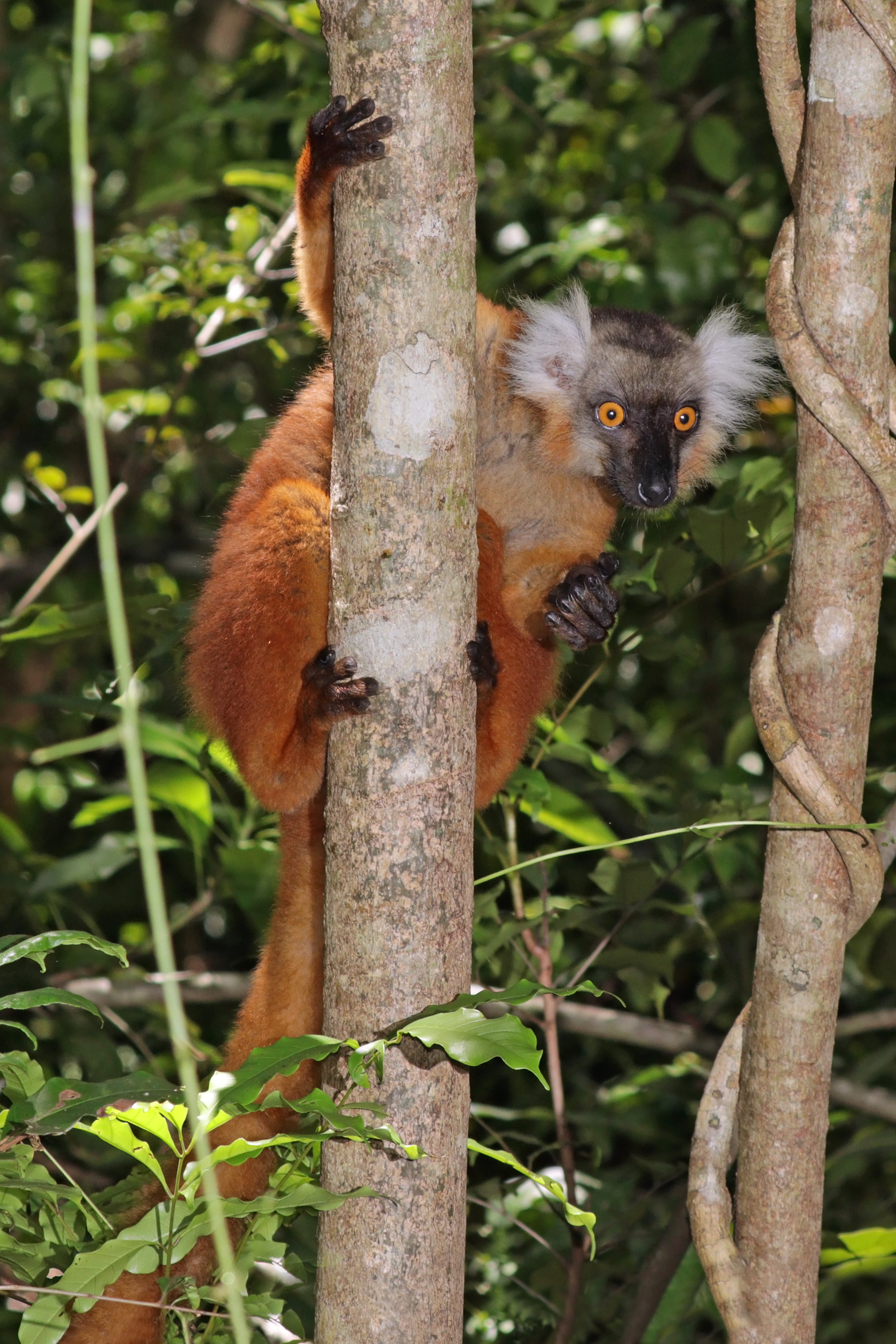
Female black lemur at Lokobe Strict Reserve, Nosy Be

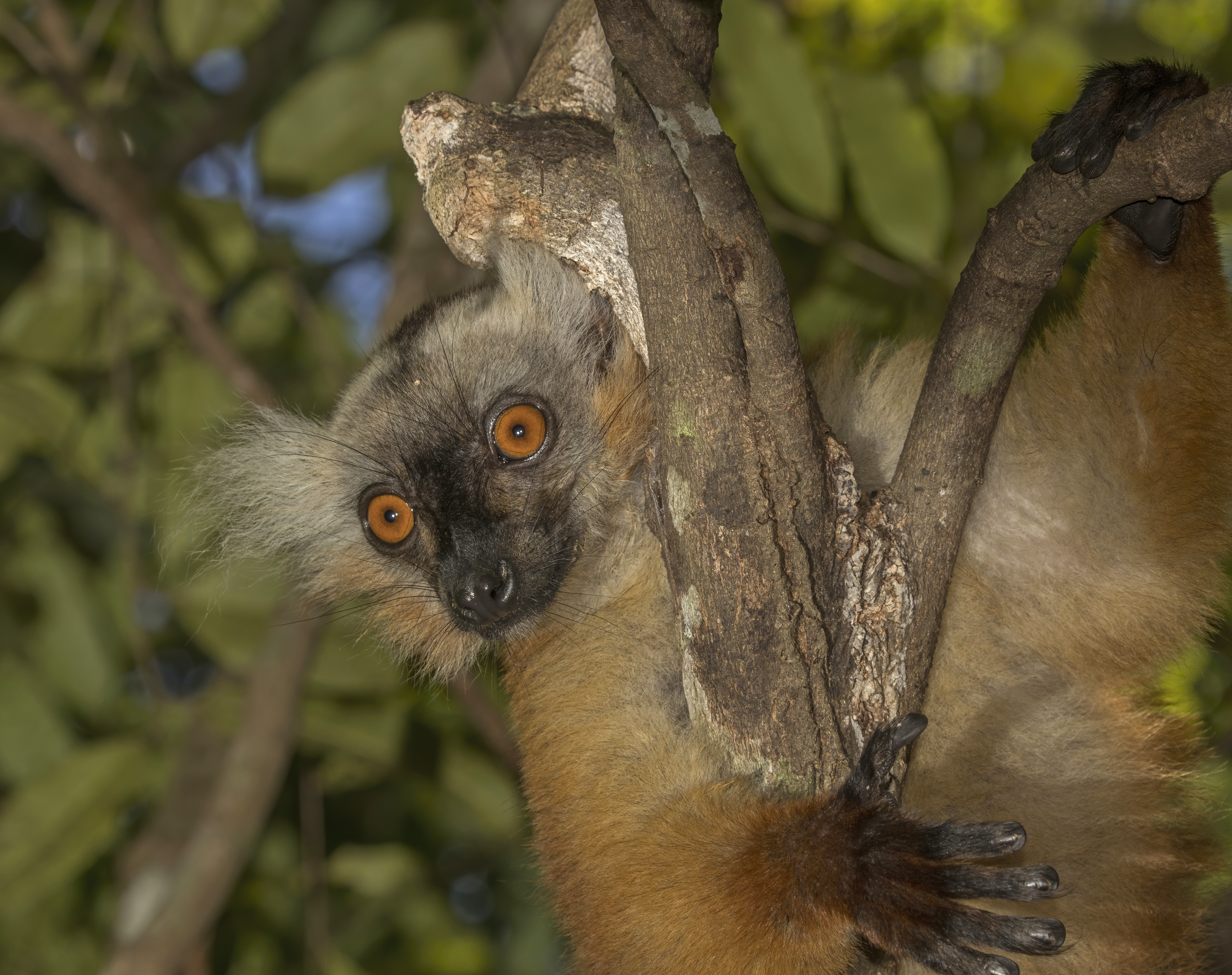
Female black lemur at Lokobe Strict Reserve, Nosy Be

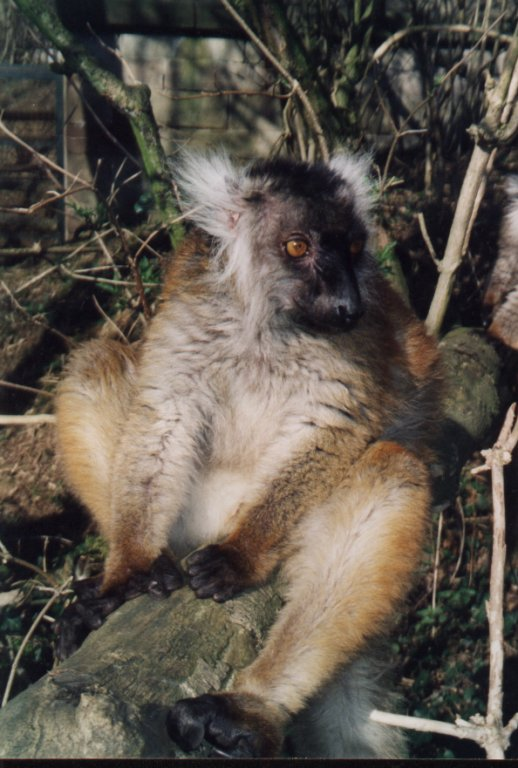
Female black lemur

== Predation ==
Suspected or confirmed predators of black lemurs include small Indian civets, Malagasy civets, ring-tailed mongooses, and Malagasy ground boas (Acrantophis madagascariensis).
