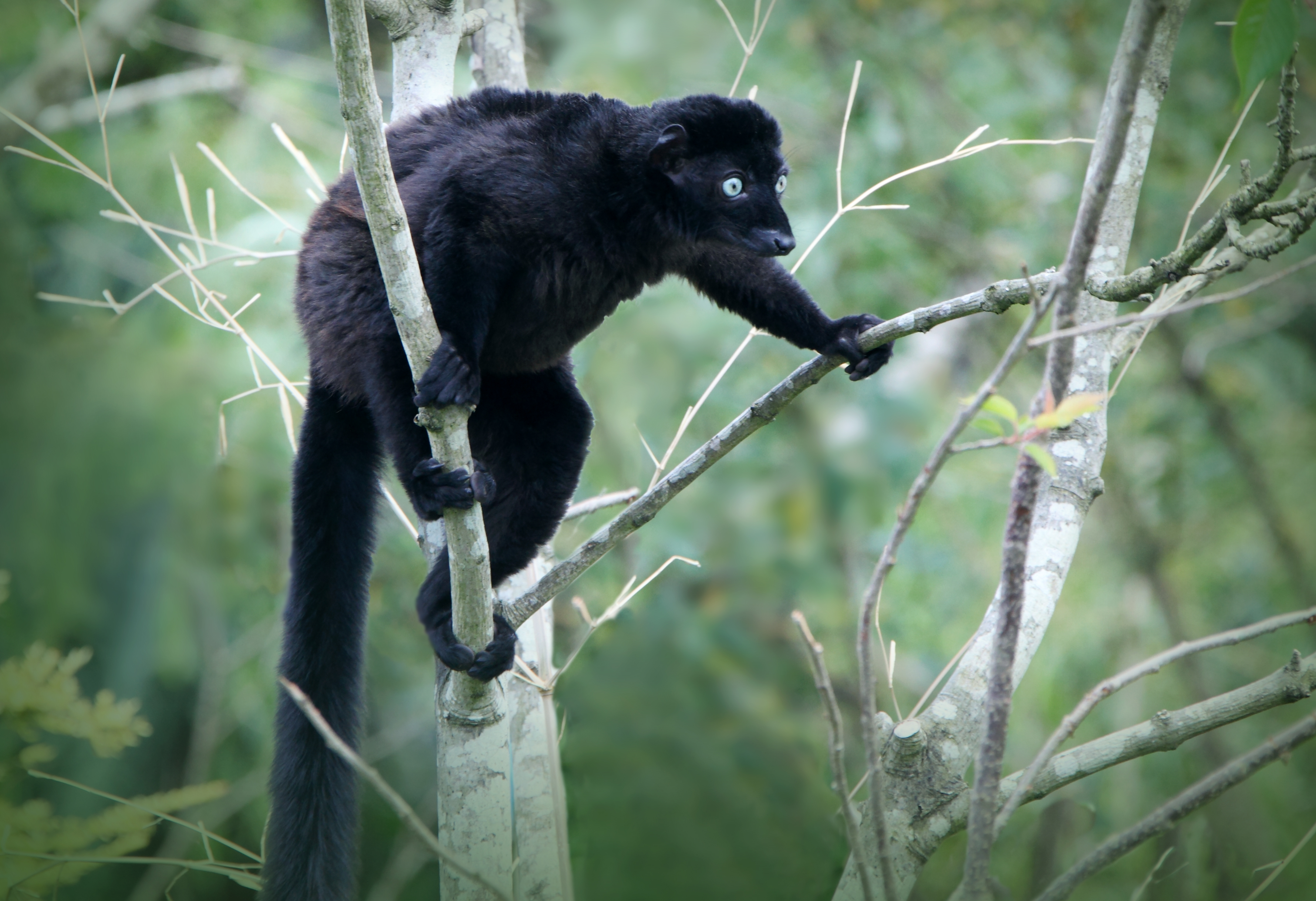
- Black-haired male, Bristol Zoo
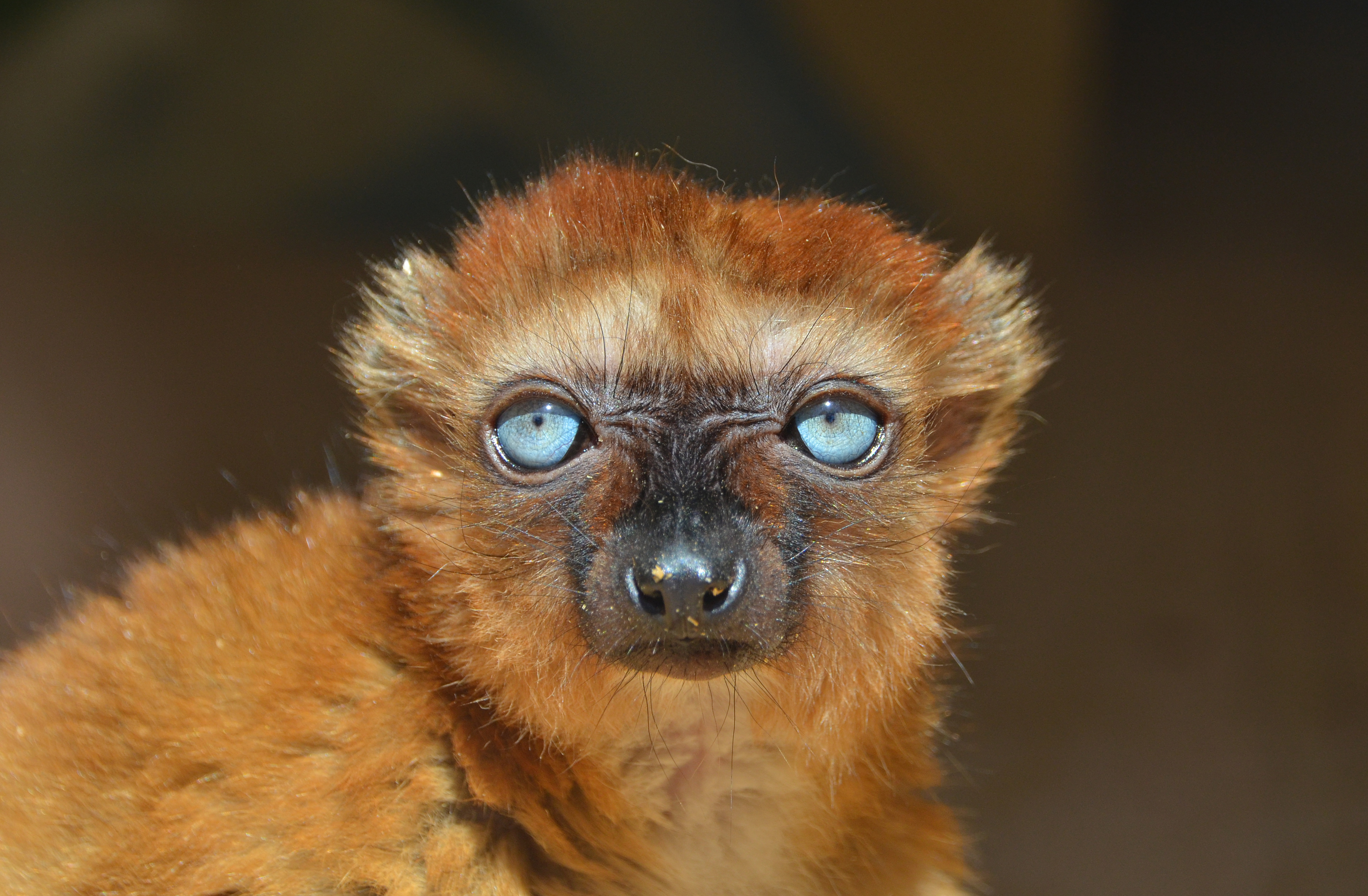
- Reddish-brown-haired female

Conservation status
- Critically Endangered (IUCN 3.1)
- CITES Appendix I

Scientific classification
- Kingdom: Animalia
- Phylum: Chordata
- Class: Mammalia
- Order: Primates
- Suborder: Strepsirrhini
- Family: Lemuridae
- Genus: Eulemur
- Species: E. flavifrons

Binomial name
- Eulemur flavifrons J. E. Gray, 1867
- Distribution of E. flavifrons

Synonyms
- nigerrimus Sclater, 1880

= Blue-eyed black lemur =

Species of true lemur

The blue-eyed black lemur (Eulemur flavifrons), also known as the Sclater's lemur, is a species of true lemur. It can attain a body length of 39–45 cm (15–18 in), a tail length of 51–65 cm (20–26 in), a total length of 90–100 cm (35–39 in), and a weight of 1.8–1.9 kg (4.0–4.2 lb). Being a primate, it has strong hands with palms like a human, which have a rubbery texture to give it a firm grip on branches. Its tail is longer than its body and is non-prehensile.

Like many of the species in the genus Eulemur, the blue-eyed black lemur is sexually dichromatic. Males are solid black in color, with the hairs sometimes tinged brown at the roots. Females are reddish-brown in color with their underside and outline of their face a lighter tan. They have a dark brown or gray muzzle and the back of their hands and feet are a similar dark color. Both sexes have blue eyes, hence the common name, and are one of the only primates other than humans to consistently have blue eyes. The eyes can range in color from a shocking electric blue, a light sky-blue, or a softer gray-blue.

Although the blue-eyed black lemur and the black lemur look similar, they can be differentiated by the blue eyes and lack of prominent ear tufts of this species, while the black lemur has orange-red eyes and long, spiky cheek hairs. In the Manongarivo Special reserve, where the range of the two species overlap, there is a report of hybridization between the two species, but the resulting offspring always have orange eyes. Until 2008, the blue-eyed black lemur was considered a subspecies, E. macaco flavifrons, of the black lemur.

== Behavior ==
The species has not been studied intensively in the wild, but it is known to be fairly social. Group sizes vary from four to eleven individuals on average. Females are dominant as in most lemur species, and there are usually more males than females in each social group. The blue-eyed black lemur is thought to be polygynous. Females give birth to one or two offspring in June or July, after a gestation of 120 to 129 days. The young are weaned after about 5–6 months, and reach maturity at about 2 years of age. It may live between 15 and 30 years in captivity, with little data recorded on their longevity in the wild. It demonstrates a cathemeral activity pattern, being awake sporadically throughout the day. The occasional nighttime activities are thought to be based on the intensity of the moonlight.

The blue-eyed black lemur communicates with scent-marking, vocalizations, and perhaps some facial expressions. Scent marking is an important means of communication as with most lemur species. Both genders will mark on trees with anogenital glands, while males will also mark using wrist and palm glands by rubbing and twisting them against leaves, twigs or branches. Males also use a scent gland on the top of their head to mark, lowering their head and rubbing in quick sliding motions. Little is known of its vocalizations, but it has been observed making a variety of grunts, chirps, barks and clicks. The males are known to make a sharp 'scree' when distressed.

The blue-eyed black lemur has also been observed to be a highly aggressive species. There is frequent infighting between troop members, especially during the breeding and birthing seasons. In captivity it has been observed committing infanticide against other species of lemurs, a behavior that is usually uncommon, especially in captivity.

=== Diet ===
Fruit, pollen, and nectar make up the bulk of this lemur's diet. During the dry season when food is scarce it may eat leaves, seeds and berries and rarely insects. It may also raid farmlands and eat some of the crops, which may lead to it being shot by farmers.

The blue-eyed black lemur helps propagate many rain forest plants. Since it digests the flesh but not the seeds of the fruits it eats, it spreads the seeds of more than 50 different plant species (deposited in a fresh pile of fertilizer), and some plants may have evolved specifically to be dispersed by this lemur. The blue-eyed black lemur also pollinates many plants while it eats nectar and pollen from the plants' flowers.

== Habitat ==
The blue-eyed black lemur inhabits primary and secondary sub-tropical moist and dry forests in the northwestern tip of Madagascar. Its range extends from the Andranomalaza River in the north, to the Maevarano River in the south. Some areas where it can readily be seen are in the forests south of Maromandia near Antsiranana. It may also be seen in the remaining forest patches of the Sahamalaza Peninsula, such as the Ankarafa forest.

== Conservation ==
Humans have cut down almost all of this species' habitat to clear farm land. As a result, the blue-eyed black lemur is nearly extinct in the wild. The blue-eyed black lemur is listed on Appendix I of CITES, and is critically endangered. As few as 1,000 individuals are thought to remain in the wild, largely due to slash and burn habitat destruction, as well as a mild threat from hunting problems.
