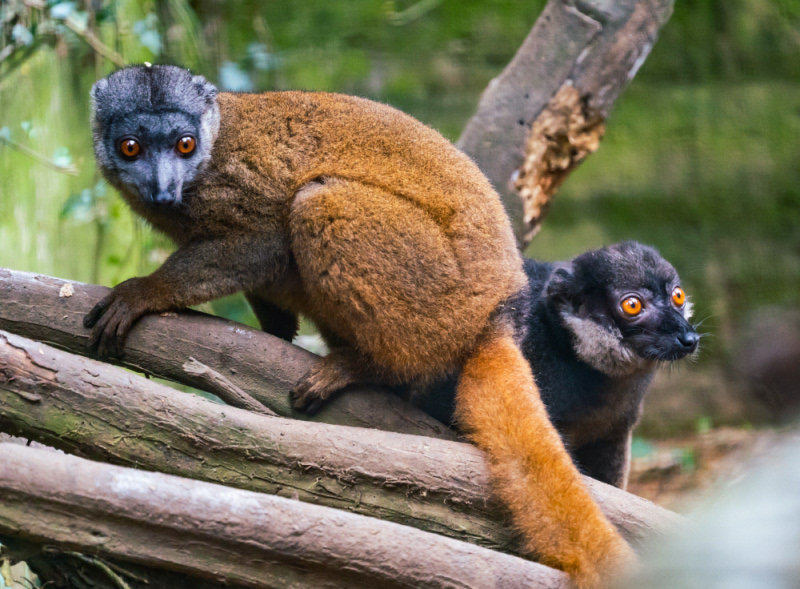

Conservation status
- Critically Endangered (IUCN 3.1)
- CITES Appendix I

Scientific classification
- Kingdom: Animalia
- Phylum: Chordata
- Class: Mammalia
- Infraclass: Placentalia
- Order: Primates
- Suborder: Strepsirrhini
- Family: Lemuridae
- Genus: Eulemur
- Species: E. cinereiceps

Binomial name
- Eulemur cinereiceps Grandidier & A. Milne-Edwards, 1890
- Distribution of E. cinereiceps

Synonyms
- albocollaris Rumpler, 1975

= Gray-headed lemur =

Species of lemur

The gray-headed lemur (Eulemur cinereiceps), or gray-headed brown lemur, is a medium-sized primate, a cathemeral species of lemur in the family Lemuridae. Until a taxonomic revision in 2008, it was known as the white-collared brown lemur or white-collared lemur (Eulemur albocollaris). It lives in south-eastern Madagascar. In 2005, satellite imagery estimates showed approximately 700 km^{2} (270 sq mi) of total remaining habitat within its geographic range. It is highly threatened by hunting and habitat loss, and was considered to be among the 25 most endangered primates in 2006–2008. It is currently listed as Critically Endangered by the International Union for Conservation of Nature (IUCN) due to a highly restricted range, and has been named one of "The World's 25 Most Endangered Primates."

The gray-headed lemur is only found in southeastern Madagascar, from the Manampatrana River south to the Mananara River.

== Change in taxonomy ==
Recent genetic and morphological evidence has suggested that the former name, E. albocollaris, was actually a junior synonym of E. cinereiceps. Consequently, the common name gray-headed lemur and the scientific name Eulemur cinereiceps were resurrected to replace white-collared brown lemur and E. albocollaris respectively.

Previously, this species was listed as a subspecies of the common brown lemur until elevated to species status in 2001. However, genetic and field studies still support subspecies status under the biological species concept.
