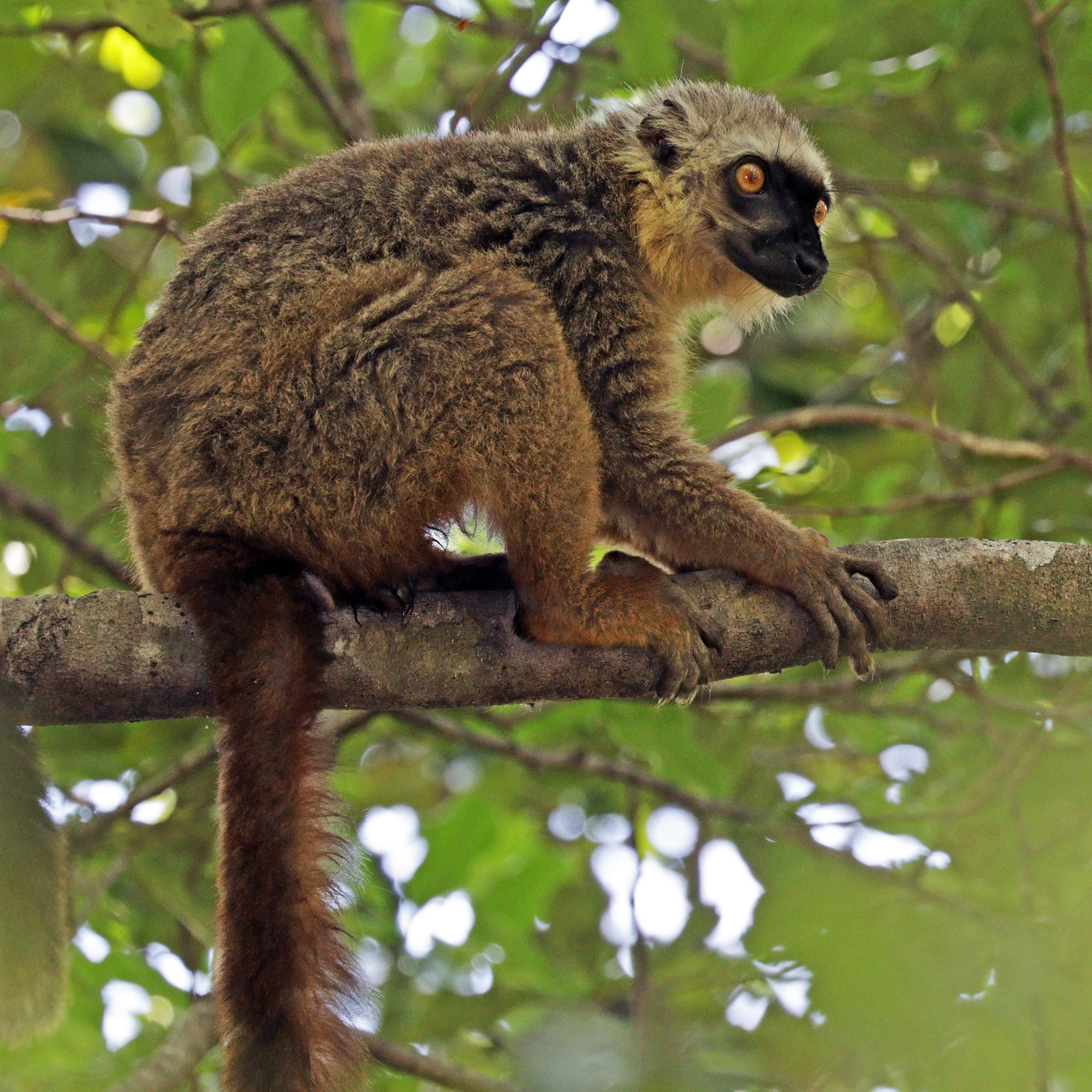
- Male
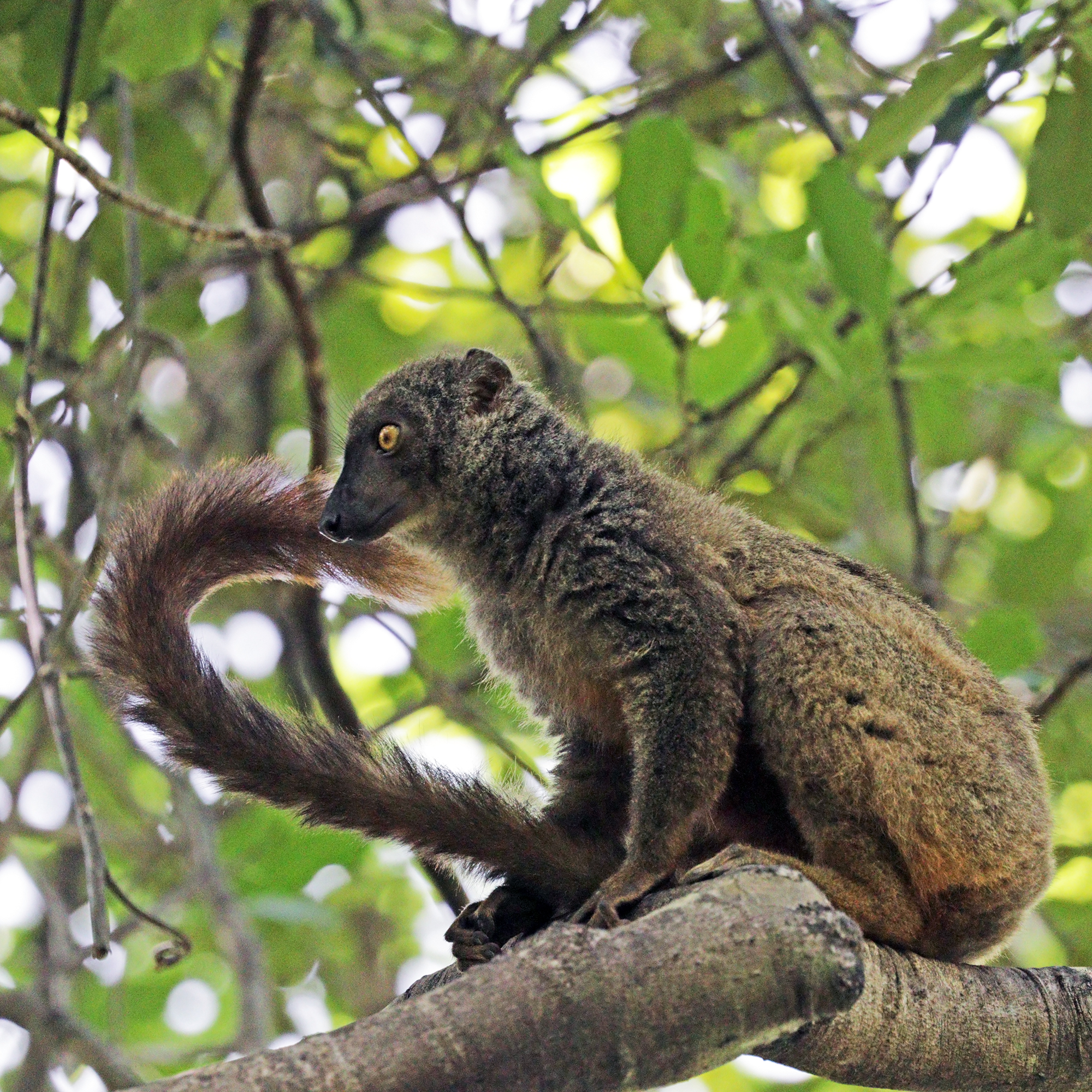
- Female both in Ankarana Reserve

Conservation status
- Endangered (IUCN 3.1)
- CITES Appendix I

Scientific classification
- Kingdom: Animalia
- Phylum: Chordata
- Class: Mammalia
- Infraclass: Placentalia
- Order: Primates
- Suborder: Strepsirrhini
- Family: Lemuridae
- Genus: Eulemur
- Species: E. sanfordi

Binomial name
- Eulemur sanfordi Archbold, 1932
- Distribution of E. sanfordi

= Sanford's brown lemur =

Species of lemur

Sanford's brown lemur (Eulemur sanfordi), or Sanford's lemur, is a species of strepsirrhine primate in the family Lemuridae. Sanford's brown lemur was previously considered a subspecies of the common brown lemur (Eulemur fulvus) but was raised to full species in 2001. It is named after Leonard Cutler Sanford, a trustee of the American Museum of Natural History.

== Physical description ==
Sanford's brown lemur is a medium-sized lemur with a head-to-body length of 38–40 cm (15–16 in), a tail length of 50–55 cm (20–22 in), an overall length of 88–95 cm (35–37 in), and a body weight of 1.8–1.9 kg (4.0–4.2 lb).

This species is sexually dichromatic. Males have a gray to brown dorsal coat which darkens as it reaches the hands, feet and base of the tail. Ventral coat is pale gray to brownish-gray and the tail is dark gray. The nose, muzzle and face are black, with the surrounding area solid white or light gray. Features that distinguish this species from the white-fronted brown lemur are the more prominent ear and cheek tufts. In this species the hair around the ears and on the lower cheek is noticeably longer and has a 'spiked' appearance, while the white-fronted lemur males have a very rounded look to their tufts. The tufts on the Sanford's lemur may be white to cream to rufous, though it is suspected that the darker or rufous variations may be results of hybridization between this species and the crowned lemur which is within the same home range. Male Sanford's brown lemurs also have a light brown 'cap' at the top of the head which the male white-fronted lemur lacks.

Female Sanford's brown lemurs have a gray-brown dorsal coat which darkens to gray around the shoulders and upper area of the back to the top of the head. The ventral coat is a paler gray, and the face is a similar gray color with variable light patches above the eyes. Tail is often darker than the dorsal coat and can range in color from gray-brown to dark gray. From a distance, female Sanford's brown lemurs can be almost indistinguishable from female white-fronted brown lemurs, but at a close range there are a few subtle difference. There is a slight difference in coat color and variation but notable differences are in the face. White-fronted females will have a small light spot at the corner of their mouths, while female Sanford's lack the lip patches and have variable light areas around the eyes. Sanford's brown lemur females also tend to have longer, bushier hair on their cheeks than do white-fronted females.

== Behavior and ecology ==
=== Habitat ===
This species is found at the very northernmost tip of Madagascar, ranging from Antsiranana to Ampanakana. Their populations are concentrated in a few forests – Ankarana, Analamerana and Montagne d'Ambre, with a small disjunct population in the Daraina region. The Manambato river is the southern limit of its range, although hybrids of the Sanford's brown lemur and white-fronted brown lemur appear to occur between Vohemar and Sambava. This species occurs in tropical moist, dry lowland and montane forests up to elevations of 1,400 m.

In Ankarana it appears to favor secondary forest and is active at both day and night. Sanford's brown lemur is said to display a cathemeral activity pattern, becoming most active in the afternoon and evening with occasional bouts at night.

Sanford's brown lemur is reported to associate with the crowned lemur during the wet season, a time of greater food availability. This friendly behavior would explain the occasional reports of hybrids between the two species.

=== Groups ===
Sanford's brown lemur troop sizes range from 3 to 15 individuals, numbers varying depending on location. Each troop defends a territory of up to 14 hectares, and will chase off intruding groups with territory calls rather than defending home ranges violently.

There is no evidence of female dominance in this species, which is unusual in the family Lemuridae but appears to be frequent in brown lemur species.

=== Reproduction ===
Mating occurs in late May and births usually take place in late September or early October after a gestation of about 120 days.

Typically only one young is born, but in captivity they could rarely produce twins. As with most true lemur species, newborn Sanford's Lemurs cling to the mother's chest at first and after about two weeks they transfer onto her back. Young may be weaned by three or four months of age and they reach sexual maturity at two years.

=== Diet ===
The diet of this species consists primarily of fruit, but includes other plant parts (buds, young leaves, flowers) according to seasonal availability, and also includes the occasional invertebrate (e.g., centipedes, millipedes and spiders). Consumption of insects is thought to be based on removing them rather than for nutrition. These biting invertebrates are a considerable pest and can be potentially harmful to them due to the toxic secretions. A millipede's defensive poison, exuded when a lemur bites or agitates the invertebrate, may be rubbed on the body in a behavior known as "millipede washing" in order to repel biting insects (i.e. malaria-carrying mosquitoes).

== Conservation status ==
Sanford's brown lemur is considered to be Endangered, and among the rarest of the brown lemurs. Primary threats to its survival are habitat loss due to logging and mining, but hunting is starting to become a significant problem as well. The species is known to be hunted and kept as pets by locals in the Antsiranana region.
