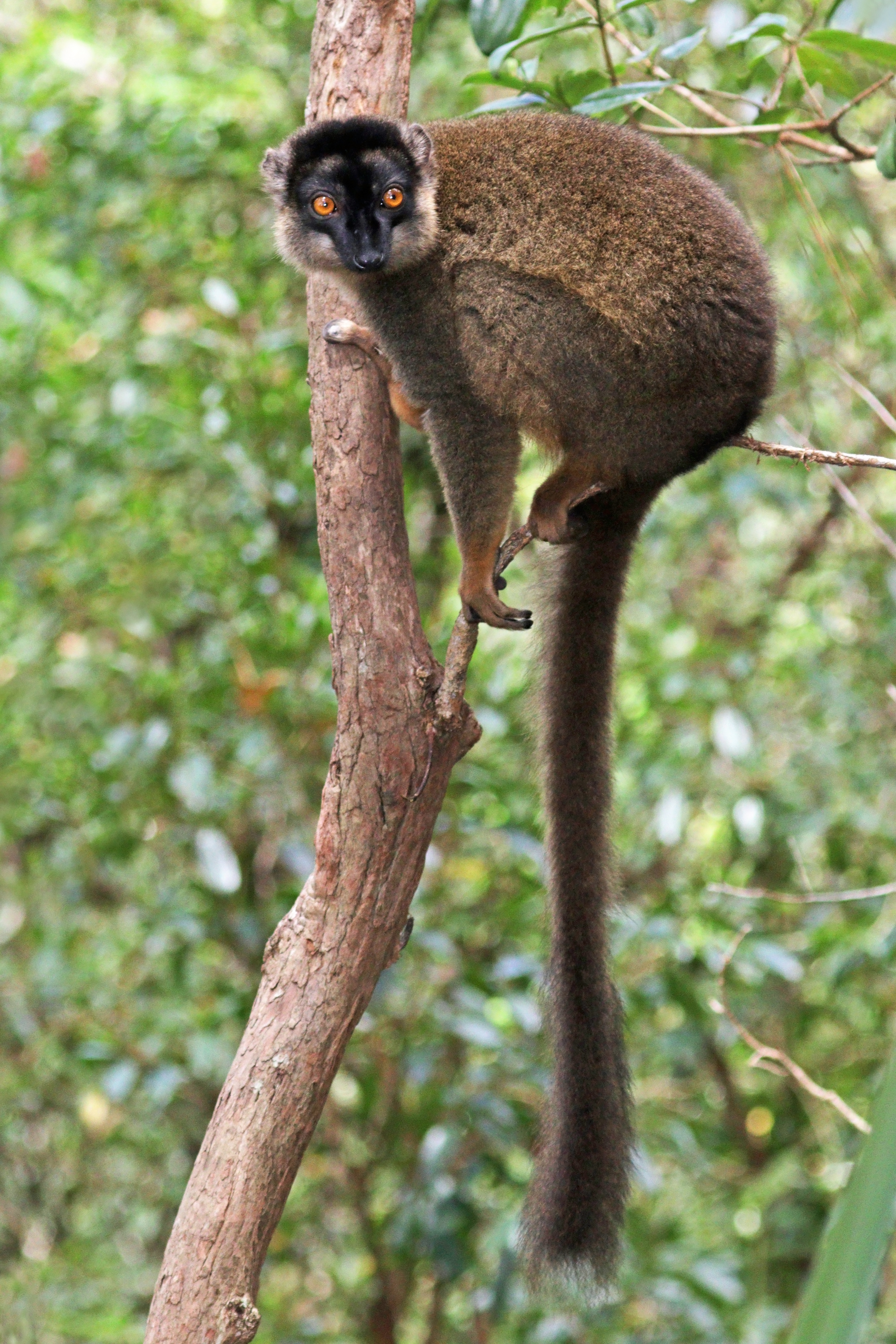
- Male
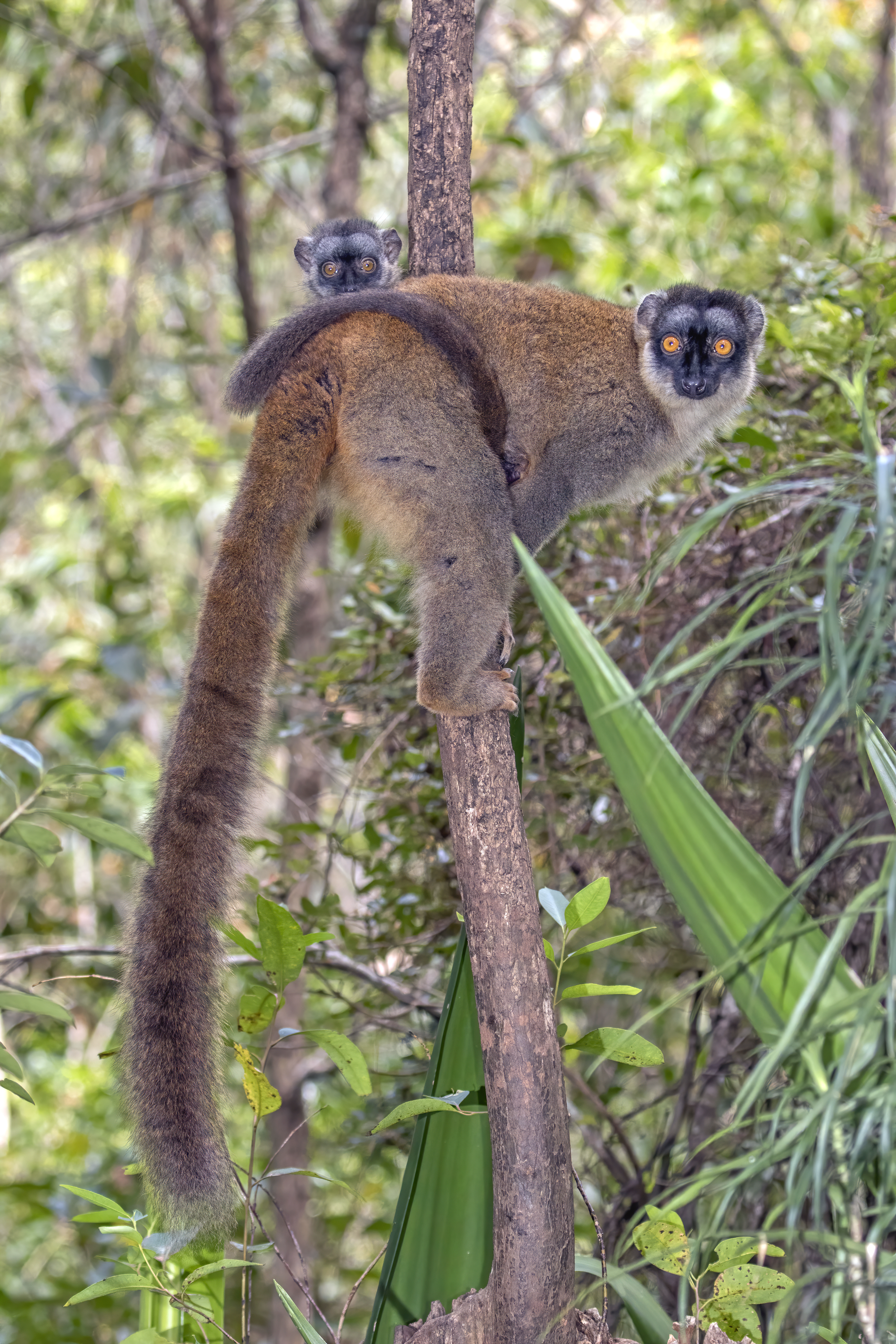
- Female with juvenile both in Peyrieras, Madagascar

Conservation status
- Vulnerable (IUCN 3.1)
- CITES Appendix I

Scientific classification
- Kingdom: Animalia
- Phylum: Chordata
- Class: Mammalia
- Infraclass: Placentalia
- Order: Primates
- Suborder: Strepsirrhini
- Family: Lemuridae
- Genus: Eulemur
- Species: E. fulvus

Binomial name
- Eulemur fulvus É. Geoffroy, 1796
- Distribution of E. fulvus: red = native, green = introduced

Synonyms
- bruneus van der Hoeven, 1844; mayottensis Schlegel, 1866

= Common brown lemur =

Species of lemur

The common brown lemur (Eulemur fulvus) is a species of lemur in the family Lemuridae. It is found in Madagascar and has been introduced to Mayotte.

== Taxonomy ==
Five additional currently recognized species of lemur were until 2001 considered subspecies of E. fulvus. These are:

- White-fronted brown lemur, E. albifrons
- Gray-headed lemur, E. cinereiceps
- Collared brown lemur, E. collaris
- Red-fronted brown lemur, E. rufus
- Sanford's brown lemur, E. sanfordi

However, a number of zoologists believe that E. albifrons and E. rufus should continue to be considered subspecies of E. fulvus.

== Physical description ==
The common brown lemur has a total length of 84 to 101 cm (33 to 40 in), including 41 to 51 cm (16 to 20 in) of tail. Weight ranges from 2 to 3 kg (4.4 to 6.6 lb). Common brown lemurs are unique amongst Eulemur in that they exhibit little-to-no sexual dichromatism: in both males and females, the face, muzzle and crown are dark gray or black, with white or tan "cheeks" of varying thickness. Some individuals may have pale-colored eyebrow patches, and the eyes are almost always a deep orange-red. The short, dense fur of the body is primarily brown or gray-brown, with a lighter gray or tan underside. The fur on the back of their hands is often a medium orange or reddish color, and their long, bushy tail may either be similar in color to the dorsal pelage or, more commonly, a darker shade of gray, black, or brown.

Due to the species' history of containing all fellow brown lemurs as subspecies, they are very commonly misidentified in images and texts, and often confused with other species (such as red-fronted lemurs and gray-headed lemurs) or with various other unrelated hybrids.

Similar lemur species within their range include the mongoose lemur (E. mongoz) in the west and the red-bellied lemur (E. rubriventer) in the east. They can be distinguished from these species by the fact that E. mongoz is more of a grey color and E. rubriventer is more reddish. There is also some overlap with the black lemur in northeast Madagascar in the Galoko, Manongarivo and Tsaratanana Massifs. There is also overlap and hybridization with the white-fronted brown lemur, E. albifrons, in the northeast portion of the common brown lemur's range.

== Behavior ==
Consistent with its large range, the common brown lemur occupies a variety of forest types, including lowland rainforests, montane rainforests, moist evergreen forests and dry deciduous forests. They spend about 95% of their time in upper layers of the forest and less than 2% of their time on the ground.

They normally live in groups of 5 to 12, but group size can be larger, especially on Mayotte. Groups occupy home ranges of 1 to 9 hectares in the west, but more than 20 hectares in the east. Groups include members of both sexes, including juveniles, and there are no discernible dominance hierarchies.

They are primarily active during the day, but can exhibit cathemeral activity and continue into the night, especially during full moons and during the dry season.

In the western part of its range, the common brown lemur overlaps that of the mongoose lemur, and the two species sometimes travel together. In the areas of overlap, the two species also adapt their activity patterns to avoid conflict. For example, the mongoose lemur can become primarily nocturnal during the dry season in the areas of overlap.

At Berenty (south Madagascar) there is a population of introduced E. fulvus rufus x collaris. These lemurs show linear hierarchy, adult female dominance, and the presence of conciliatory behavior after aggressions. Additionally, stress levels (measured via self-directed behaviors) decrease at the increase of the hierarchical position of individuals within the social group and reconciliation is able to bring stress down to the baseline levels.

=== Reproduction ===
The common brown lemur's mating season is May and June. After a gestation period of about 120 days, the young are born in September and October. Single births are most common, but twins have been reported. The young are weaned after about 4 to 5 months. Sexual maturity occurs at about 18 months, and females give birth to their first young at 2 years old. Life span can be as long as 30+ years.

== Ecology ==
=== Diet ===
The common brown lemur's diet consists primarily of fruits, young leaves, and flowers. In some locations it eats invertebrates, such as cicadas, spiders and millipedes. It also eats bark, sap, soil and red clay (see geophagy). It can tolerate greater levels of toxic compounds from plants than other lemurs can.

The common brown lemur from a Brazilian zoo was found to be a host of an intestinal acanthocephalan parasitic worm,Pachysentis dollfusi. It is unknown if the worm originates from Brazil or Madagascar.

== Distribution ==
The common brown lemur lives in western Madagascar north of the Betsiboka River and eastern Madagascar between the Mangoro River and Tsaratanana, as well as in inland Madagascar connecting the eastern and western ranges. They also live on the island of Mayotte, although this population has been introduced there by man.
