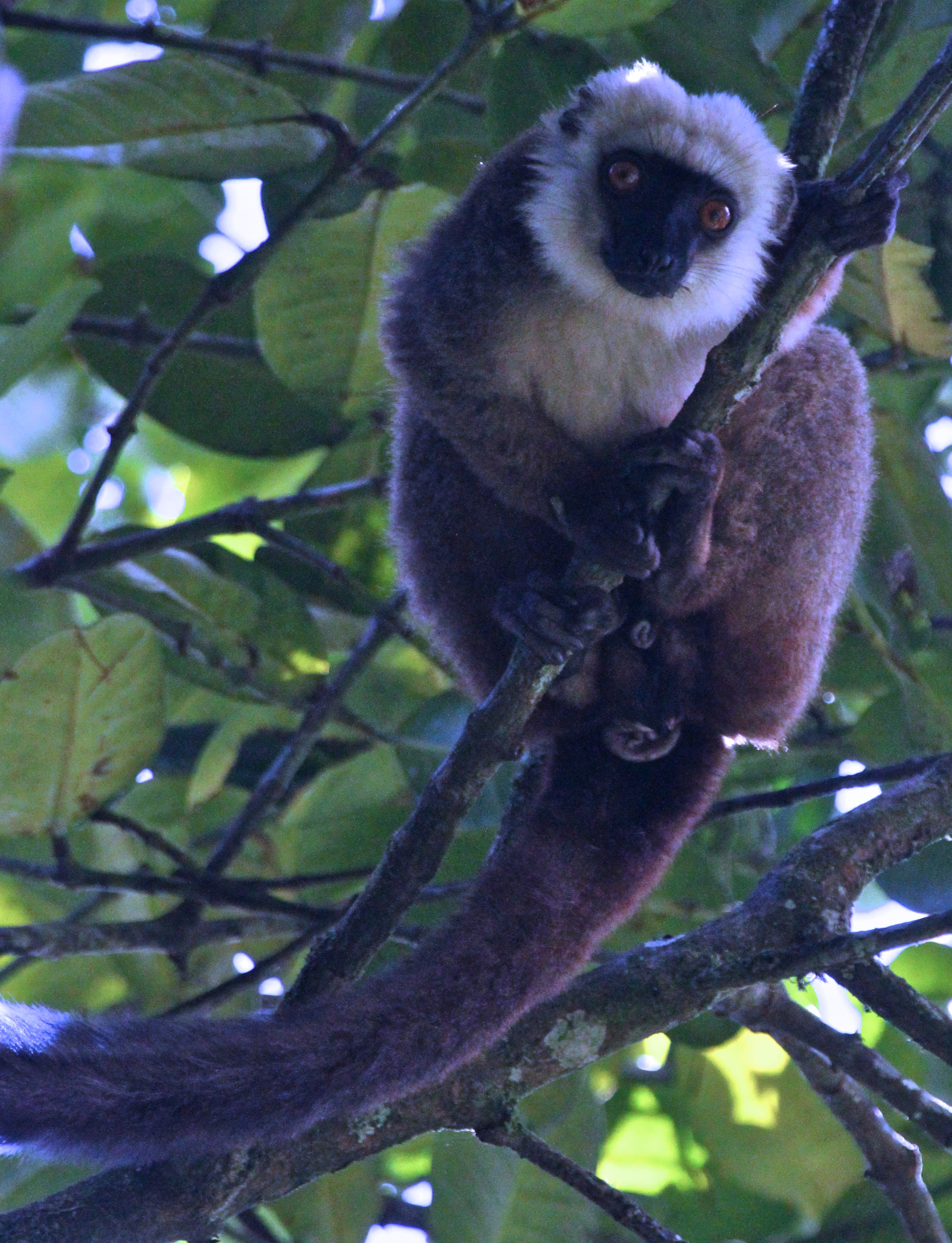

Conservation status
- Vulnerable (IUCN 3.1)
- CITES Appendix I

Scientific classification
- Kingdom: Animalia
- Phylum: Chordata
- Class: Mammalia
- Infraclass: Placentalia
- Order: Primates
- Suborder: Strepsirrhini
- Family: Lemuridae
- Genus: Eulemur
- Species: E. albifrons

Binomial name
- Eulemur albifrons É. Geoffroy, 1796
- Distribution of E. albifrons

Synonyms
- frederici Lesson, 1840

= White-headed lemur =

Species of lemur

The white-headed lemur (Eulemur albifrons), also known as the white-headed brown lemur, white-fronted brown lemur, or white-fronted lemur, is a species of primate in the family Lemuridae. It is only found in north-eastern Madagascar. It is arboreal and is usually found in rainforest treetops. It was formerly recognised as a subspecies of the common brown lemur (Eulemur fulvus).

== Physical characteristics ==
The white-headed lemur is a medium-sized lemur and has a horizontal posture, which is suited to its way of movement. It has a long furry tail assisting it in maintaining its balance as it lands from leaping at a considerable distance. Males have gray-brown upper parts, with darker lower limbs and tail, paler gray upper parts, gray head and face and a darker crown. Females have redder-brown upper parts, paler underparts and darker feet than males. The cheeks and beards are white, bushy and pronounced in males, reddish-brown and less bushy in females. The head, face and muzzle of the female are dark gray, but without the bushy cheeks of the male. The white-headed lemur has an average body weight of 2.3 kg (5.1 lb), and body length of 40 cm (16 in), and its tail can grow up to 50 cm (20 in).

White-headed lemurs can live up to 30 years.

The species was previously classified as Eulemur fulvus albifrons, a subspecies of the common brown lemur, and although very similar in appearance genetic analysis supports distinct species status.

== Habitat and range ==
This lemur is mostly found in moist lowland and montane rainforests. The white-headed lemur is arboreal and spends most of its time in the upper layers of the forest. It is only found in north-eastern Madagascar.

== Behaviour and mating ==
This species is cathemeral, meaning it is active at varying times throughout the day and night. It has an omnivorous diet consisting of fruit, mature leaves, flowers, bark, sap, soil, insects, centipedes and millipedes. The diet changes depending on the reproductive stage of the females, during gestation both males and females supplement their diet with flowers, during lactation, more flowers and young leaves and when nonreproductive they eat more mature leaves and miscellaneous other items like millipedes.

The mating system of this lemur has not been reported. However, other species in the genus Eulemur are either monogamous or polygynous. It is likely that the white-headed lemur is similar. For the first three weeks of its life, a young lemur hangs onto its mother's belly, altering its grasp only to nurse. After three weeks have passed, it shifts and rides on the mother's back. It then starts to take its first steps. Following this, it starts to sample solid food, nibbling on whatever the other members of the group happen to be eating. This is its first sign of independence. Nursing continues but its importance in the infant's diet tapers. The young lemur is weaned after approximately four months, usually by January.

Unlike other members of the genus, females are not usually dominant to males, so the degree to which females exert active mate choice is not known. It forms multi-male multi-female groups. Depending on the population, the size of these groups can vary, they usually number three to twelve individuals, although five to seven seems to be average.

== Status ==
Eulemur albifrons is classified as Vulnerable on the IUCN Red List.
