= Charlotte Uhlenbroek =

Zoologist, television presenter

- Born: 16 May 1967 (age 59); London, England
- Education: University of Bristol
- Occupations: television presenter; zoologist
- Spouse: Daniel Rees (2006–present)

Charlotte Jane Uhlenbroek (born 16 May 1967) is a British zoologist and BBC television presenter.

== Early life ==
Her Dutch father was an agricultural specialist with the United Nations who took his English wife and their family round the world with him. Uhlenbroek was born in London, but her parents moved to Ghana when she was only ten days old. Between the ages of 5 and 14 she lived in Kathmandu, Nepal.

== Education and scientific work ==
Uhlenbroek attended Oakham School in Rutland, and then gained a BSc degree in Zoology and Psychology in 1988, followed in 1997 by a PhD degree in Zoology, at the University of Bristol. She spent six months in Burundi helping primatologist Jane Goodall set up a conservation project for chimpanzees, followed by four years in the forests of Gombe Stream National Park in Western Tanzania on the shores of Lake Tanganyika, studying the communication of wild chimpanzees. In 2007, Uhlenbroek was awarded an honorary degree from Oxford Brookes University for her work.

== Television career ==
Spotted by the BBC Natural History Unit, Uhlenbroek made her UK television debut in the series Dawn to Dusk, presented by Jonathan Scott, in an episode on the chimpanzees of Gombe Stream National Park. She went on to present the BBC Two programme Chimpanzee Diary as part of the Animal Zone during 1998 and 1999. Uhlenbroek subsequently presented a number of documentaries (both series and one-off programmes) for the BBC, including: Cousins (2000), Congo's Secret Chimps (2001), Talking with Animals (2002), Jungle (2003), Secret Gorillas of Mondika (2005). In 2004, she was one of the subjects of the short documentary series The Way We Went Wild, about television's natural history presenters.

Uhlenbroek visited the Mefou National Park in Cameroon in 2006 to provide narration for Animal Planet's Going Ape TV series, based on the charity Ape Action Africa.

In 2007, she presented Safari School, a twenty-part BBC Two "reality" series in which eight celebrities had to learn to become game rangers at the Shamwari Game Reserve. In 2009 she was associate producer for and presented Among the Apes, a four-part series on Five, each part concerning a different primate species.

In recent years she has made minor appearances on BBC nature programmes, written about elephant conservation in the Daily Mail and been involved with several conservation charities.

=== Synopsis ===
Year	Title	Channel	Role	Notes
1996	Nature	PBS	Scientific consultant	One episode, "Jane Goodall's Wild Chimpanzees"
1998–1999	Chimpanzee Diary	BBC Two	Presenter	Part of Animal Zone
2000	Cousins	BBC One	Presenter	
2001	Congo's Secret Chimps	BBC Two	Presenter	Part of Wild Zone
2002	Talking with Animals	BBC One	Presenter	
2003	Jungle	BBC One	Presenter	
2005	Lemurs of Madagascar	BBC Two	Presenter	
2005	Secret Gorillas of Mondika	BBC Two	Presenter	
2006	Going Ape	Animal Planet	Narrator	Filmed at Ape Action Africa, Cameroon
2007	Safari School	BBC Two	Presenter	Reality TV
2009	Among the Apes	Five	Presenter; Associate Producer	
2009	The Museum of Curiosity	BBC Radio 4	Panelist	Series 2 Episode 4
2011	The Adventurer's Guide to Britain	ITV1	Co-presenter	
2013	Going Ape	National Geographic Channel	Features presenter	
2013	Springwatch	BBC Two	Features presenter	
2014	Countryfile	BBC One	Features presenter	

== Personal life ==
Uhlenbroek supports Animal Aid and their campaign against primate experiments, stating: "I have yet to hear a sufficiently compelling scientific argument that justifies the suffering inflicted on primates in medical research." She is also a supporter of many animal-orientated charities, including Ape Action Africa, Fauna and Flora International, For Life On Earth the Great Apes Survival Project, the Kathmandu Animal Treatment Centre and Compassion in World Farming.

== Publications ==
- The Structure and Function of the Long-distance Calls Given by Male Chimpanzees in Gombe National Park (PhD Thesis), 1995
- Talking With Animals, 2002
- Jungle, 2004
- Animal Life (editor), 2008
- Illustrated Encyclopedia of Animal Life, 2012

Uhlenbroek also wrote the introduction to Wildlife Portfolio of the Year: Volume Nine, one of an annual collection of prize-winning images.
