= Méfou-et-Afamba =

Mefou-et-Afamba
- Department
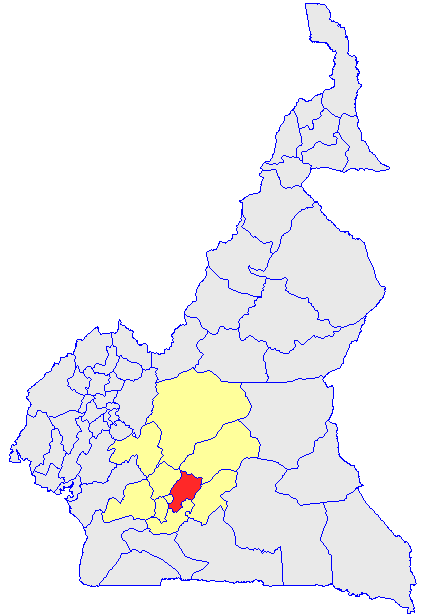
- Department location in Cameroon

- Location within Cameroon Location within Africa
- Country: Cameroon
- Province: Centre Province
- Capital: Mfou

Government
  - Governor: Sylvain Moussongo
  - Deputy Governor: François Mbarga

Area
  - Total: 1,297 sq mi (3,358 km^{2})

Population (2001)
  - Total: 89,805
- Time zone: UTC+1 (WAT)

Mefou-et-Afamba is a department of Centre Province in Cameroon. The department covers an area of 3,358 km^{2} and in 2001 had a total population of 89,805. The capital of the department lies at Mfou.

== Subdivisions ==
The department is divided administratively into 8 communes, and in turn into villages:

- Afanloum
- Awaé
- Edzendouan
- Esse
- Mfou
- Nkolafamba
- Olanguina
- Soa

== See also ==
- Mefou National Park
