= Cousins (TV series) =

British nature documentary TV series

- VHS cover art
- Genre: Nature documentary
- Presented by: Charlotte Uhlenbroek
- Composer: Guy Michelmore
- Country of origin: United Kingdom
- Original language: English
- No. of episodes: 3

Production
- Producer: Bernard Walton
- Running time: 50 minutes
- Production companies: BBC Natural History Unit; Discovery Channel

Original release
- Network: BBC One
- Release: 16 August – 30 August 2000

Cousins is a nature documentary TV series produced by the BBC Natural History Unit in Bristol, England, first transmitted in the UK on BBC One in August 2000. The series looks at the primates, the closest living relatives to human beings.

The series marked the debut as a television presenter of Charlotte Uhlenbroek, a 32-year-old primatologist who had worked with Jane Goodall at Gombe Stream studying chimpanzee behaviour. Over the course of the three, 50-minute episodes, Uhlenbroek encounters many species of primate, from the lemurs of Madagascar to the mountain gorillas of Rwanda. The animal behaviour filmed is used to explain the origins of primates and the development of skills and adaptations that have enabled human beings to become the most successful primate of all.

== Production ==
Filming took place on three continents. Some of the difficulties encountered by the filmmakers in Madagascar when filming black-and-white ruffed lemurs included leeches and swaying platforms in the canopy, whilst in China, the crew had to form a protective ring around the cameraman to protect against muggings by Tibetan macaques. The series producer was Bernard Walton.

== Episodes ==
=== 1. "First Primates" ===
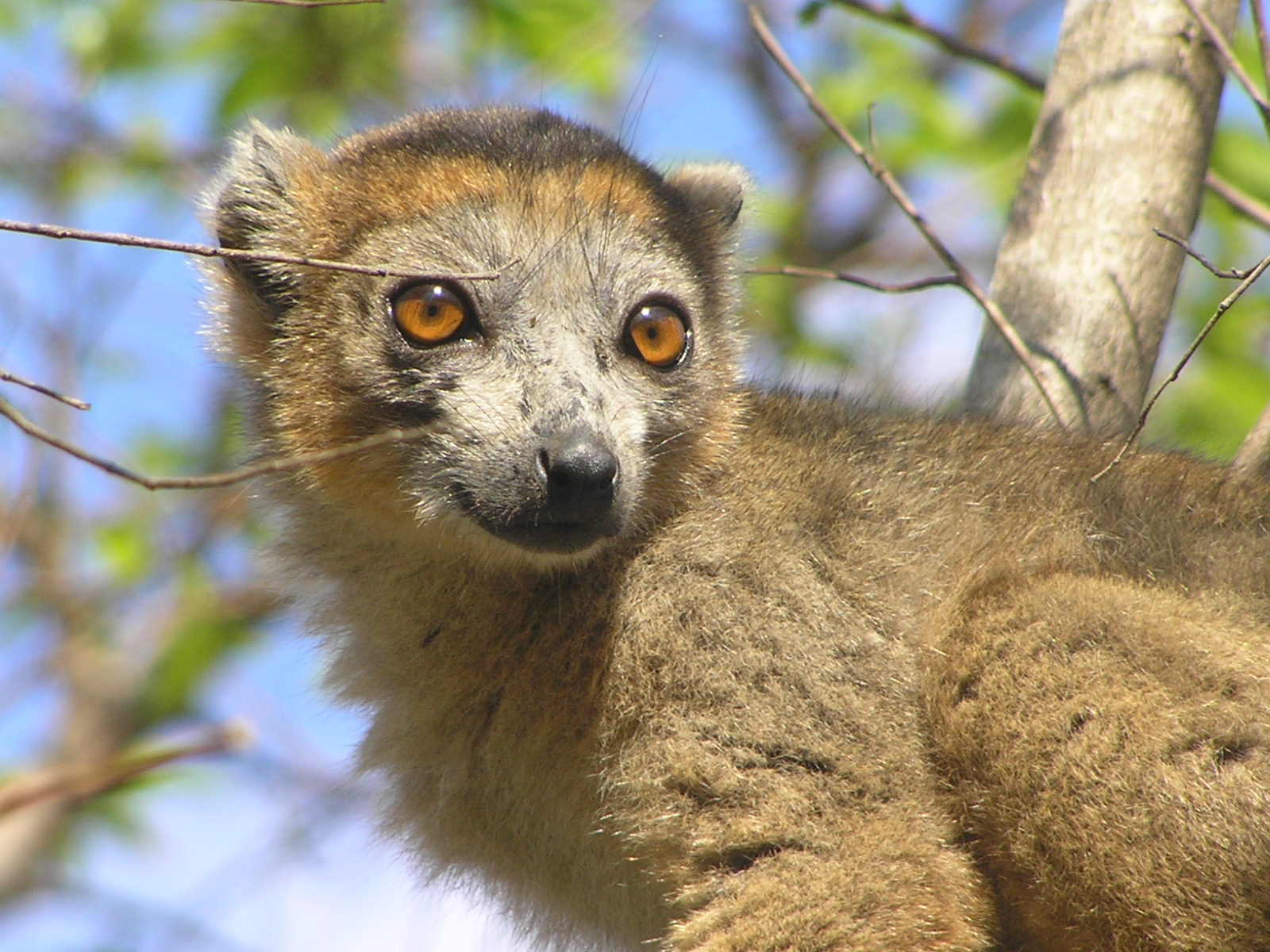
Uhlenbroek observes crowned lemurs on the Ankarana Plateau

Featured prosimian species:

- Pygmy mouse lemur (Madagascar)
- Mohol bushbaby (Africa)
- Slow loris (Southeast Asia)
- Tarsier (South East Asia)
- Verreaux's sifaka (Madagascar)
- Bandro (Madagascar)
- Greater bamboo lemur (Madagascar)
- Crowned lemur (Madagascar)
- Brown lemur (Madagascar)
- Aye-aye (Madagascar)
- Ring-tailed lemur (Madagascar)

Uhlenbroek begins the series in Africa, observing a group of chimpanzees in the West African forest. In the Virunga Mountains of Rwanda she gets her first close encounter with a group of mountain gorillas. Like the chimps, they are descended from a common ancestor, similar to the pygmy mouse lemur found today in Madagascar's dry forests. It is a prosimian, a group of primates which are largely nocturnal, forced to hunt and feed at night by the more successful monkeys and apes. In common with all primates they have forward-facing eyes and grasping hands. Other prosimians shown include Mohol bushbabies and Southeast Asia's slow lorises and tarsiers. The larger primates never reached Madagascar, making the island a sanctuary for prosimians, especially lemurs. Uhlenbroek watches Verreaux's sifakas feeding in didierea trees, then travels to the reed beds around Madagascar's largest lake to track the rare and elusive bandro. Greater bamboo lemurs are filmed for the first time. The limestone karst landscape of north Madagascar is home to crowned lemurs, and under the cliffs is a 40 km long labyrinth of caves where giant fossilised lemurs have been discovered. Brown lemurs are shown eluding their main predators, a Madagascar harrier-hawk and a fossa. The aye-aye is a nocturnal specialist filmed extracting a grub with its spindly middle finger. The programme ends with a sequence on ring-tailed lemurs which form larger communities and spend more time on the ground than other lemurs. They have strictly hierarchical societies led by the females, who will even attack intruders as their babies cling to their backs.

=== 2. "Monkeys" ===
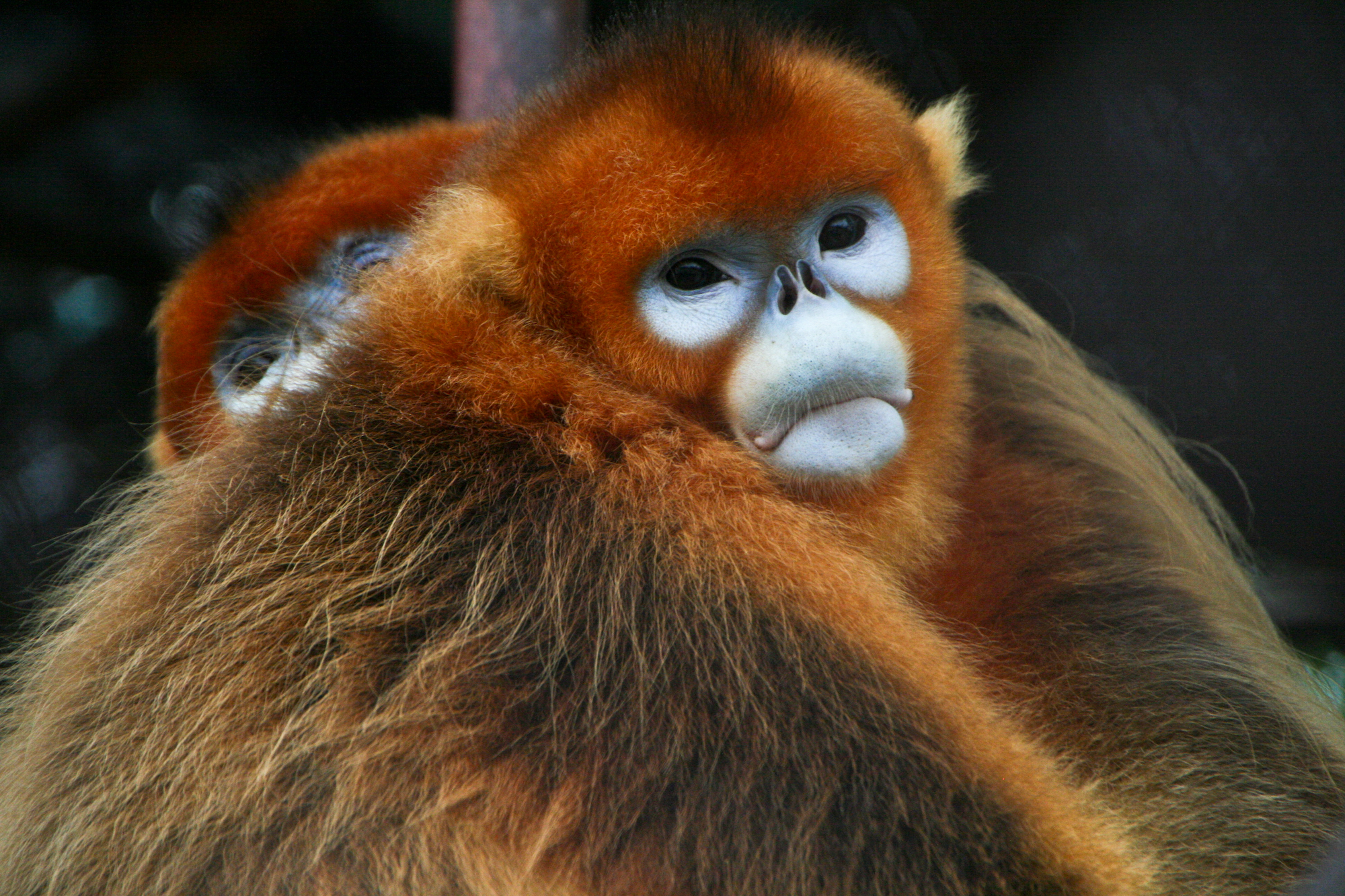
The endangered golden snub-nosed monkey is found only in China

Featured monkey species:

- Gelada baboon (Ethiopia)
- Marmoset (South America)
- Tamarin (South America)
- Pygmy marmoset (South America)
- Tassle-eared marmoset (South America)
- Spider monkey (Central and South America)
- Squirrel monkey (Central and South America)
- Black howler monkeys (South America)
- Black-and-white colobus (East Africa)
- Red colobus (Zanzibar)
- Diana monkey (West Africa)
- Proboscis monkey (South East Asia)
- Silvered monkey (Malaysia)
- Douc langur (Vietnam)
- Golden monkey (central China)
- Patas monkey (Africa)
- Olive baboon (Africa)

Uhlenbroek introduces the second episode from amongst gelada baboons in the Simien Mountains of Ethiopia, demonstrating how monkeys are athletic, adaptable and social animals. The smallest monkeys are the marmosets and tamarins of South America and are unusual amongst primate because the fathers do most of the parenting. The pygmy marmoset and tassle-eared marmoset are shown. Other New World species are shown: spider monkeys, squirrel monkeys and black howler monkeys. Uhlenbroek calls to the howlers and ascends into the canopy to view them at close quarters. Monkeys originated in the Old World, and it is here that the greatest diversity of species are found. The black-and-white colobus of East Africa are leaf-eaters. Leaves contain many toxins, but the red colobus of Zanzibar have found an antidote in the form of charcoal. Diana monkeys belong to the guenons, a shy group of monkeys from the West African jungles. The patchwork jungle has led to many different species of guenon evolving. In South East Asia, the proboscis monkey eats tough mangrove leaves which it digests by fermentation. The langurs are another leaf-eating group: silvered monkeys from Malaysia, douc langurs from Vietnam and the rare golden monkeys of central China are all shown. Back in Africa, Uhlenbroek explains that it is the monkeys that have come out of the forest to live on the ground that are the most intelligent and have the most sophisticated societies as shown by the patas monkey and olive baboon.

=== 3. "Apes" ===
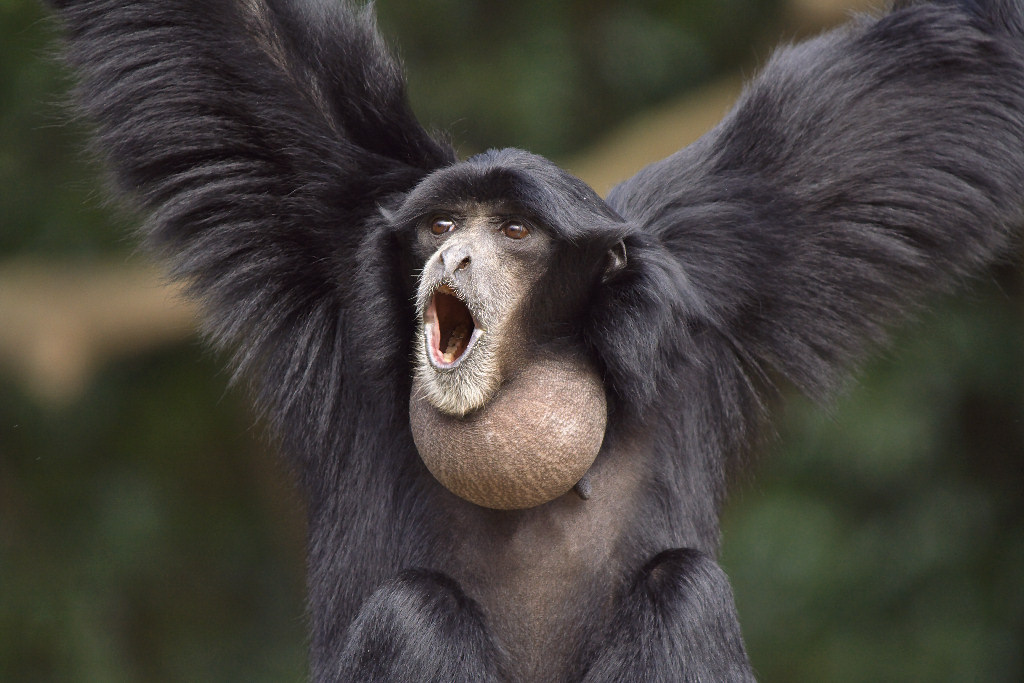
A male siamang vocalising

The final episode begins in the rainforest canopy of South East Asia, home to the smallest of the apes, the gibbons. A white-handed gibbon female sings a duet with her mate. Gibbons share with us flexible wrist and rotating shoulder joints, allowing them to swing under branches. Siamangs are the largest of the gibbons and combine their songs with a swinging dance. Humans share many other attributes with the great apes; strong family ties, intelligence, curiosity, reflection and the ability to manipulate our environment. In Borneo, orangutans spend most of their time feeding in the trees. They use up to 20% of their energy to fuel their large brains, and a large brain is essential to learn the skills they need to survive in the forest, a process that takes several years. In Africa, Uhlenbroek sits amongst a group of mountain gorillas. In scenes reminiscent of David Attenborough's gorilla encounter in Life on Earth, one of the adolescent male gorillas chooses to make physical contact by buffeting her. She attributes this behaviour to "showing off". In Gombe, chimpanzees are filmed using sticks as tools, and in Guinea another group has learned how to crack nuts with stones. Their human characteristics extend to affectionate hugs and kisses, but they have a dark side too, attacking and killing their own kind. Bonobos (pygmy chimpanzees) use sex to control their aggressive nature. Humans as the most successful apes have left our primate cousins far behind: we have language, technology, religion and a thirst for knowledge.

In the forest, the great apes nurtured a powerful mind, but all these apes were left far behind by one of their cousins. Another ape came out of the forest and stood upright. It developed language, imagination and a capacity to use tools so extraordinary that it was eventually able to control its environment. That ape was, of course, ourselves. Now our quest is to search new frontiers beyond our planet. As we push forward to explore the solar system and the stars and try to discover the origins of the universe, perhaps from time to time we should reflect on our own origins, our connection with the animal world and our primate cousins.

— Charlotte Uhlenbroek's closing narration

== Merchandise ==
A book and VHS tape were both released to accompany the TV series. The video is now out of print but is widely available second-hand.

The accompanying hardcover book, Cousins: Our Primate Relatives by Robin Dunbar and Louise Barrett, was published by BBC Books on 15 September 2000 (ISBN 0-563-55115-1).
