= Rachel Hogan =

British environmentalist

Rachel Hogan OBE
- Born: 21 April 1975 (age 51); Birmingham, England, U.K.
- Known for: Conservation of gorillas and chimpanzees, bushmeat activism
- Awards: IFAW Animal Action Award

Rachel Hogan OBE (born 1976), is a British primate conservationist, living and working in Cameroon in West Africa, and director of the charity Ape Action Africa.

Having moved to the Mefou National Park in Cameroon temporarily in 2001, Hogan decided to stay and has been there ever since, becoming director of the charity in 2010. She is well known for her work in the rescue and rehabilitation of gorillas and chimpanzees, as well as fighting the illegal bush meat trade in West Africa.

== Biography ==
Rachel Hogan was born in Birmingham, England and her interest in animals started during her childhood, when she had toy gorillas instead of dolls.

=== Manager at Mefou National Park ===
In 2003, Hogan was appointed manager of the National Park. During her tenure, she and her team have transformed Mefou into one of the largest, most well known primate conservation charities in Africa.

In October 2008, Hogan was awarded the IFAW Animal Action Award at a ceremony at the House of Lords. The IFAW awards ceremony was hosted by patron Baroness Gale and wildlife TV presenter Shauna Lowry announced the winners.

Having attracted several celebrities and renowned wildlife photographers to visit the Mefou National Park, Hogan organised a photographic exhibition at the Djeuga Palace Hotel in Yaounde in early October 2010. It was attended by Cameroonian Government Ministers, military heads and representatives from the British, US and Israeli embassies.

Hogan has also mobilized support for Ape Action Africa through events in Britain.

=== Director of Ape Action Africa ===
On 22 November 2010, the longstanding director of Ape Action Africa, Avi Sivan, was killed in a helicopter crash between Douala and Yaounde in Cameroon. Sivan had long been a driving force within the charity and a close ally of Hogan. Just over a month later, the board of trustees of the charity announced Rachel Hogan as the new Director. They also appointed Bibila Tafon (Babs) as the new Manager of the Mefou National Park.

One of Hogan's first moves was to bring the administrative offices of the charity back to the Mefou National Park from Yaounde, to improve communications between the conservation efforts and administrative necessities of the charity.

=== Bush meat activism and education ===
Hogan has campaigned against the illegal poaching and selling of rain forest animal species for many years - and particularly the exploitation of chimpanzees and gorillas in this way.

Many of the communities living around Cameroon have hunted primates for meat for centuries, but the recent commercialization of the trade has led to a large increase in the demand for bush meat, a trend that Hogan has been fighting at many levels.

Hogan has introduced a grassroots educational program, in which local charity workers visit communities and schools to teach about bush meat.

Local employment at Ape Action Africa has also helped to spread the message, as well as benefiting the community.

In February 2010, bush meat was discovered on a market in Hogan's hometown, Birmingham and identified as chimpanzee meat.

== Media and public speaking ==
=== Television ===
- 200' Going Ape: Animal Planet
- 2007 Going Ape 2: Animal Planet

=== Media ===
- 19 November 2006 "A Day in the Life of Rachel Hogan": Sunday Times
- 24 October 2008 "BBC - Gorilla fascination started young": BBC News
- 30 May 2010 "Reuters - Cameroon's gorillas find sanctuary": Reuters
- 6 March 2011 "From Birmingham to the jungles of Cameroon: How Rachel Hogan became the new Dian Fossey" Daily Mirror
- 11 March 2011 "Birmingham woman's fight to save gorillas from hunters": Birmingham Mail
- 25 May 2012 "African monkey meat that could be behind the next HIV": The Independent
- 3 August 2014 "I taught him to laugh! Brit saves gorilla after poacher attack": Express
- 2 July 2016 "100 Places That Will Change Your Life": National Geographic
- 30 August 2016 "Touching Photo Captures the Moment a Traumatized Baby Chimp Felt Safe for the First Time": One Green Planet
- 4 May 2017 "A Baby Gorilla's Mom Was Killed, So This Woman Raised Him": National Geographic
- 9 July 2017 "Rachel's Promise. Negli occhi dei gorilla – Di Jo-Anne McArthur": L'Adigetto

=== Public speaking ===
- 4 December 2009 "My life with gorillas": Bristol Zoo
- 7 October 2011 Leigh Court, Bristol
- 14 October 2011 Royal Geographical Society, London
- 29 April 2017 Dominican University, San Rafael, California
- 6 May 2017 Midpen Media Centre, Palo Alto, California
- 12 May 2017 University of Toronto, Toronto, Canada
- 13 May 2017 Framing Dames, Scarborough, Ontario, Canada
- 19 May 2017 Spacesmith, New York City
- 22 May 2017 The Explorers Club, New York City

== See also ==
- Ape Action Africa
