= Mefou National Park =

Primate sanctuary in Cameroon

Mefou Park
- French: Parc de la Méfou; Mefou Wildlife Sanctuary; Mfou Reserve
- Location within Cameroon
- Location: Méfou-et-Afamba, Centre Region, Cameroon
- Nearest town: Mfou
- Coordinates: 3°57′36″N 11°55′48″E

Mefou Park (French: Parc de la Méfou), also known as Mefou Wildlife Sanctuary and Mfou Reserve, is a primate sanctuary in the forested area of Mfou in Cameroon. Within it, Mefou Primate Park is used as a shelter for primates that are native to Africa such as various Old World monkeys, chimpanzees and Western lowland gorillas.

== History ==
Ape Action Africa established the sanctuary to house primates which were housed at the Mvog-Betsi Zoo at Yaoundé. Eventually, it would act to protect primates that were affected by illegal pet and bushmeat trades in the country.

In 2010, the sanctuary's director, Colonel Avi Sivan, was killed in a helicopter crash.

== Gallery ==
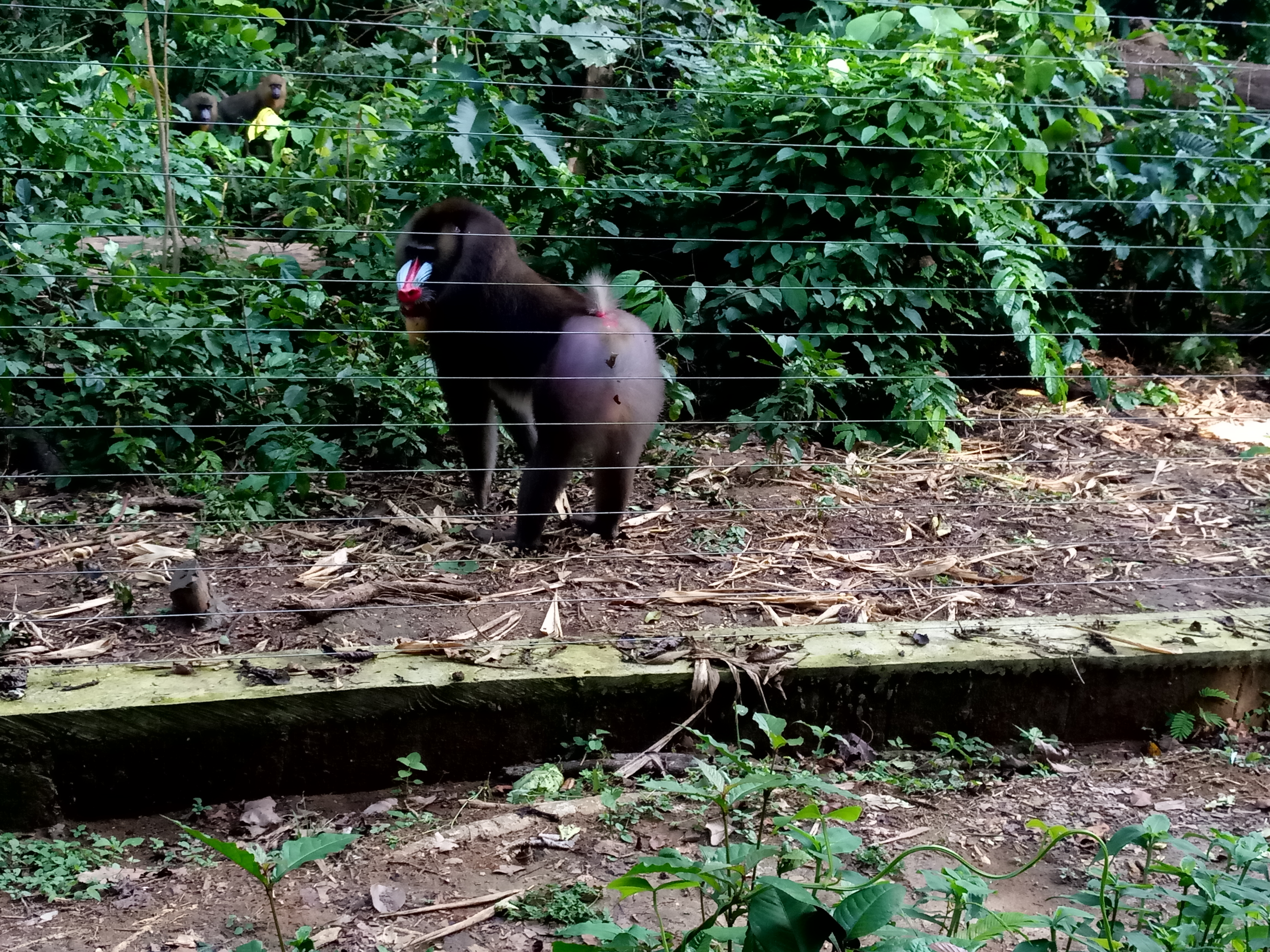
Mandril

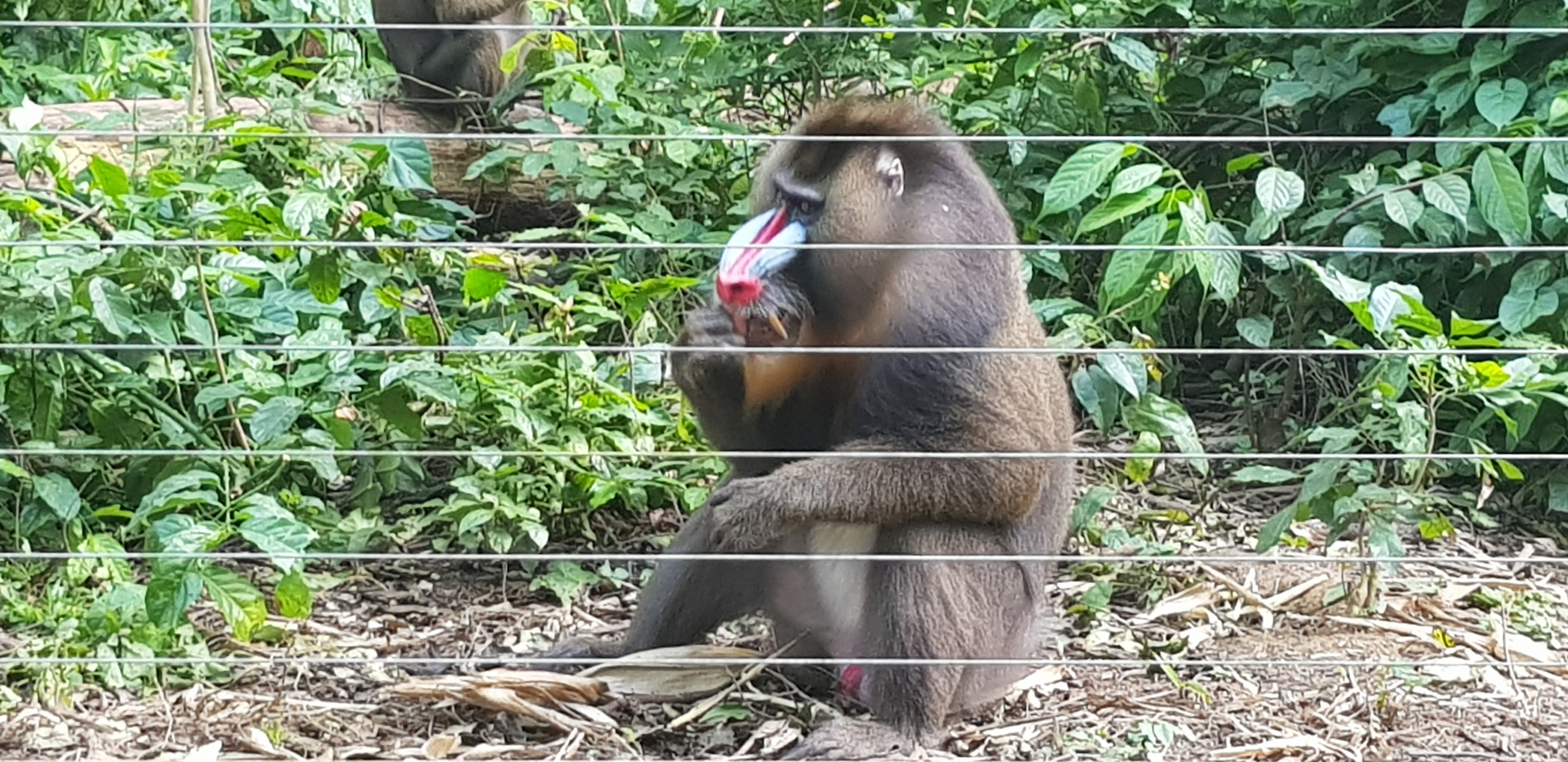
Adult Mandril

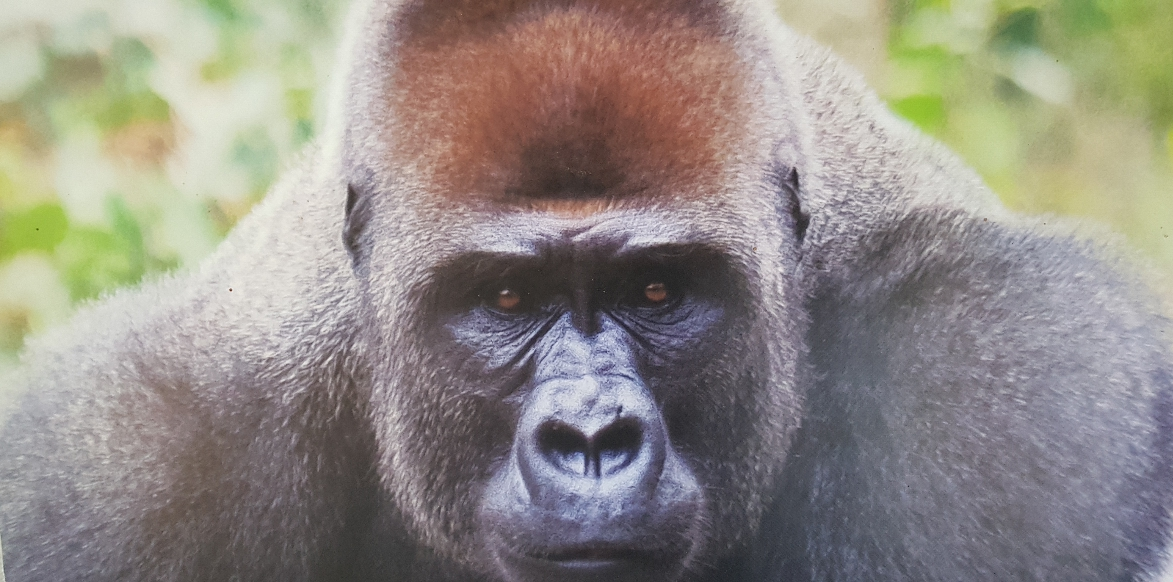
Adult gorilla with silverback

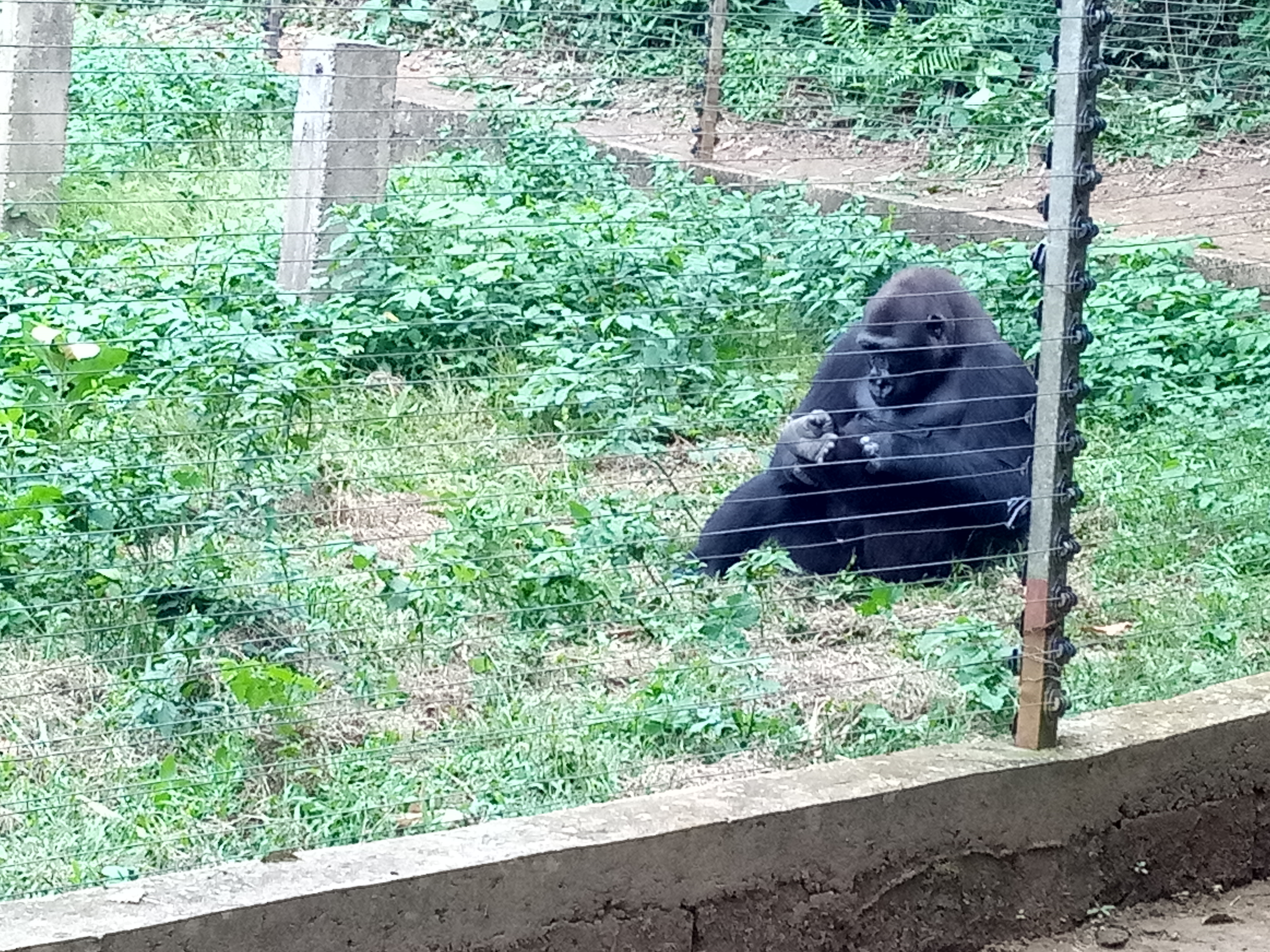
Female gorilla

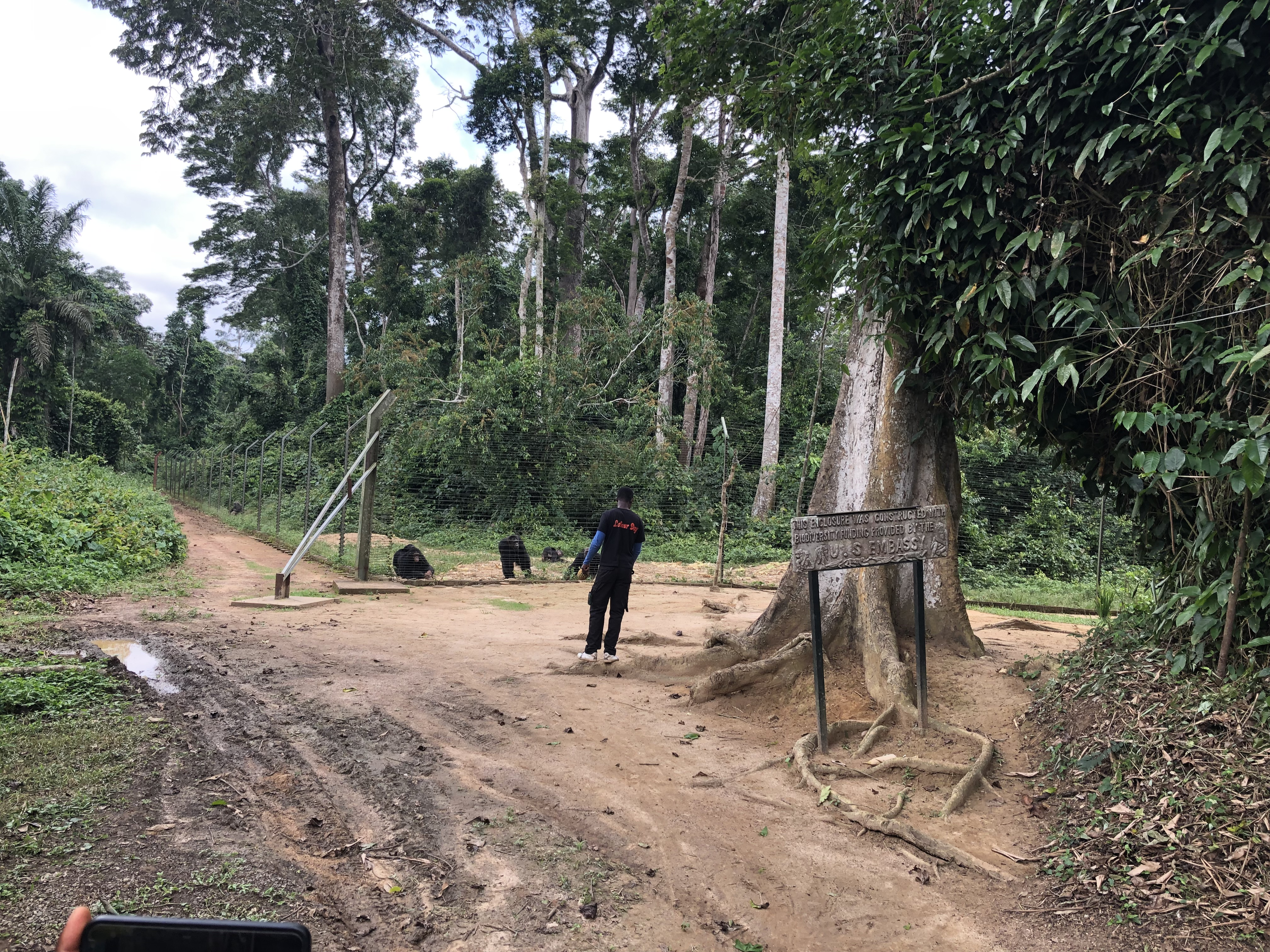
Entrance to the park

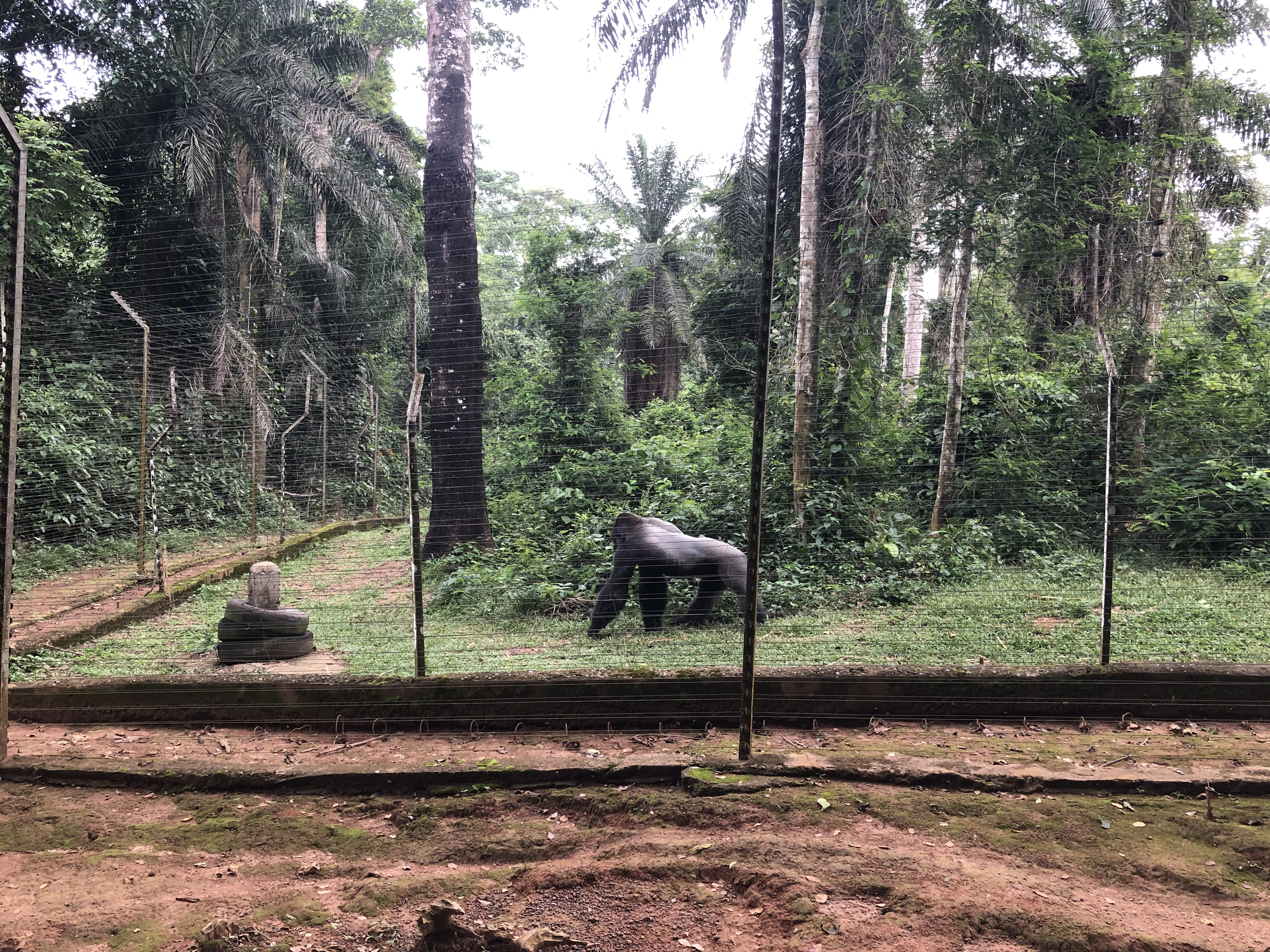
Trees at the park

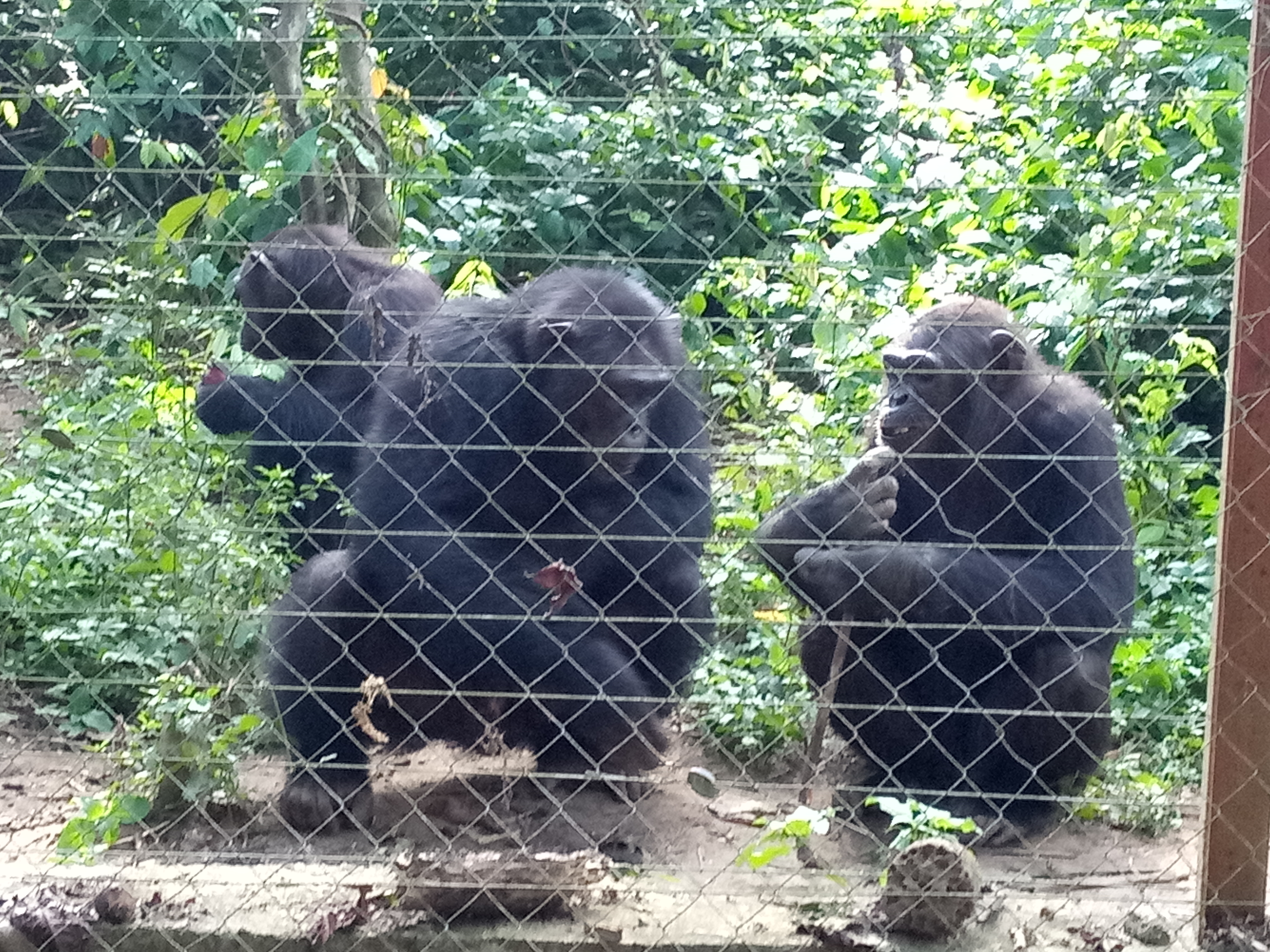
Confined Chimpanzees at Mefou

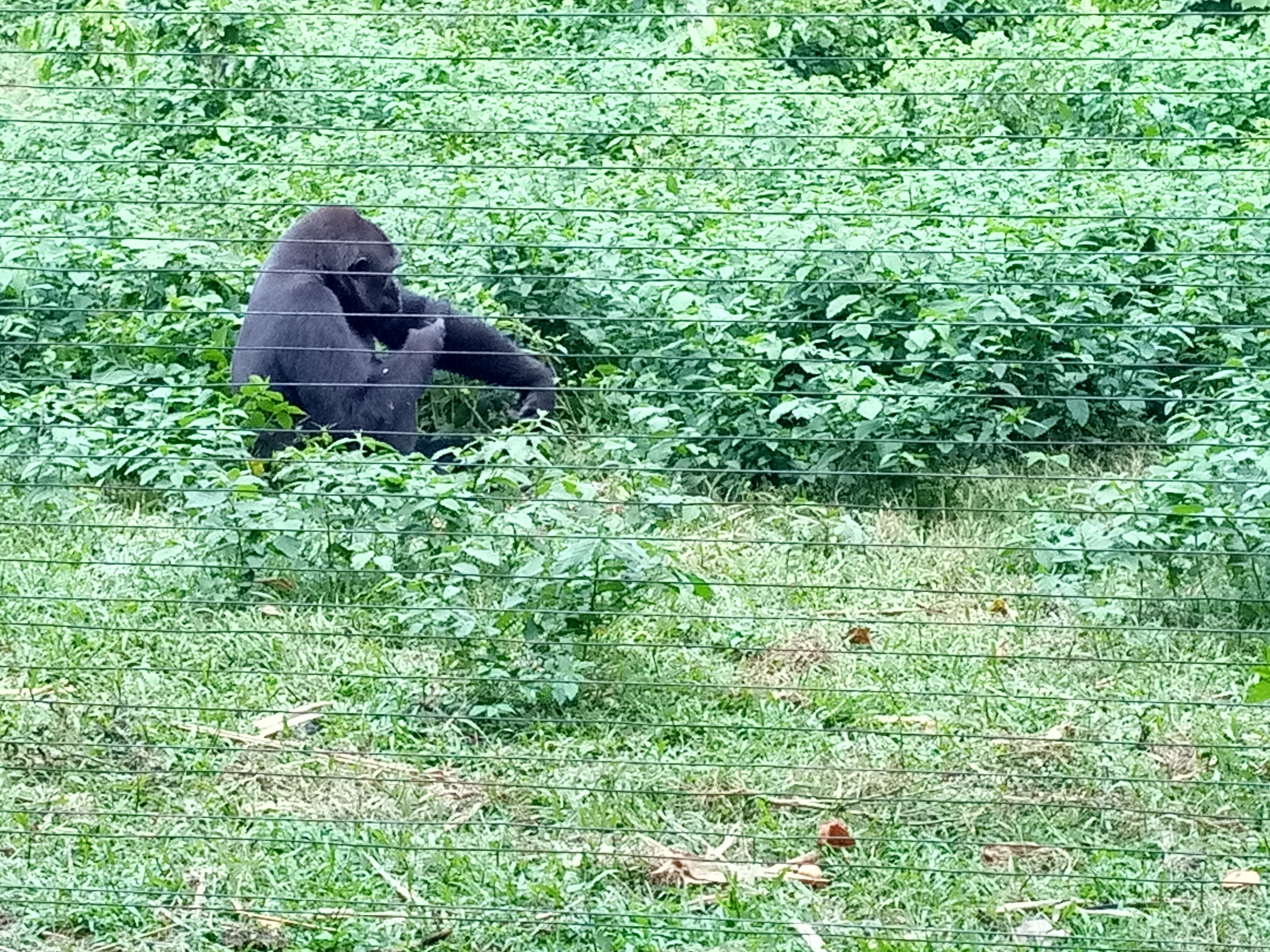
Adult female Gorilla

== See also ==
- Mpem and Djim National Park
- Tourism in Cameroon
- Wildlife of Cameroon
