= Mvog-Betsi Zoo =

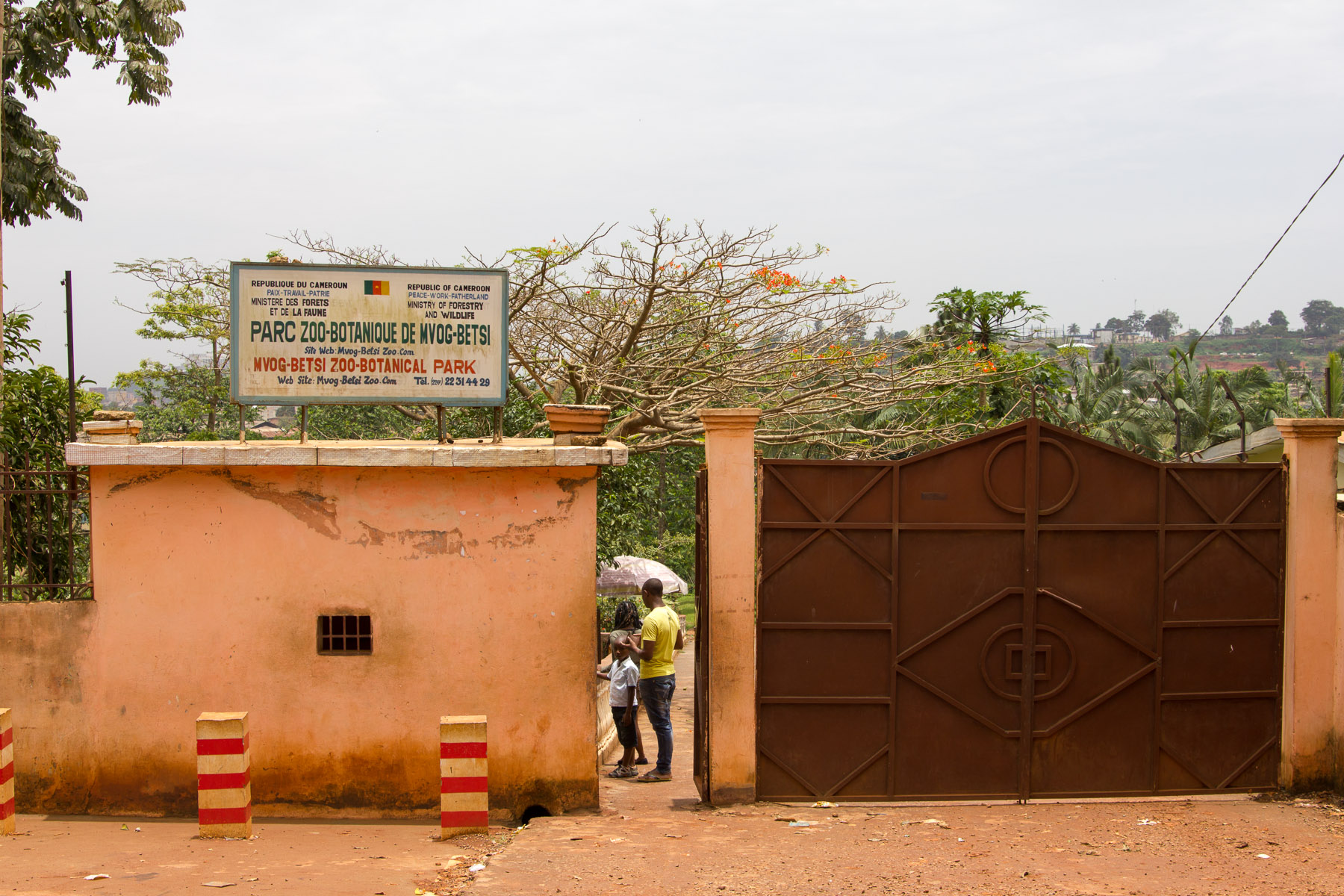
- Entrance to the zoo
- Interactive map of Mvog-Betsi Zoo
- 3.8649°N 11.48751°E
- Location: Yaoundé, Cameroon

The Mvog-Betsi Zoo (French: Parc zoo-botanique de Mvog Betsi) is a botanical and zoological park located in Yaoundé, Cameroon. It is administered by the country's Ministry of Forestry and Fauna (MINFOF) (formerly the Ministry of Environments and Forests (MINEF)), and there is a wide range of species at the zoo, including big cats, reptiles, and birds of prey. Ape Action Africa has taken responsibility for the care of the primates at the zoo.

== Fauna ==
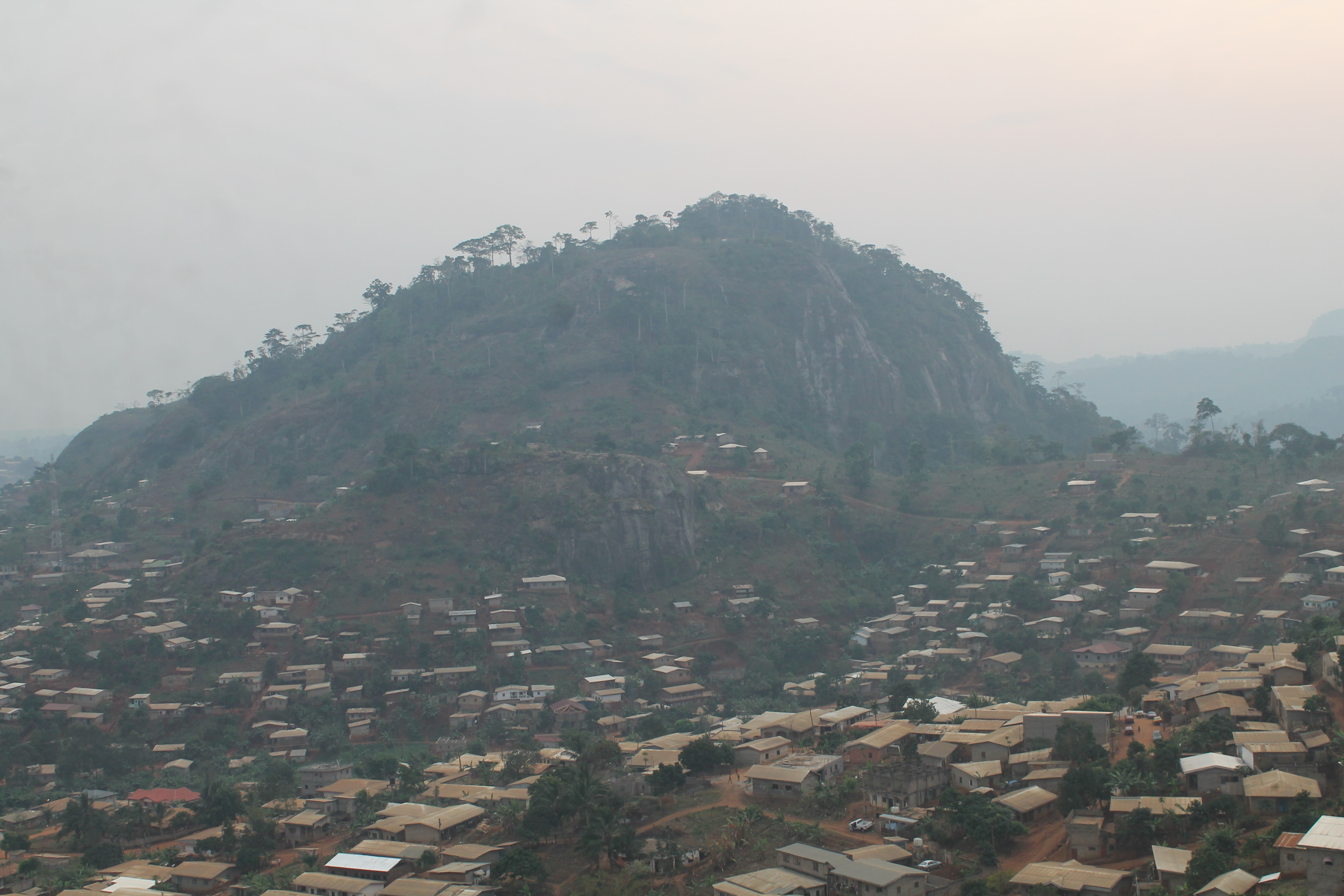
Yaoundé Mvog Bétsi

- Agile mangabey
- Baboon
- De Brazza's monkey
- Drill
- Grey-cheeked mangabey
- Mandrill
- Tantalus monkey
- Patas monkey
- Putty-nosed monkey
- Red-capped mangabey
- Lion

== See also ==
- Mefou National Park
