= Afanloum =

Coordinates: 4.6298°N 11.7068°E

- Commune and town
- Interactive map of Afanloum
- Country: Cameroon
- Region: Centre
- Department: Méfou-et-Afamba

Population (2005)
  - Total: 1,787
- Time zone: UTC+1 (WAT)

Afanloum is a town and commune in the Méfou-et-Afamba department, Centre Region of Cameroon. As of 2005 census, it had a population of 1,787.

== See also ==
- Communes of Cameroon
