= Claire King =

English actress (b. 1962)

- Born: Jayne Claire Seed; 10 January 1962 (age 64); Bradford, West Riding of Yorkshire, England
- Occupation: Actress
- Years active: 1982–present
- Television: Emmerdale; Bad Girls; Strictly Come Dancing; Safari School; Celebrity Big Brother; Coronation Street; Loose Women
- Spouse: Peter Amory (m. 1994; sep. 2004)

Jayne Claire King (born Jayne Claire Seed; 10 January 1962) is an English actress. She is known for her roles as Kim Tate in the ITV soap opera Emmerdale from 1989-1999 and 2018-Present, and as Karen Betts in Bad Girls from 2000 to 2004. She has appeared in the fourth series of Strictly Come Dancing in 2006, Safari School in 2007, and Celebrity Big Brother 14 in 2014. She also played Erica Holroyd in Coronation Street from 2014 until 2017.

== Early life and early career ==
King grew up in Harrogate with her brother and sister. King attended Harrogate Ladies College and chose a career in the music business as a disc jockey in a Leeds nightclub. She then managed, sang, and played keyboards in the Alternative Pop group Fidei and later To Be Continued as lead singer.

== Career ==
In 1987, King played a role in the film Eat the Rich. In 1988, King appeared in an episode of Wish Me Luck as a cinema usherette. In 1989, she appeared in the film Cold Light of Day as a prostitute. Soon afterwards, she joined the cast of the ITV soap opera Emmerdale as Kim Tate, a role she played for ten years before leaving the show in 1999. She had a role in an episode of Babes in the Wood as Angela. In 2000, she joined the cast of Bad Girls playing wing governor Karen Betts. She left the programme in 2004 after four years. In 2002, she appeared in an episode of Doctors as Jenny Hennessey in the episode "Into The Shadows". In 2004, King had a role in an episode of the sitcom Down to Earth as Paula Wakeman, and appeared in one episode of Dalziel and Pascoe as Louise Russell in the episode entitled: "Still Waters". Later that year, King played Madeline Jackson-Carter in four episodes of the hit drama TV show The Courtroom. In 2005, she appeared as Andrea Mason QC, a barrister for Justin Burton in six episodes of the Channel 4 soap opera Hollyoaks. She later appeared as Janice Perry in an episode of Holby City called "Not Another Car Wreck". She appeared in The Afternoon Play in the episode "The Good Citizen" as Joanna Clay, as well as Sally Parker in an episode of the TV series Donovan. In 2006, King participated in the fourth series of the BBC reality show Strictly Come Dancing; she finished in sixth place overall. King also appeared in five episodes of Hollyoaks: In The City as business woman Stella, and as Gina in an episode of Mayo in episode 1.7. In 2007, she was a contestant in the BBC Two reality-television show Safari School filmed in the South African bush where she finished in third place overall. King also appeared in two episodes of the TV show The Pyramid Game.

In 2008, King appeared in the medical drama The Royal as Lucy Bayliss, in the episode "Slings And Arrows". In the same year, she appeared as a panellist on the Channel 5 topical debate show The Wright Stuff for two episodes, and on The Alan Titchmarsh Show. She appeared in the documentary Emmerdale 50000, which celebrated five thousand episodes of the TV programme. King has appeared on lunch time chat show Loose Women several times as a guest. She was a guest panellist in 2012 to mark 40 years of Emmerdale, and returned in August 2017 for two further guest panellist appearances. She has also appeared on day-time TV Show This Morning several times. In 2010, King appeared and starred in the BBC Three sitcom The Gemma Factor as Betsy. King appeared in the topical debate show The Wright Stuff on Channel 5 as a panellist for one episode. She later went on a UK and Ireland tour of the comedy play The Naked Truth along with Liberty X singer Michelle Heaton. In 2012, she appeared as a prison governor in an episode of Hollyoaks. She had a role in the film The Wedding Video as Gina. She appeared in the documentary Emmerdale at 40: The Headline Makers marking 40 years of the soap opera. In 2013, she appeared as Geraldine Worthing in an episode of the BBC medical drama Casualty and appeared in two episodes of Daybreak. King has appeared in several pantomime productions, including Jack and the Beanstalk and Snow White. In 2014, she appeared in an episode of Pointless in a Soap-Star special edition. She also appeared in the Channel 5 documentary TV's Nastiest Villains, presented by actress and author Joan Collins.

King entered the Celebrity Big Brother house on 18 August 2014 to compete in the fourteenth series, but left the show on Day 16 due to illness. She appeared twice on Big Brother's Bit on the Side. In October 2014, she appeared in an episode of Who's Doing the Dishes?. In November 2014, she appeared in an episode of the E4 comedy show Drifters as Cath. In December 2014, she joined the cast of the soap opera Coronation Street as character Erica Holroyd, a role she portrayed until 2017. On 24 September 2018, it was announced that King would reprise her role as Emmerdale character Kim Tate, after nearly 20 years away, for a special week of episodes from 8 October 2018. On 12 October 2018, it was confirmed that King would return permanently in 2019.

== Personal life ==
In 1994, King married actor Peter Amory, who played her on-screen stepson Chris Tate in Emmerdale. They separated in 2004. King currently lives near Harrogate, with her horses and Labrador dogs.

== Filmography ==
Year	Title	Role	Notes
1987	Eat the Rich	Yuppie Bitch	Film role
1988	Wish Me Luck	Cinema Usherette	Series 1: Episode 2
1989	Cold Light of Day	Prostitute	Film
1989–1999, 2018–2028	Emmerdale	Kim Tate	Series regular
1999	Babes in the Wood	Angela	Series 2: Episode 7
2000–2004	Bad Girls	Karen Betts	Series regular; 56 episodes
2001–2020	This Morning	Herself	11 episodes
2002	Doctors	Jenny Hennessey	Episode: "Into The Shadows"
2003–2018	Loose Women	Herself; guest panellist	15 episodes
2004	Down to Earth	Paula Wakeman	Episode: "Still Waters"
2004	Dalziel and Pascoe	Louise Russell	Episode: "The Price of Fame"
2004	The Courtroom	Madeline Jackson-Carter	4 episodes
2005	Holby City	Janice Perry	Episode: "Not Another Car Wreck"
2005	The Afternoon Play	Joanna Clay	Episode: "The Good Citizen"
2005	DNA	Sally Parker	Series 2: Episode 2
2005	Hollyoaks	Andrea Mason QC	6 episodes
2006	Mayo	Gina Harper	Series 1: Episode 7
2006	Hollyoaks: In The City	Stella	5 episodes
2006	Strictly Come Dancing	Herself	Contestant; 6th place
2007	All Star Family Fortunes	Herself	Contestant; 1 episode
2007	Safari School	Herself	Contestant; 3rd place
2007	The Pyramid Game	Herself	2 episodes
2008	The Royal	Lucy Bayliss	Episode: "Slings And Arrows"
2010	The Gemma Factor	Betty	Main cast; all 6 episodes
2012	Hollyoaks	Governor	1 episode
2012	The Wedding Video	Gina	Film
2013	Casualty	Geraldine Worthing	Episode: "With And Without You"
2013	Daybreak	Herself	Guest; 2 episodes
2014	Pointless	Herself	Participant; 1 episode
2014	Celebrity Big Brother 14	Herself	Housemate; contestant
2014	Big Brother's Bit on the Side	Herself	2 episodes; former housemate
2014	Drifters	Cath	Episode: "Hen Don't"
2014–2017	Coronation Street	Erica Holroyd	Series regular; 156 episodes
2015	A Reason to Leave	Sarah	Film

== Awards and nominations ==
Year	Ceremony	Category	Work	Result
1999	The British Soap Awards	Best Exit	Emmerdale	Won
2002	TV Quick Awards	Best Actress	Bad Girls	Won
2003	TV Quick Awards	Best Actress	Bad Girls	Won
2019	The British Soap Awards	Villain of the Year	Emmerdale	Nominated
2020	TV Choice Awards	Best Soap Actress	Emmerdale	Nominated
