= KAT Centre =

Animal welfare organisation

Kathmandu Animal Treatment Centre of Nepal (KAT Centre Nepal)
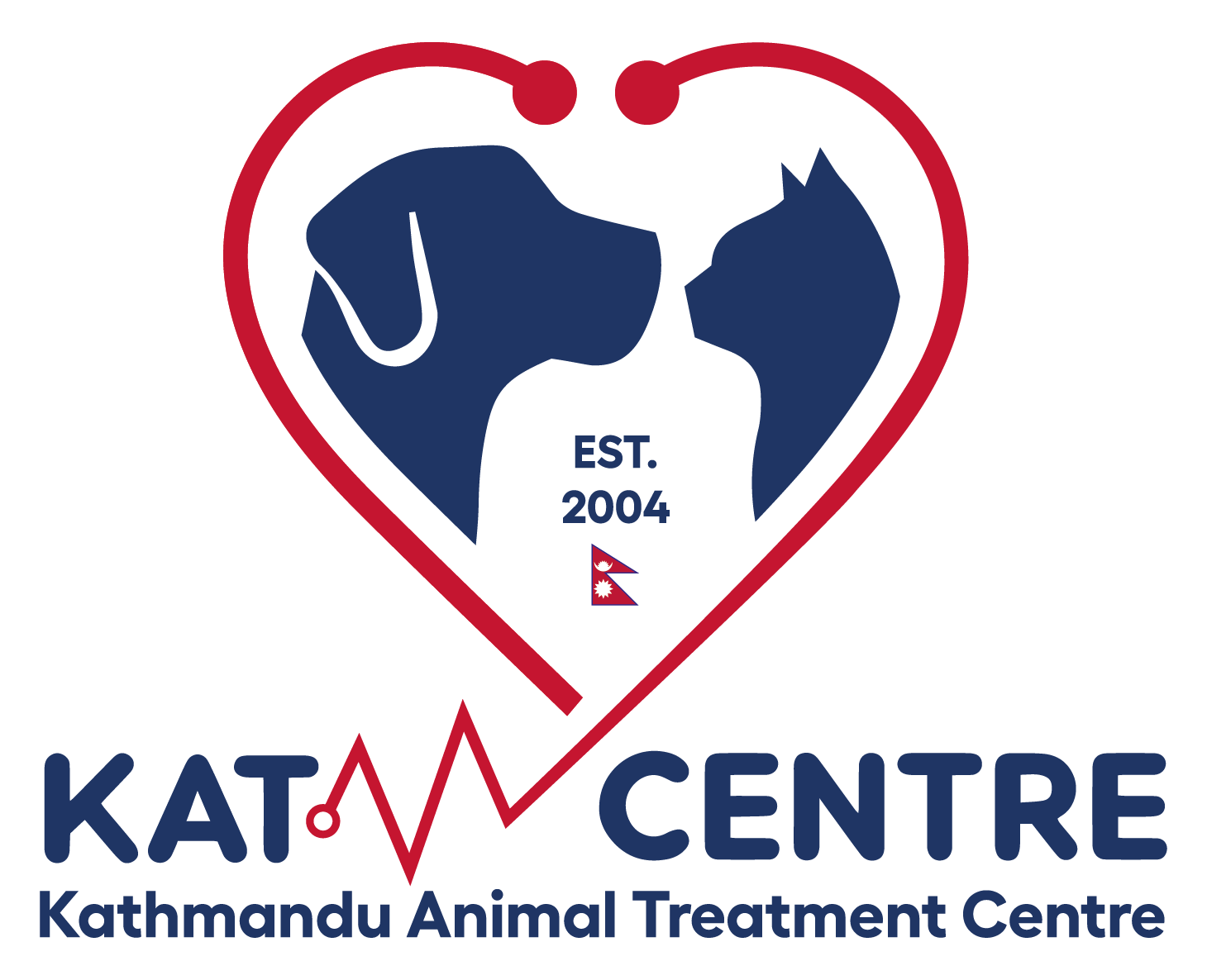
- Official Logo of KAT Centre Nepal
- Founded: 2004, Kathmandu, Nepal
- Purpose: Charity
- Location: Bande Pakha 2, Budanilkantha, GPO Box 8975, EPC 4120, Kathmandu, Nepal
- Region served: Nepal
- Website: www.katcentre.org

The KAT Centre Nepal (Kathmandu Animal Treatment Centre of Nepal) is a nonprofit organization in Nepal. The KAT Centre Nepal’s goals are to create a healthy, sustainable street dog population, reduce animal cruelty, and eliminate rabies, around Kathmandu, Nepal.

The Kathmandu Animal Treatment Centre Nepal was first conceived after Jan Salter visited the organization Help in Suffering in Jaipur, India. Impressed with the way this and other animal welfare organizations have managed difficult street dog problems and eliminated rabies through Animal Birth Control (ABC) and widespread rabies vaccinations, Ms. Salter came back to Nepal convinced that Kathmandu can become a rabies-free, dog-friendly city. The KAT Centre Nepal was registered as a non-profit charitable animal welfare organization in 2003, and officially opened its doors on 9 May 2004. The organization's patron is Dr. Charlotte Uhlenbroek.

The KAT Centre Nepal depends on donations from people and foundations throughout the world to support its programs. It receives almost no support from the government of Nepal.

KAT USA was founded in 2021 as an IRS approved US Non-Profit 501(c)3 in the United States. KAT USA was established with the only purpose of providing funding to KAT Centre Nepal.

== Animal birth control (ABC) ==
The Kathmandu Animal Treatment Centre's main program is Animal Birth Control (ABC). Concentrating on an area of the city at a time, staff picks up female stray dogs and take them to the KAT Centre. Each dog is registered by the veterinary staff, who record its health and the neighborhood from where it was picked up. After being allowed to settle for 12 to 24 hours, the dog is treated for existing health problems, vaccinated against rabies, sterilized (spayed), and given an ear mark to indicate that it has been treated.

Around three days after the surgery, KAT's veterinarians confirm the animals are healthy and the staff returns them to their own territories. With KAT's current facilities, 100 to 120 female stray dogs are sterilized, vaccinated for rabies, de-wormed and treated for existing illness or injury each month.

The organization is methodically applying this approach to the entire urban area of Kathmandu – sterilizing and vaccinating every female street dog possible in a neighborhood, then moving the program to an adjacent area. This has been demonstrated in many cities to be the most effective, humane, and sustainable way to manage a street dog population.

== Rescue and treatment ==
As the Kathmandu Animal Treatment Centre implements its Animal Birth Control program in a neighborhood, it also rescues sick, injured, and abused stray cats and dogs in the same area and gives them necessary medical care. Additionally, people call to ask the organization to help street dogs and cats in distress, and they frequently bring animals to the Centre who need emergency treatment or were abandoned. KAT actively seeks adopters for animals who lack a suitable environment to return to.

== Humane education ==
The KAT Centre's animal care is complemented by its Humane Education program, primarily in the same neighborhood where the other programs are operating. Through school visits, distributing leaflets, inviting schools and other groups to visit the Centre, and conducting outreach activities, KAT encourages communities to care for local street dogs, sterilize their pets (many of whom live outdoors where they can easily breed), and call KAT when they see animals who need help. The goals of the Humane Education program are to reduce animal cruelty and improve care for animals (pets as well as street animals) in Nepal.

== Additional programs ==
In addition to Animal Birth Control, Rescue & Treatment, and Humane Education, the KAT Centre conducts Pet Therapy in schools for disabled children and orphanages in Kathmandu. KAT's staff uses very gentle dogs to provide emotional healing to needy youth. The organization also actively seeks adopters for the long-term resident dogs and cats at its Centre. The KAT Centre encourages volunteers from technical backgrounds such as veterinarians and vet nurses, as well as people with no animal care experience. Volunteers play an essential role at the Centre and generally report that they have very rewarding experiences.

== Impact of programs ==
Since the Kathmandu Animal Treatment Centre was founded, it has sterilised more than 31,000 street dogs and vaccinated over 48,000. As a result, a 2010 survey (conducted by the government of Nepal, the World Society for the Protection of Animals (Now known as World Animal Protection), and the KAT Centre) revealed that 40% of the female street dogs in the urban area of Kathmandu are now spayed and the canine population decreased from approximately 31,000 to 22,500.

Furthermore, according to the 2010 survey, where KAT operates, 71% of street dogs are healthy compared to 41% elsewhere in the Kathmandu Valley, and only 19% have skin disease (such as mange) compared to 82% elsewhere. People are more compassionate towards stray dogs in the areas where KAT works than in places its programs have not yet reached.

For decades, the government of Kathmandu has poisoned street dogs with strychnine in an attempt to reduce their population size. Strychnine poisoning causes prolonged painful convulsions before death. The KAT Centre has an agreement with the government to ensure this inhumane poisoning does not occur in KAT's working area, which is now the entire urban part of Kathmandu.
