= Awaé =

Coordinates: 3.8833°N 11.8833°E

- Commune and town
- Location in Cameroon
- Country: Cameroon
- Region: Centre
- Department: Méfou-et-Afamba
- Elevation: 764 m (2,507 ft)

Population (2005)
  - Total: 1,588
- Time zone: UTC+1 (WAT)

Awaé is a town and commune in Cameroon belonging to the Méfou-et-Afamba department of the Centre Region.

== See also ==
- Communes of Cameroon
