= Jan Salter =

Animal welfare activist

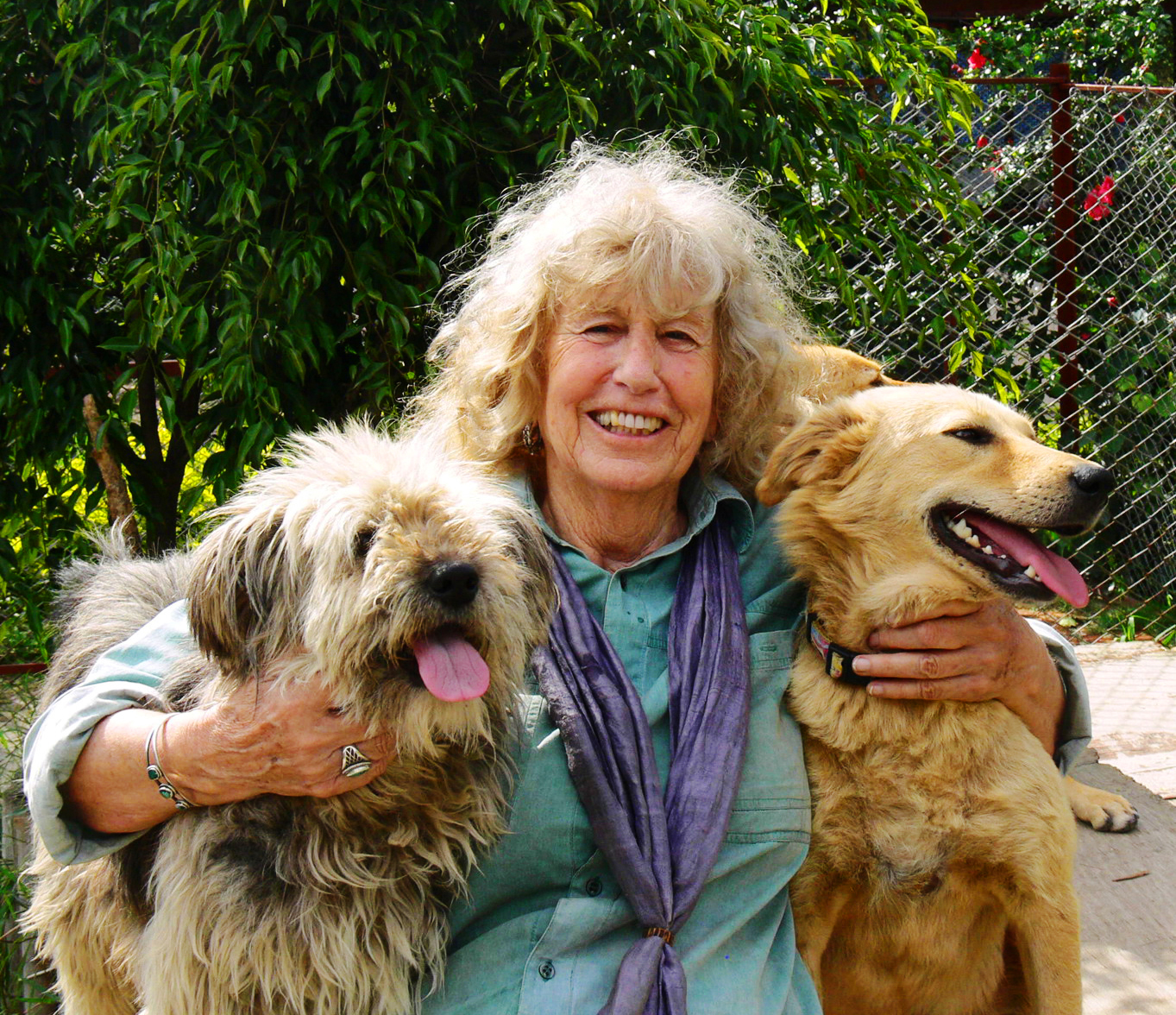
Jan Salter

Jan Salter MBE (1936 – 29 April 2018) was the founder of the Kathmandu Animal Treatment Centre (KAT Centre), a charity organisation that works to create a healthy, sustainable street dog population and eliminate rabies in Kathmandu, Nepal. She was also an artist who was widely acclaimed for her portraits of people of Nepal.

== Early life ==
Salter was born in Southampton, England in 1936. During her younger years, she travelled extensively throughout the world, often finding employment as a hairdresser in the countries she visited. This profession gave her the opportunity to earn income to support her travels.

Salter first visited the Himalayan country of Nepal in 1967 as a tourist. She was hired as a hairdresser in Boris Lisanevich's Royal Hotel, one of the first international hotels in the country. She continued to travel worldwide but no other country interested her like Nepal did. In 1975, she returned to Kathmandu, the capital of Nepal, where she lived until 2016.

At that time, Salter began to create pencil drawings of Nepali people. Although she had no formal training as an artist, her talent became apparent as she compiled a series of more than 100 drawings, and she later expanded into oil paintings as well. Salter trekked extensively throughout Nepal, often with her adopted Nepali son, Premlal, to produce portraits of the diverse ethnic groups who inhabit different regions of the country. She has enjoyed a successful career as an artist with many exhibitions of her work, and is still widely respected in Nepal and abroad for her representations of the country's many ethnicities. She was a great champion of the underdog (literally) and over the years helped and befriended many people many impoverished VSO volunteers and others including Jane Wilson-Howarth; Jan features in her travel memoir.

== Faces of Nepal ==
Salter collaborated with the scholar and author Dr. Harka Gurung on a book entitled "Faces of Nepal." The book is a unique ethnographic study of the various ethnic groups of Nepal which combines Gurung's writings about each ethnicity with Salter's drawings and paintings of members of the groups. The book was published in 1996 and received much critical acclaim.

In 1997 Salter was decorated with the "Gorkha Dakshin Bahu" award by the then Nepali king, Birendra Bir Bikram Shah Dev. She has worked with the organisation Maiti Nepal, which rescues Nepali girls who were trafficked and sold into prostitution. Salter produced a series of paintings entitled "All Our Daughters" of girls who had been rescued by Maiti Nepal.

== Kathmandu Animal Treatment Centre ==
Salter had long been disturbed by the suffering of the tens of thousands of street dogs in Kathmandu. Many are afflicted with malnutrition, injuries from collisions with vehicles, and infectious diseases. The government poisoned more than 10,000 street dogs every year with strychnine to attempt to reduce their population. While travelling in India in 2003, Salter visited an organisation called "Help in Suffering" in Jaipur that used spay/neuter surgeries to reduce the street dog population, an approach that was in its infancy in the developing world. Salter recognised that this can be applied on a large scale in Kathmandu and was immediately inspired to take action. At age 68, she stepped back from her career as an artist to devote her time to animal welfare.

Salter committed her life's financial savings to building and starting the Kathmandu Animal Treatment Centre (KAT Centre), the first organisation in Nepal working to improve the dog population. The KAT Centre was registered with the government of Nepal as a charity organisation in 2003 and opened on 9 May 2004. It continues to be the largest companion animal welfare organisation in Nepal.

The KAT Centre's goals are to humanely produce a healthy, stable street dog population and to eliminate rabies in Kathmandu. The core program engenders a sustainable reduction in the canine population through spay/neuter surgeries. KAT's staff collects female dogs to sterilise them and vaccinate them for rabies, while also providing needed veterinary treatment to street animals in the area.

Salter knew that to effect an enduring impact, she must transform people's attitudes about the dogs in their city. Therefore, the KAT Centre's animal care is complemented by an education program. KAT teaches children and adults about compassion for animals, street dog welfare, responsible pet ownership, and rabies awareness.

Salter's approach has produced a visible transformation in the city of Kathmandu, in the number of stray dogs, their health, and people's attitudes towards them. She was the driving force behind the organisation's long-term planning, guiding it towards its goals of creating a healthy, stable dog population and eliminating rabies in Kathmandu. As the public persona of the KAT Centre, Salter conducted much of the organisation's fundraising and donor relations.

In 2010 Salter received the prestigious "Extraordinary Commitment and Achievement award" presented by Humane Society International, and in the UK New Years Honours List for 2013 she received an MBE from Queen Elizabeth II for services to animal welfare in Nepal.

Jan died in Lyme Regis on 29 April 2018.
