= Safari School =

- Created by: BBC/Initial
- Starring: Charlotte Uhlenbroek and eight celebrities
- Country of origin: United Kingdom
- No. of episodes: Twenty

Production
- Running time: 30 minutes

Original release
- Network: BBC
- Release: 22 January – 16 February 2007

Safari School is a BBC Two reality television series presented by Dr Charlotte Uhlenbroek in which eight celebrities take part in a four-week ranger training course in the Shamwari Game Reserve in South Africa.

== Synopsis ==
The celebrities have to learn how to become game rangers. Every day they have to undertake tasks set by their instructors, both experienced rangers, and at the end of each week the two worst trainees face a head-to-head challenge to remain in Africa.

Each week, one of them has to go home until the fourth week when one leaves every day. When it gets down to the final two, each one has to take a group of three top conservationists on a game drive which might include changing a tyre or having to face down a charging elephant. The conservationists then decide the winner by judging who has learnt the most in four weeks of training and delivered the most convincing performance as a ranger. And then the winner gets to release two big cats, a lion and a leopard, into a new Born Free Foundation enclosure in the African bush.

== Contestants ==
The celebrities taking part are:

- Carrie Grant (vocal coach) -Winner
- Jeremy Sheffield (actor- Holby City) -Runner Up
- Claire King (actress- Emmerdale and Bad Girls) eliminated week four (day three)
- Jamie Baulch (athlete) eliminated week 4 (day two)
- Blair McDonough (actor- Neighbours) - Eliminated week 4 (Day One)
- Brooke Kinsella (actress- EastEnders) - Eliminated Week 3
- Jan Leeming (former newsreader) - Eliminated Week 2
- Paul Usher (actor- Brookside and The Bill) - Eliminated Week 1

== Safari School Instructors ==
- Andrew Kearney
- Graeme McLeod

== Production Team ==
- Paul Coueslant - Series Producer
- Sam Eastall, Rebecca Welsh, Holly Flynn - Producer-Directors
- Amy Mangion - Production Manager
- Nick Samwell-Smith - Executive Producer for Initial
- Alison Kirkham - Executive Producer for BBC
