= Edzendouan =

Coordinates: 4°12′N 11°45′E

- Commune and town
- Interactive map of Edzendouan
- Country: Cameroon
- Time zone: UTC+1 (WAT)

Edzendouan is a town and commune in Cameroon.

== See also ==
- Communes of Cameroon
