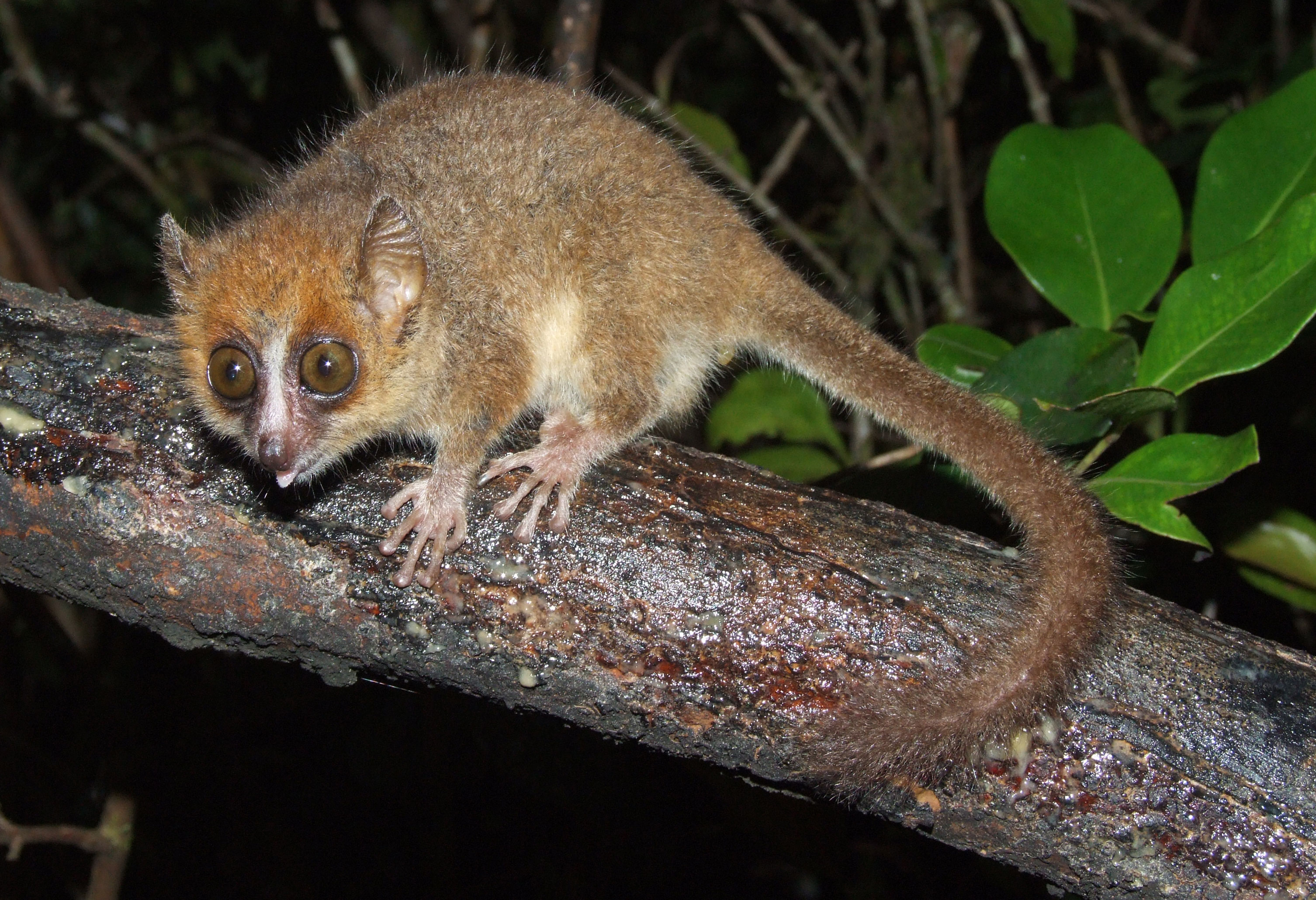

Conservation status
- Vulnerable (IUCN 3.1)
- CITES Appendix I

Scientific classification
- Kingdom: Animalia
- Phylum: Chordata
- Class: Mammalia
- Infraclass: Placentalia
- Order: Primates
- Suborder: Strepsirrhini
- Family: Cheirogaleidae
- Genus: Microcebus
- Species: M. myoxinus

Binomial name
- Microcebus myoxinus Peters, 1852
- Distribution of M. myoxinus

= Pygmy mouse lemur =

Species of lemur

The pygmy mouse lemur (Microcebus myoxinus), also known as Peters' mouse lemur or dormouse lemur, is a primate weighing only 43–55 g (1.5–1.9 oz); it is the second smallest of the mouse lemurs. Its dorsal side is a rufous-brown colour, and creamy-white ventrally. It lives in dry deciduous forests of western Madagascar. It has been captured in the Tsingy de Bemaraha Nature Reserve, the Andramasy forests north of Belo sur Tsiribihina, and the border of heavily degraded deciduous forest and savanna at Aboalimena. It has also been found in other habitats, in mangroves in two localities.

Accounts and descriptions of this species are frequently confounded with those of Microcebus berthae, the smallest primate in the world. This is because specimens of M. berthae captured in Kirindy Forest, 60 km north of Morondava, were erroneously named M. myoxinus. Apparently, the rufous color of M. berthae (not described at the time) matched the description by Peter as M. myoxinus. Most articles on the web report information on M. myoxinus that correspond to studies made in Kirindy Forest on M. berthae.

The behavior and ecology of Microcebus myoxinus remains to be studied in the wild.

The pygmy mouse lemur measures around 12–13 cm (4.7–5.1 in) (head-body length).

== Mating ==
During mating season, male pygmy mouse lemurs have a home range that is much larger than the home range of females. It has been seen that males typically roam long distances at night during mating season. Males also tend to be heavier than females during the mating season compared to the rest of the year. This indicates that the testes of male pygmy mouse lemurs grow a significant amount during the mating season. There is also evidence of male sperm competition, seen through sperm plugs in females which indicate the importance of prevention of additional matings in females.

== Hibernation ==
During the dry season, pygmy mouse lemurs enter a state of inactivity to save energy. This is possible for them in natural conditions when their body temperatures are below 28 °C (82 °F). Compared to males, female pygmy mouse lemurs are more likely to enter this type of hibernation which leads to a skewed sex ratio. However, when the pygmy mouse lemurs live in areas where the temperatures are relatively higher, the sex ratio is more balanced. This is because higher temperatures make it difficult for the lemurs to remain in hibernation for a long time. For those living in cooler temperatures, metabolic rates drop by about 86% compared to their normal metabolic rates.

== Genetics ==
For many years, pygmy mouse lemurs were not considered to be a different species when compared to other mouse lemurs. However, recently there have been studies that show that there are large genetic differences of the DNA. This made it evident that the pymgy mouse lemur could be classified into its own species, rather than being grouped with another species of mouse lemur. Even with these morphological differences found among the species of mouse lemurs, studies need to be done with a focus on chromosome variation of all the mouse lemur species.
