= Shamwari Game Reserve =

Game reserve outside Gqeberha, Eastern Cape, South Africa

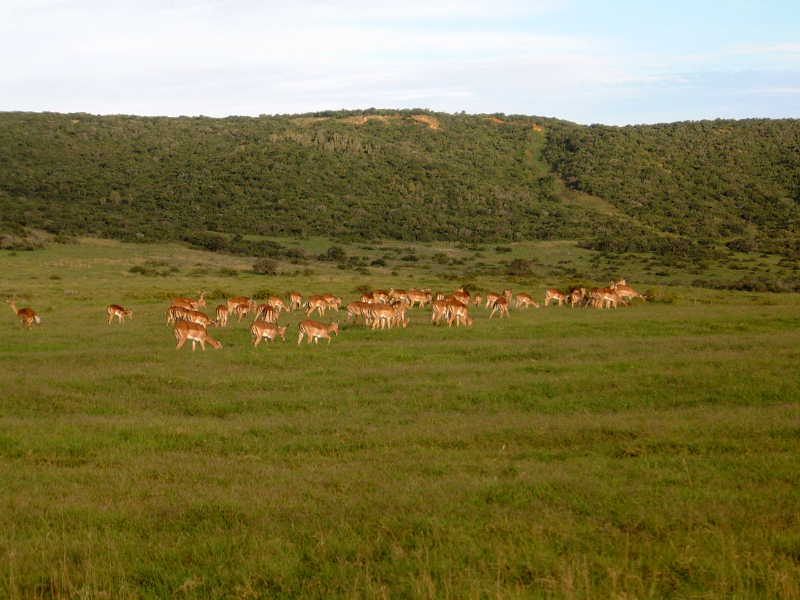
- A herd of impala grazing on Shamwari plains
- Location within Eastern Cape
- Location: Near Gqeberha, Eastern Cape, South Africa
- Coordinates: 33°28′42″S 26°02′07″E
- Area: 250 km^{2} (97 mi^{2})
- Established: 1992; 34 years ago
- Shamwari Game Reserve (South Africa) Shamwari Game Reserve (Eastern Cape)

Shamwari Game Reserve is located 75 km outside Gqeberha, Eastern Cape, South Africa. It is part of the Indalo Protected Environment.

The reserve focuses on the management, development and rehabilitation of an ecosystem that has been returned to a more natural condition after many years of agricultural farming.

== Wildlife ==
Animals such as the Big five game, hippopotamus, South African giraffe, Cape mountain zebra, Southeast African cheetah, wildebeest and hyena are present on the reserve.

== Awards and honours ==
In 2005 the reserve was awarded the Global Nature Fund Award for Best Conservation Practice.

== In popular culture ==
Shamwari Game Reserve was the subject of the 2018 Netflix reality TV series Shamwari Untamed. The British TV series Safari School and the Animal Planet series Shamwari: A wild life were also filmed at the reserve.

== Partner organisations ==
The Born Free Foundation jointly funds a sanctuary at Shamwari that cares for lions and leopards discovered in poor conditions in circuses or zoos around the world. They have two centres on the reserve, one in the north and one in the south.

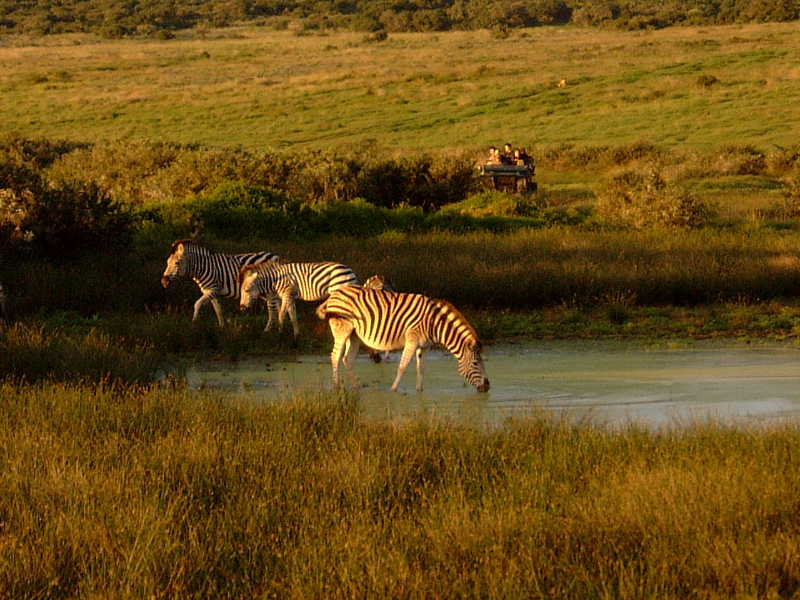
Zebras, Shamwari Game Reserve.
