= Olanguina =

Coordinates: 3.9559°N 11.9128°E

- Commune and town
- Interactive map of Olanguina
- Country: Cameroon
- Time zone: UTC+1 (WAT)

Olanguina is a town and commune in Cameroon.

== See also ==
- Communes of Cameroon
