= Mfou =

- Location in Cameroon
- Coordinates: 3°57′36″N 11°55′48″E
- Country: Cameroon
- Region: Centre Region
- Department: Méfou-et-Afamba

Government
  - Mayor: Frédéric Biwolo
  - City Manager: Christophe Mounoumé
  - Deputy Mayor: Philippe Bilounga
  - Chairman of Municipal Legislative Chamber: Aimé Ebongue
  - Deputy Chairman of Municipal Legislative Chamber: Rodrigue Ngoumou

Population (2005)
  - Total: 10,533

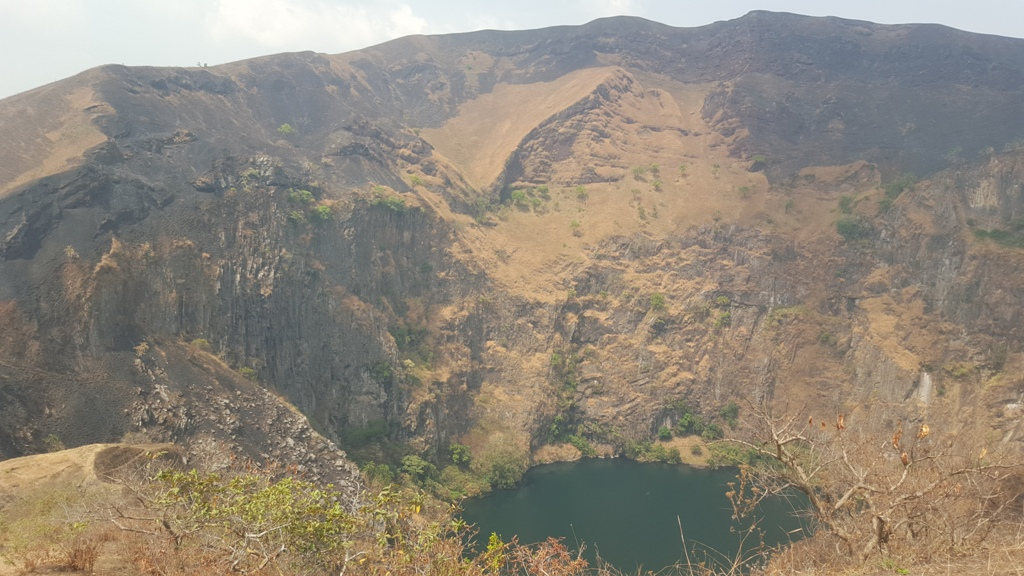
Lake Mfou on Mt Mbapit

Mfou is a town in the south part of Cameroon. It is not far east of the capital, Yaoundé. It is a rural area and the activities of the inhabitants are basically subsistence agriculture.

== Population ==
In the 2005 census, the commune had 37,209 inhabitants, including 10,533 for the town of Mfou.

== See also ==
- Centre Region (Cameroon)
