= Ape Action Africa =

Animal conservation group

- Founded: 1996
- Type: Non-profit Foundation organization
- Purpose: Environmentalism, conservation
- Location: Cameroon
- Region served: Cameroon
- Key people: Rachel Hogan – Director; Caroline McLaney – Chief Executive; Bibila Tafon – General Manager & Head of Veterinary Services
- Website: apeactionafrica.org

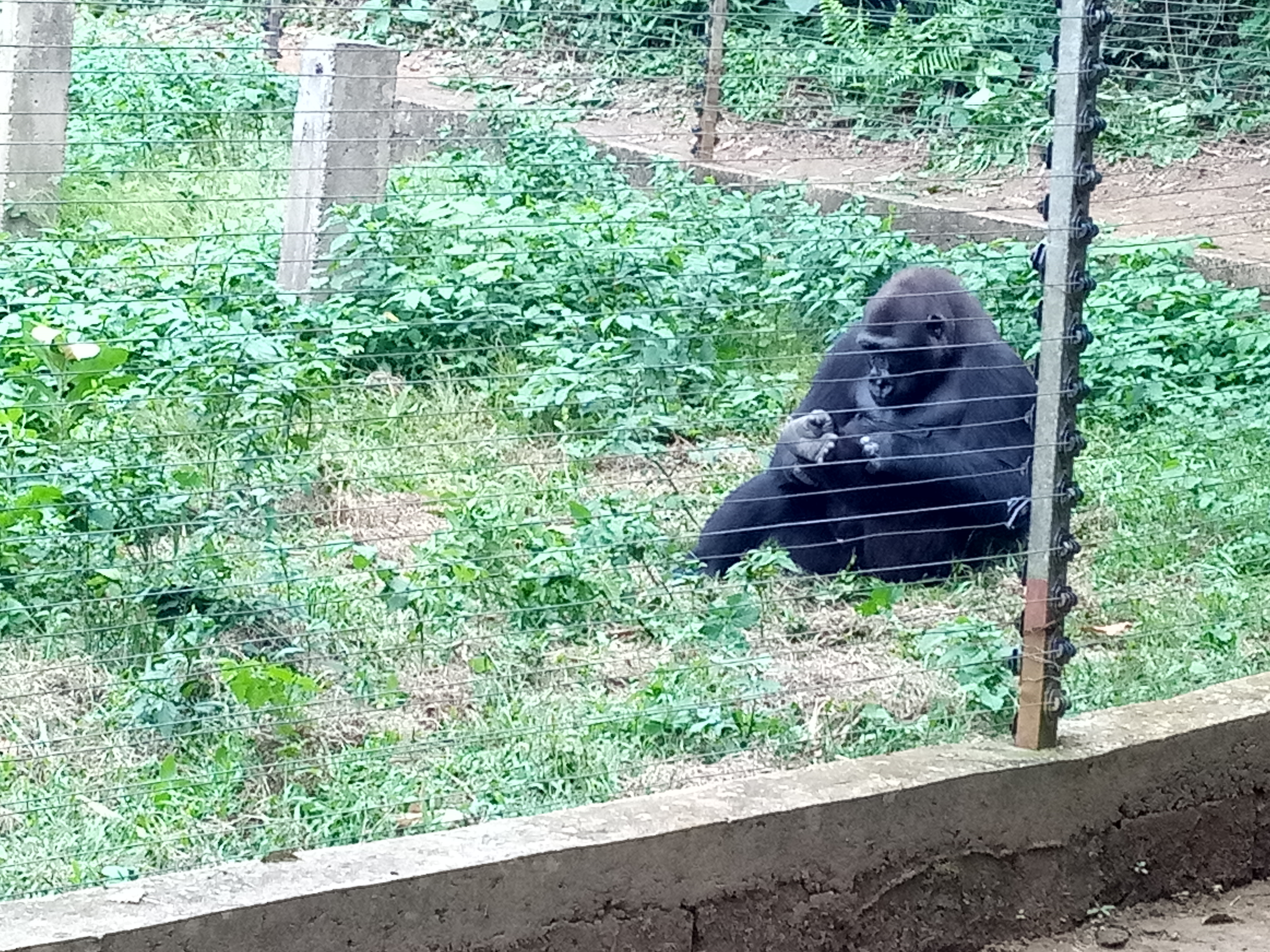
Female Gorilla in Mefou Sanctuary, Cameroon

Ape Action Africa is a non-profit NGO founded in 1996 dedicated to the conservation of endangered gorillas and chimpanzees, threatened by the bushmeat trade in Central and West Africa. Ape Action Africa manages the rescue and rehabilitation of Great apes across much of Cameroon, with a large sanctuary in the Mefou forest. Some of these Apes include the Western gorilla, Western lowland gorilla, Cross River gorilla, and the Nigeria-Cameroon chimpanzee. With more than 300 primates in its care, Ape Action Africa is now one of the largest conservation projects of its kind in Africa. Many of the animals arrive at the sanctuary as orphans, mainly due to the illegal bushmeat trade, which has grown in recent years as a result of deforestation of the Cameroonian jungle.

At the frontline of the organisation is Rachel Hogan, originally from Birmingham, who now lives full-time in the jungle.

Ape Action Africa is featured in the 2006 TV series Going Ape.

On 22 November 2010, one of the founding directors of Ape Action Africa, Avi Sivan, died in a helicopter crash while travelling between the cities of Douala and Yaoundé in Cameroon.

On 24 December 2010, the board of trustees of the charity announced Rachel Hogan as the new Director and Bibila Tafon (Babs) as the new Manager of the Mefou National Park.

On 24 April 2014, the Dublin premiere of the film Tarzan was in aid of Ape Action Africa, supported by the lead, Kellan Lutz, who is himself interested in conservation.

== History ==
Ape Action Africa was established in 1996 as a UK charity called CWAF, or Cameroon Wildlife Aid Fund, and its primary objective was to improve living conditions for primates housed at Mvog-Betsi Zoo in Yaoundé, Cameroon. During 12 years of operation, CWAF expanded its mission significantly to provide sanctuary for wild orphans of the illegal bushmeat and pet trades in Cameroon.

The charity has long been associated with Bristol Zoo, sharing some trustees with the Clifton charity. It is also supported by local businesses and several celebrities.

CWAF rebranded as Ape Action Africa in 2008 and now uses email campaigns and Facebook to communicate with supporters.

Ape Action is a member of the Pan African Sanctuary Alliance (PASA).

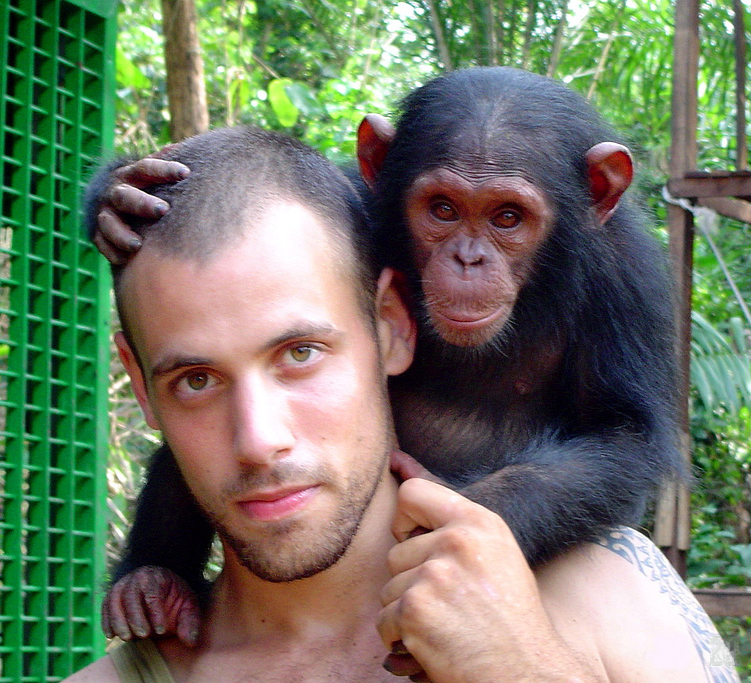
Ape Action Africa in the Mefou National Park

== Threats to primates ==
Bushmeat- refers to raw or processed meat that comes from wild animals mainly in Africa. The meat is often smoke, dried, and salted in order to be sold at the markets. Bushmeat talks about a variety of wild animals such as snakes, antelope, rats, and primates. Bushmeat becomes a threat to primates because their meat is valuable. Since the apes don't reproduce as fast as other animals there is less supply so the meat is prized.

== Volunteer programme ==
Ape Action Africa offers a limited number of self-funded volunteer placements for one- to three-months in the Mefou National Park in Cameroon to people aged over 21 with a passion for primate conservation and Africa.
