= Diel (disambiguation) =

Diel means something involving a 24-hour period that usually includes a day and the adjoining night.

Diel may also refer to:

== Biology ==
- Diel activity pattern, refers to the pattern of active times of an organism during a 24 hour cycle, such as Diurnal (active in the day), Nocturnal (active in the night), etc.
- Diel vertical migration, vertical migration is a pattern of 24 hours cyclic movement used by some organisms living in oceans and lakes.

== People with the surname Diel ==
- Adrian Diel (1756–1839), German physician and founder of pomology
- Anton Diel (1898–1959), German politician
- Paul Diel (1893–1972), French psychologist
- Charles Diel, former head men's tennis coach, 1933-1942, for Louisiana State University Tigers

== See also ==
- Diurnality
- Nocturnality
- Crepascular
- Matutinal
- Vespertine
- Cathemerality
- Diels, a surname
- Thiel (disambiguation), an etymologically related surname
