= List of nocturnal animals =

This is a list of nocturnal animals and groups of animals. There is also a more specific list of nocturnal birds.

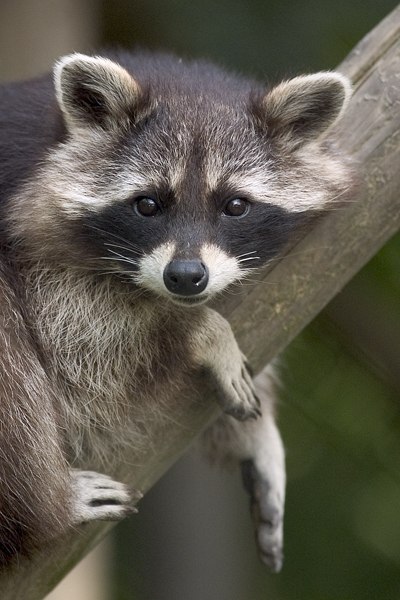
Raccoons are one of many nocturnal animals

== Known nocturnal animals ==
- Aardvark
- Aye-aye
- African elephant (possibly crepuscular; when near humans, otherwise diurnal)
- American black bear
- Woolly lemur (Avahi)
- Badger
- Bandicoot
- Bat
- Bat-eared fox
- Beaver
- Bilby
- Binturong
- Black rhinoceros
- Black rat
- Black-footed cat
- Brown rat
- Galago (bushbaby)
- Bush rat
- Capybara (some are crepuscular)
- Caracal
- Catfish
- Chinchilla
- Civet
- Cockroach
- Colugo (Flying Lemur)
- Cougar
- Coyote
- Cricket
- Cacomistle
- Cyprus spiny mouse
- Dingo
- Dolphin
- Dwarf crocodile
- Dwarf lemur
- Firefly
- Flying squirrel
- Genet (animal)
- Gerbil (some are diurnal or crepuscular)
- Giraffe (possibly crepuscular)
- Gray wolf
- Great grey slug
- Great white shark (possibly crepuscular)
- Hamster
- Hedgehog
- Hermit crab
- Hippopotamus
- Honey badger
- Hyena
- Hoffmann's two-toed sloth
- Iranian jerboa
- Jaguar (bordering on crepuscular)
- Kangaroo (most, a few are crepuscular)
- Koala (mostly nocturnal)
- Kinkajou
- Kit fox (mostly)
- Leopard
- Leopard Gecko
- Lion (bordering on crepuscular)
- Margay
- Mink (bordering on crepuscular)
- Mole
- Mouse
- Mouse lemur
- Nightingale
- Night heron
- Nightjar
- Night monkey
- Nine-banded armadillo
- Octodon (except the diurnal degus species)
- Oncilla
- Ocelot
- Opossum
- Otter
- Owl
- Pacarana
- Pangolin
- Platypus
- Paradoxical frog
- Porcupine
- Possum
- Python regius
- Quoll
- Rabbit rat
- Raccoon
- Red-eyed tree frog
- Red fox
- Ringtail
- Sambar Deer
- Scorpion
- Skunk
- Slender loris
- Slow loris
- Spectacled bear
- Sportive lemur
- Sugar glider
- Tamandua
- Tapeti
- Tarantula
- Tarsier
- Tasmanian devil
- Tiger (most species)
- Turtle
- Onychophora
- Western woolly lemur
- Whale
- Whale shark
- Whip-poor-will
- White-faced storm petrel (when caring for young)
- White-tailed deer (bordering on crepuscular)
- Wild boar
- Wolverine
- Wombat

== See also ==
- Crepuscular, a classification of animals that are active primarily during twilight, making them similar to nocturnal animals.
- Diurnality, plant or animal behavior characterized by activity during the day and sleeping at night.
- Cathemeral, a classification of organisms with sporadic and random intervals of activity during the day or night.
- Matutinal, a classification of organisms that are only or primarily active in the pre-dawn hours or early night.
- Vespertine, a classification of organisms that are only or primarily active in the evening.
- Circadian rhythm
- Chronotype
