= List of nocturnal birds =

There are many birds that are active nocturnally. Some, like owls and nighthawks, are predominantly nocturnal whereas others do specific tasks, like migrating, nocturnally.

- North Island brown kiwi, Apteryx mantelli
- Black-crowned night heron, Nycticorax nycticorax
- Barn owl, Tyto alba
- Short-eared owl, Asio flammeus
- Long-eared owl, Asio otus
- Great horned owl, Bubo virginianus
- Barred owl, Strix varia
- Spotted owl, Strix occidentalis
- Eastern screech-owl, Megascops asio
- Western screech-owl, Megascops kennicottii
- Whiskered screech-owl, Megascops trichopsis
- Flammulated owl, Psiloscops flammeolus
- Elf owl, Micrathene whitneyi
- Great gray owl, Strix nebulosa
- Northern saw-whet owl, Aegolius acadicus
- Boreal owl, Aegolius funereus
- Burrowing owl, Athene cunicularia
- Powerful owl, Ninox strenua
- Barking owl, Ninox connivens
- Southern boobook, Ninox boobook
- Tasmanian boobook, Ninox leucopsis
- Rufous owl, Ninox rufa
- Norfolk Island Boobook, Ninox novaeseelandiae undulata
- Christmas Island Hawk-Owl, Ninox natalis
- Eastern barn owl, Tyto alba delicatula
- Kākāpō, Strigops habroptilus
- Marbled frogmouth, Podargus ocellatus
- Tawny frogmouth, Podargus strigoides
- Papuan frogmouth, Podargus papuensis
- White-throated nightjar, Eurostopodus mystacalis
- Spotted nightjar, Eurostopodus argus
- Australasian Large-tailed nightjar, Caprimulgus macrurus schlegelii
- Australian owlet-nightjar, Aegotheles cristatus
- Oilbird, Steatornis caripensis
- Common nightingale, Luscinia megarhynchos

== See also ==
- Crepuscular, a classification of animals that are active primarily during twilight, making them similar to nocturnal animals.
- Diurnality, plant or animal behavior characterized by activity during the day and sleeping at night.
- Cathemeral, a classification of organisms with sporadic and random intervals of activity during the day or night.
- Matutinal, a classification of organisms that are only or primarily active in the pre-dawn hours or early morning.
- Vespertine (biology), a classification of organisms that are only or primarily active in the evening.
- Circadian rhythm
- Chronotype
- List of nocturnal animals
