= Matutinal =

Natural world activity in early morning

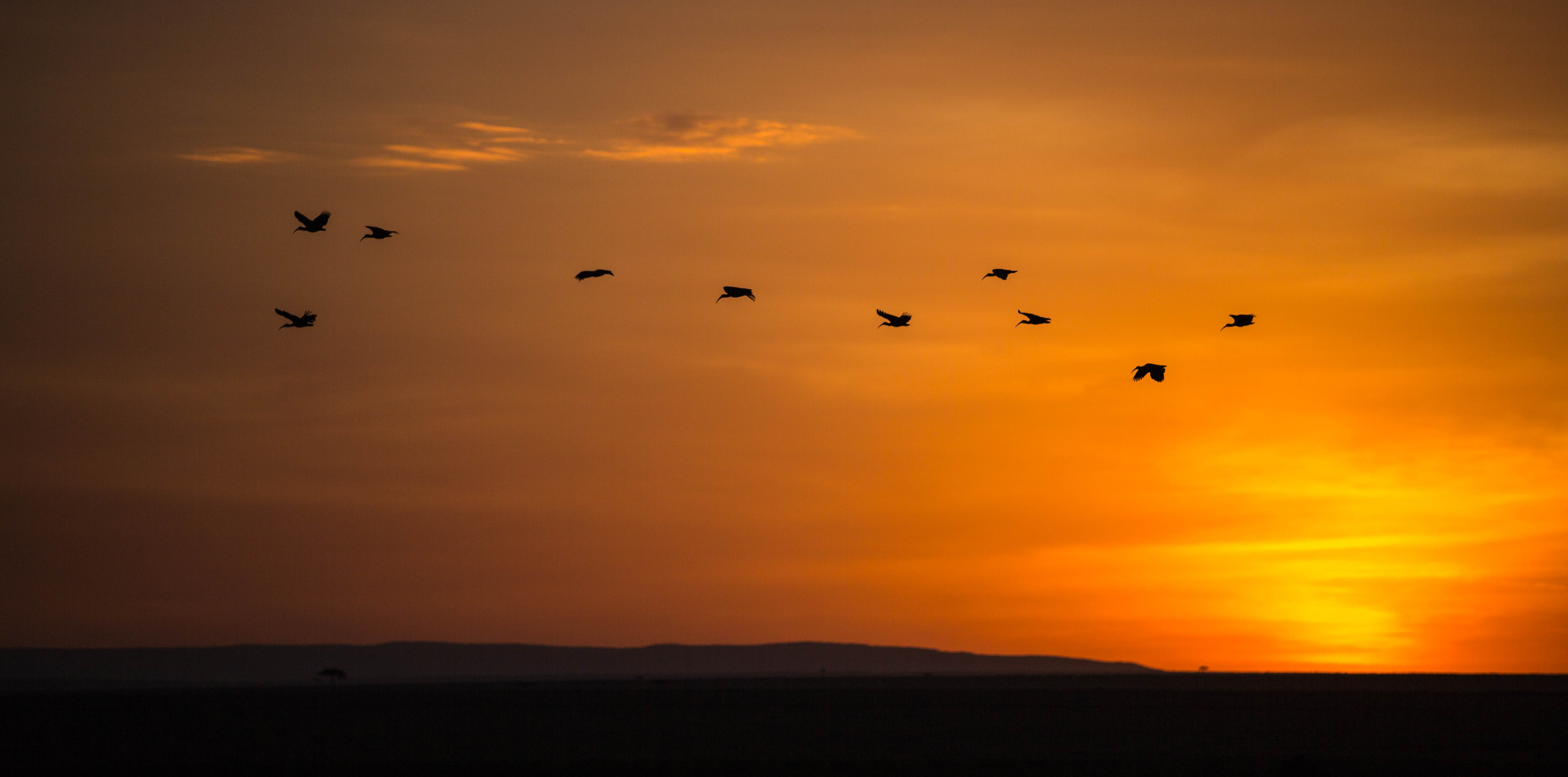
Birds flying before dawn over the Maasai Mara

Matutinal activity occurs in the twilight period from dawn to sunrise

In the life sciences, matutinal, matinal (in entomology), or matutine animals are active around morning twilight, when they scan for mates, mate, and forage.

Matutinal and vespertine behaviors are the morning and evening aspects of crepuscular activity.

Matutinal behaviour is likely adaptive because at those times, there may be less inter-species competition and higher availability of food. It may also protect animals by avoiding diurnal and nocturnal predators.

== Etymology ==
The word matutinal is derived from the Latin word mātūtīnus, meaning "of or pertaining to the morning", from Mātūta, the Roman goddess of the morning or dawn (+ -īnus '-ine' + -ālis '-al').

== Adaptive relevance ==
Selection pressures, such as high predatory activity or low food, may require behavioural adaptation. Changing the time of day when it is active is such an adaptation. For example, human activity, which is largely diurnal, has forced certain species (most often larger mammals) living in urban areas to shift their schedules to crepuscular ones. In environments where there is little or no human activity, these same species often do not exhibit this temporal shift. Although a nocturnal schedule might be safer, many of these animals depend on sight, so a matutinal or crepuscular schedule is especially advantageous as it allows animals to avoid predation, while having sufficient light to see.

=== Matutinal mating ===
For certain species, commencing mating during the early morning's twilight period may be adaptive because it could reduce the risk of predation, increase the chance of finding mates, and reduce competition for mates, all of which may increase reproductive success.

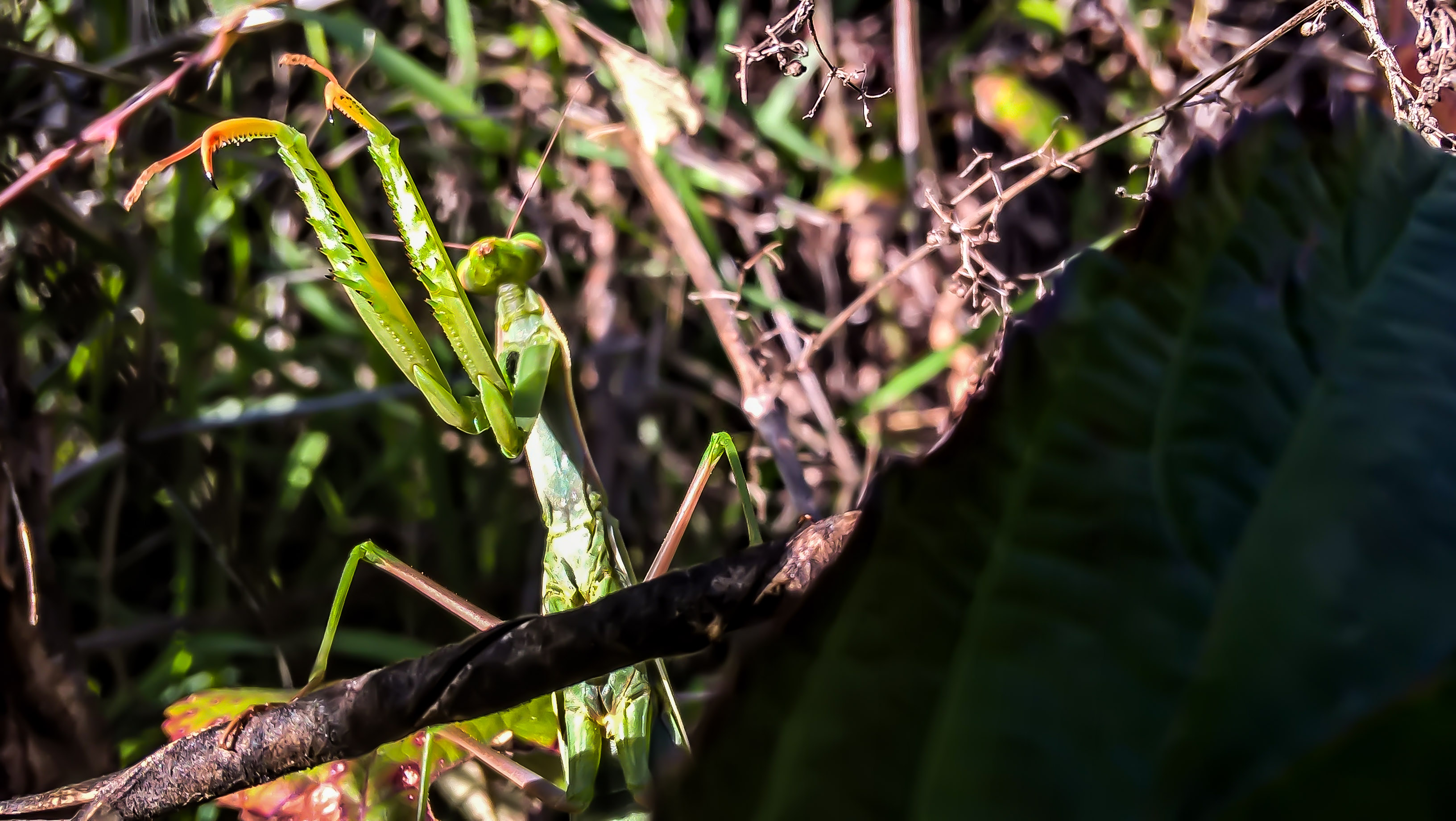
A praying mantis (Mantis religiosa) blending in with its environment. To mate, they must terminate this pose and take up a more vulnerable one. They only do this during matutinal hours.

==== Anti-predatory adaptation ====
Animals are generally more vulnerable during copulation (e.g., praying mantis), so mating during a time when there is less predatory activity may be an anti-predatory adaptation. Some species may even take up to several hours to finish mating, which increases this vulnerability. For species that copulate for longer periods, shifting their mating schedule may additionally allow enough time for the male to completely inseminate the female (i.e., it will reduce the chance of having to escape from a predator mid-copulation). One example of a matutinal mating routine is exhibited by female tropical praying mantises (Mantis religiosa). To avoid detection from predators they use different stances to blend in with their environment. They can orient themselves to look like leaves or sticks. However, when females are ready to mate they will take up a different posture where they expose pheromone-emitting glands that attract mates, and in the process must disengage from their normal camouflaging stance. Likely to compensate for this vulnerability, females will initiate this stance only at first light when diurnal predators that are visual hunters are less active (e.g., birds and insectivorous primates).

==== Reduced competition ====
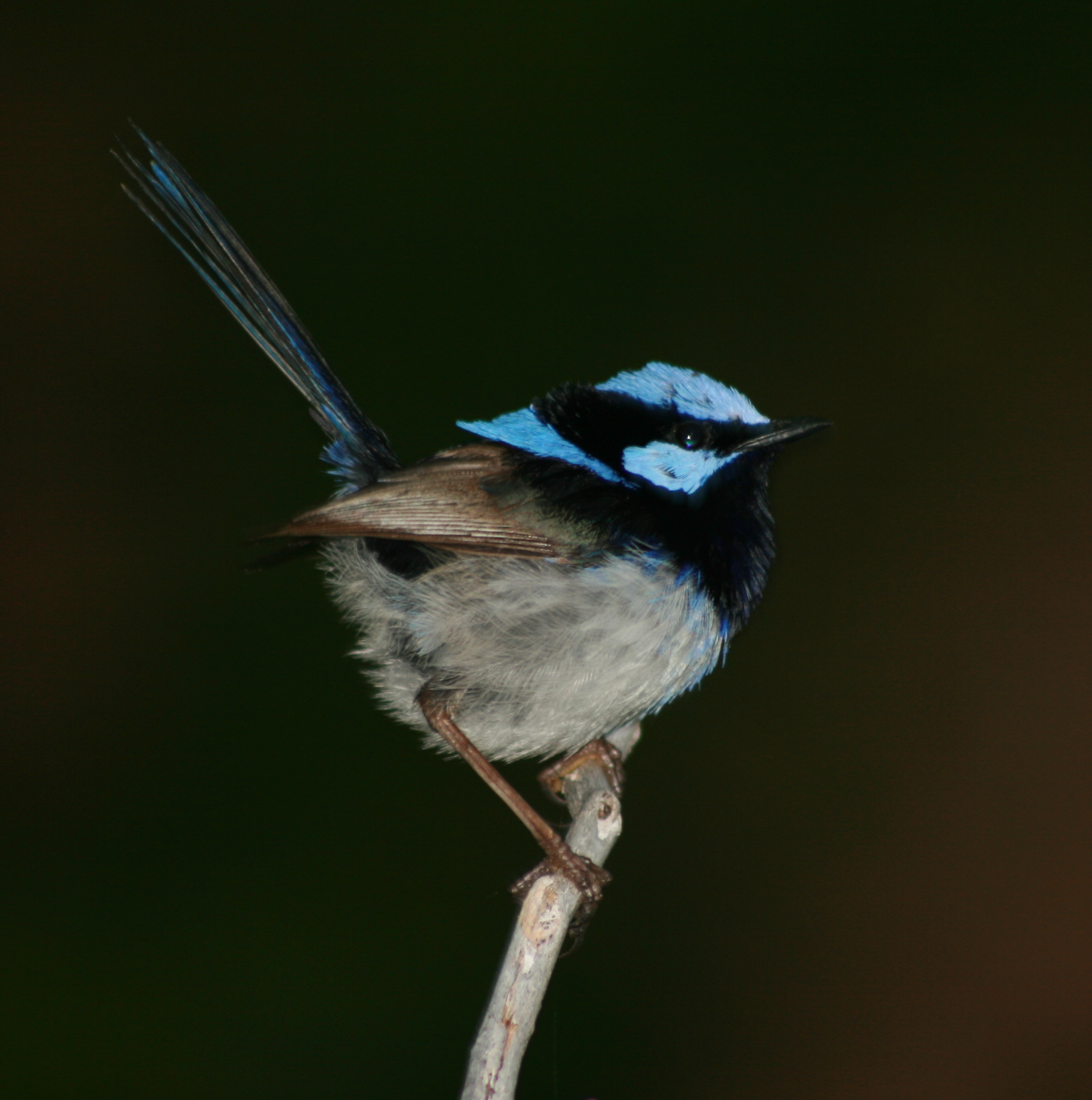
A superb fairywren (Malurus cyaneus). This bird engages in extra-pair copulations during pre-dawn and early morning hours.

Some animals engage in matutinal searching flights to find mates early in the morning. It is thought that this is adaptive because it increases the chance of finding mates and reduces competition for mates (i.e., by flying directly to a potential mate before it has a chance to find other mates). This is supported by the mating behaviour of certain socially monogamous birds. For example, female superb fairywrens (Malurus cyaneus) are monogamous birds that perform extra-pair copulations during matutinal hours. One explanation for the prevalence of extra-pair copulation is that it enhances the gene pool of the species' offspring. This activity is most often seen matutinally because they: (1) can avoid being followed by their monogamous partner in the dimly-lit early morning, (2) males are more likely to be present in their territory during these hours, and (3) males are more likely to have a higher quantity of sperm in the early morning. These points may apply to how matutinal mating is adaptive in other species.

Similar behaviours have been observed in other species, such as in males of two species of dragonflies (Aeshna grandis & Aeshna viridis). They engage in matutinal searching flights each morning until they find a receptive female to mate with. A similar phenomenon is seen in male praying mantises, where they respond to the emerging light each morning by increasing flight activity.

=== Matutinal foraging ===
Some animals exhibit increased foraging behaviour during the matutinal hours. Some examples of why this may be adaptive are: (1) it may increase predatory success and (2) competition for food may be reduced.

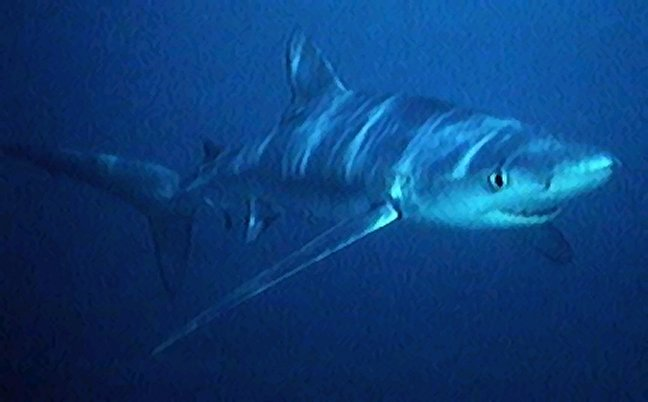
A blue shark (Prionace glauca). These sharks spend more time at the ocean's surface during matutinal hours - likely for predatory reasons.

==== Predatory adaptation ====
The blue shark (Prionace glauca) is a predator that primarily hunts during the pre-dawn to dawn period. During matutinal hours, they spend more time than any other point in the day at the surface of the ocean. It is likely that they are taking advantage of the increased density of prey at the water's surface during dawn. It is also possible that, since only a thin layer at the surface of the ocean is dimly lit during this twilight period, the shark (coming up from the dark ocean depths) has vision of the prey, but the prey do not have vision of the shark, allowing the shark to sneak up on the prey, increasing predatory success.

==== Reduced competition ====
Some bees (e.g., Ptiloglossa arizonensis, Pt. jonesi, Caupolicana, and Hemihalictus lustrans) forage matutinally, possibly because there is less competition for food during this period. The Hemihalictus lustrans, for example, is a bee that works mutualistically with the dandelion Pyrrhopappus carolinianus during matutinal hours. Pyrrhopappus carolinianus flowers very early in the morning and Hemihalictus lustrans begins foraging at the same time. The bee tears open the dandelion's anthers just as it is flowering, which speeds up anthesis and ensures that it almost always has first claim to the dandelion's pollen.

== Physiological evidence of adaptation ==
These matutinal behaviours may be induced by physiological adaptations. Robinson & Robinson reversed the day-night schedule of female tropical praying mantises (i.e., by placing them in light during the night, and in a chamber with no light during the day). After they adjusted to the schedule, the praying mantises were removed from their chambers at different times throughout the newly adjusted night period and placed in the light. Each praying mantis initiated their pheromone-emitting stance during this transition regardless of the time, which suggests that this behaviour depends solely on the transition from dark to light. The authors suggested that this was likely a physiological adaptation.

== See also ==
- Crepuscular animal
- Vespertine (biology)
- Diurnality
- Nocturnality
- Crypsis
