= Vespertine (biology) =

Occurrence during dusk

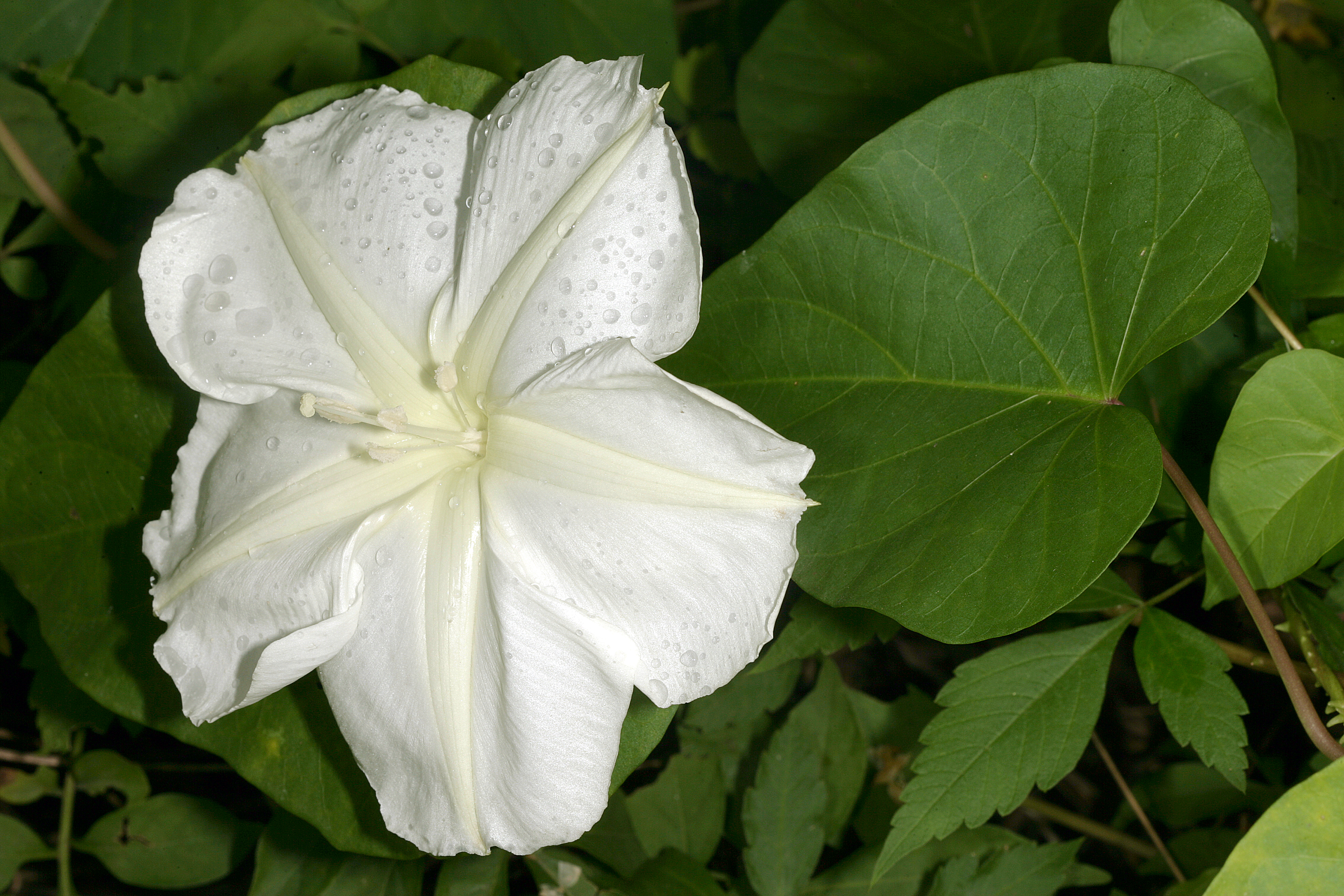
Ipomoea alba is a vespertine plant in the morning glory family, Convolvulaceae. Like many night-blooming plants, it is moth pollinated.

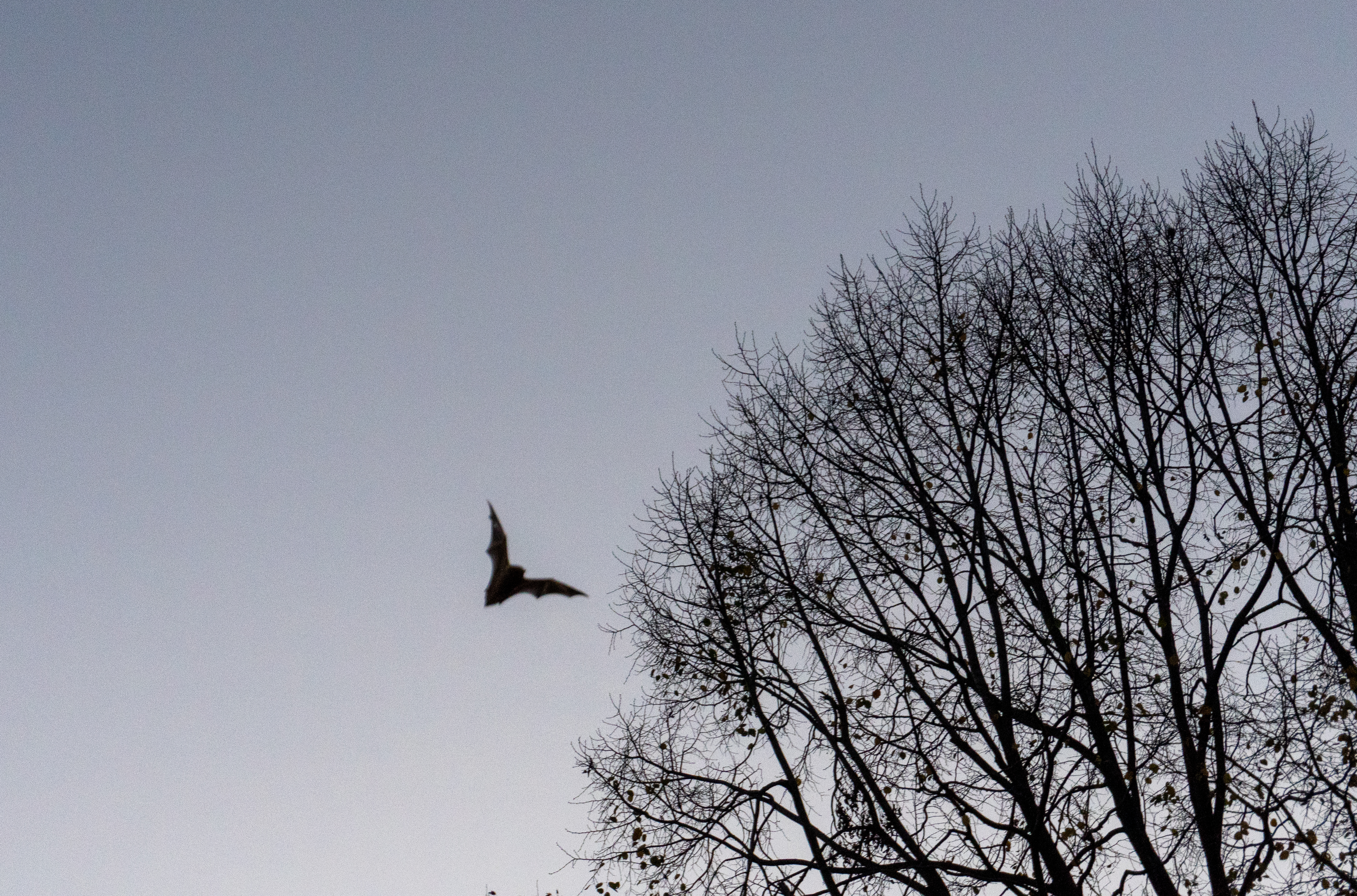
A bat flying at dusk

Vespertine is a term used in the life sciences to indicate something of, relating to, or occurring in the dusk. In botany, a vespertine flower is one that opens or blooms in the dusk. In zoology, the term is used for a creature that becomes active at dusk, such as bats and owls. Strictly speaking, vespertine means that activity ceases during the hours of full darkness and does not resume until the next dusk. Activity that continues throughout the night should be described as nocturnal.

Vespertine behaviour is a special case of crepuscular behaviour; like crepuscular activity, vespertine activity is limited to dusk rather than full darkness. Unlike vespertine activity, crepuscular activity may resume in dim twilight before dawn. A related term is matutinal, referring to activity limited to the dawn twilight.

The word vespertine is derived from the Latin word vespertīnus, an adjective meaning "dusk".

== See also ==
- Crypsis
- Matutinal
