= Nocturnal animal =

Behavior characterized by activity during the night and sleeping during the day

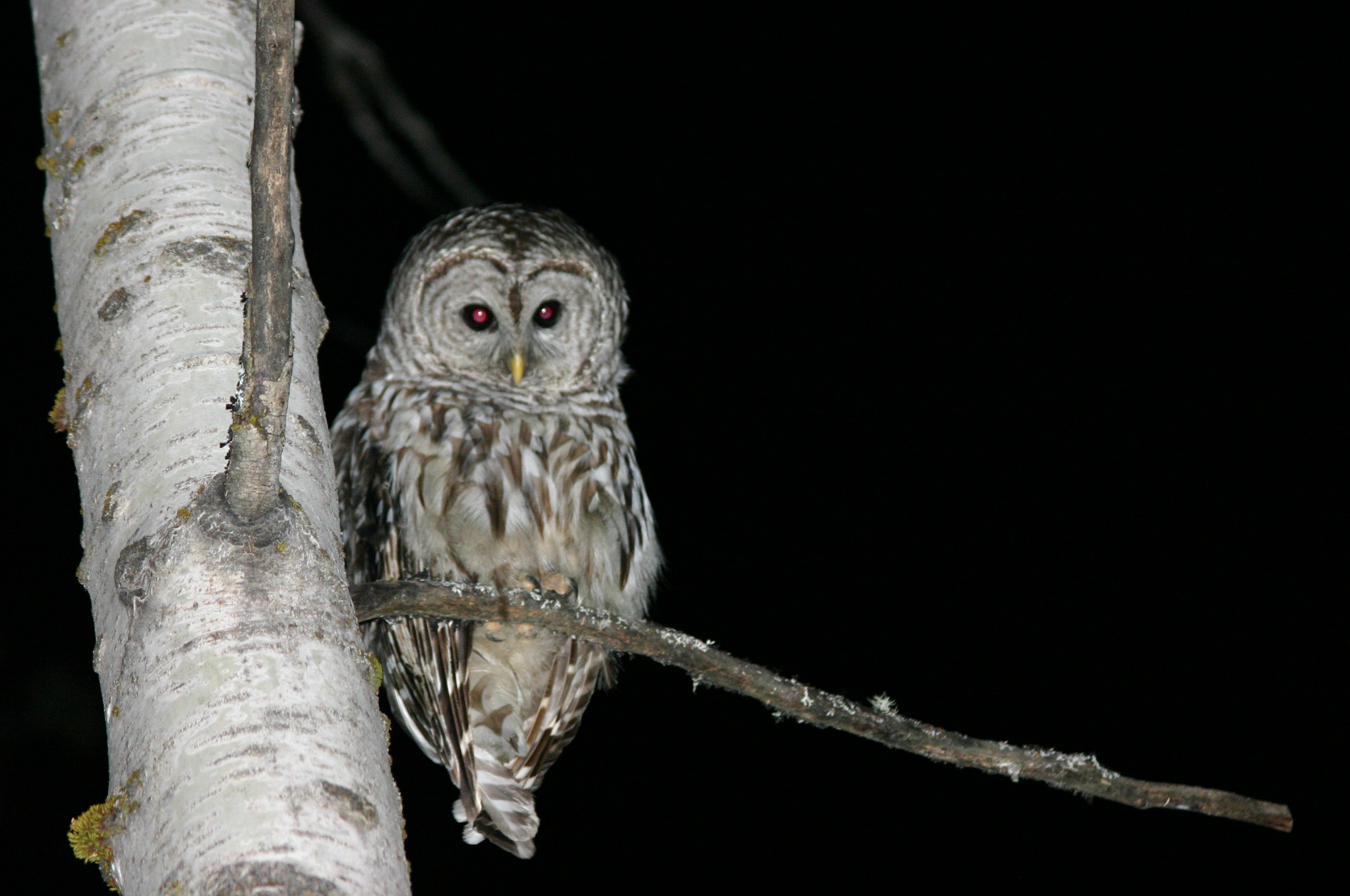
Owls are well known for being nocturnal, but some owls are active during the day.

Nocturnality is a behavior in some non-human animals characterized by being active during the night and sleeping during the day. The common adjective is nocturnal, with diurnal meaning the opposite.

Nocturnal creatures generally have highly developed senses of hearing, smell, and specially adapted eyesight. Some animals, such as ferrets, have eyes that can adapt to both low-level and bright day levels of illumination (see metaturnal). Others, such as bushbabies and (some) bats, can function only at night. Many nocturnal creatures including tarsiers and some owls have large eyes in comparison with their body size to compensate for the lower light levels at night. More specifically, they have been found to have a larger cornea relative to their eye size than diurnal creatures to increase their visual sensitivity: in the low-light conditions. Nocturnality helps wasps, such as Apoica flavissima, avoid hunting in intense sunlight.

Diurnal animals, including humans (except for night owls), squirrels and songbirds, are active during the daytime. Crepuscular species, such as rabbits, skunks, domestic cats, tigers and hyenas, are often erroneously referred to as nocturnal. Cathemeral species, such as fossas and lions, are active both in the day and at night.

== Origins ==
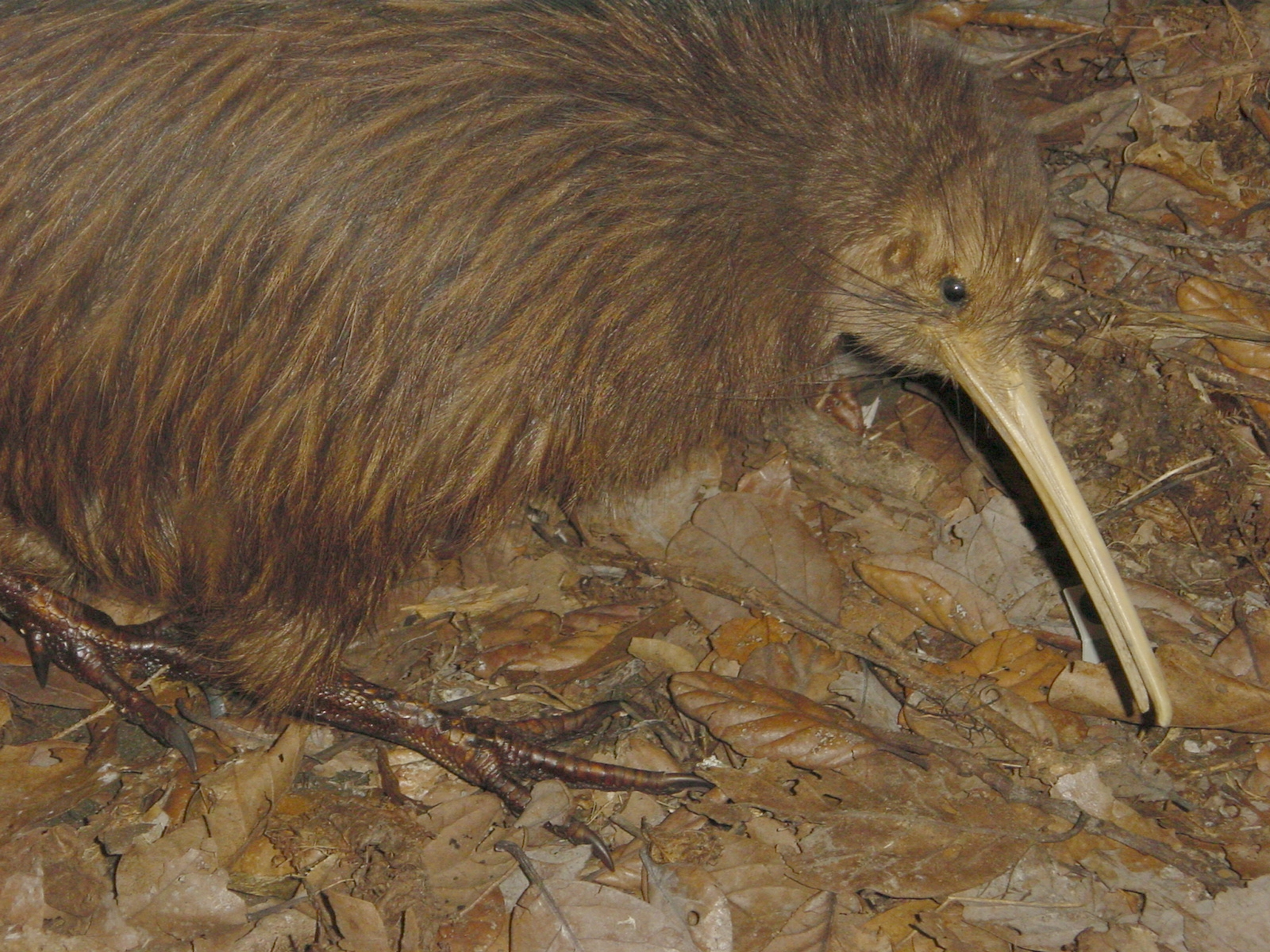
The kiwi is a family of nocturnal birds endemic to New Zealand.

While it is difficult to say which came first, nocturnality or diurnality, a hypothesis in evolutionary biology, the nocturnal bottleneck theory, postulates that in the Mesozoic, many ancestors of modern-day mammals evolved nocturnal characteristics in order to avoid contact with the numerous diurnal predators. A recent study attempts to answer the question as to why so many modern day mammals retain these nocturnal characteristics even though they are not active at night. The leading answer is that the high visual acuity that comes with diurnal characteristics is not needed anymore due to the evolution of compensatory sensory systems, such as a heightened sense of smell and more astute auditory systems. In a 2018 study, recently extinct elephant birds and modern day nocturnal kiwi bird skulls were examined to recreate their likely brain and skull formation. They indicated that olfactory bulbs were much larger in comparison to their optic lobes, indicating they both have a common ancestor who evolved to function as a nocturnal species, decreasing their eyesight in favor of a better sense of smell. The anomaly to this theory were anthropoids, who appeared to have the most divergence from nocturnality of all organisms examined. While most mammals did not exhibit the morphological characteristics expected of a nocturnal creature, reptiles and birds fit in perfectly. A larger cornea and pupil correlated well with whether these two classes of organisms were nocturnal or not.

== Advantages ==
=== Resource competition ===
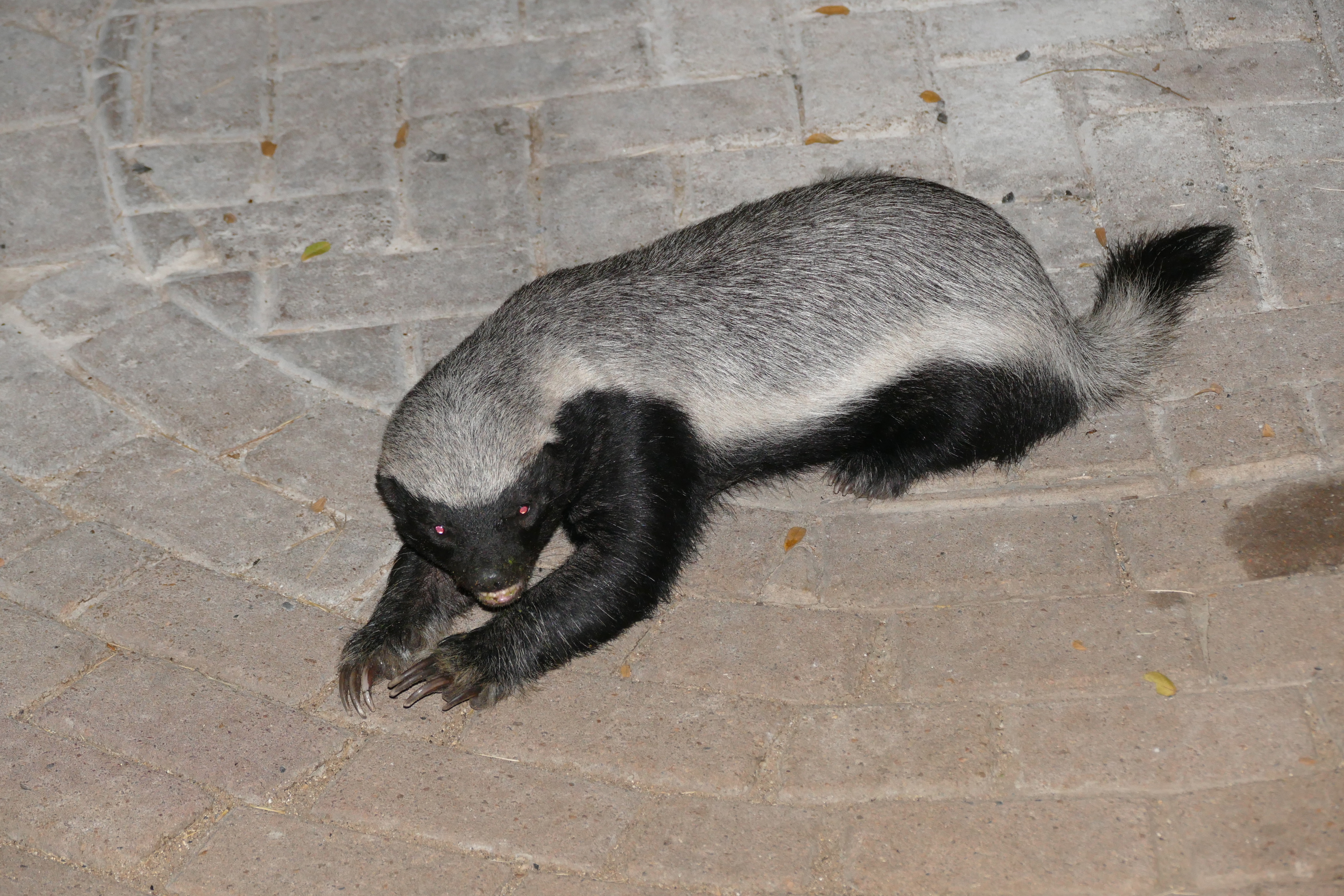
The honey badger, a nocturnal animal.

Being active at night is a form of niche differentiation, where a species' niche is partitioned not by the amount of resources but by the amount of time (i.e. temporal division of the ecological niche). Hawks and owls can hunt the same field or meadow for the same rodents without conflict because hawks are diurnal and owls are nocturnal. This means they are not in competition for each other's prey. Another niche that being nocturnal lessens competition within is pollination - nocturnal pollinators such as moths, beetles, thrips, and bats have a lower risk of being seen by predators, and the plants evolved temporal scent production and ambient heat to attract nocturnal pollination. Like with predators hunting the same prey, some plants such as apples can be pollinated both during the day and at night.

=== Predation ===
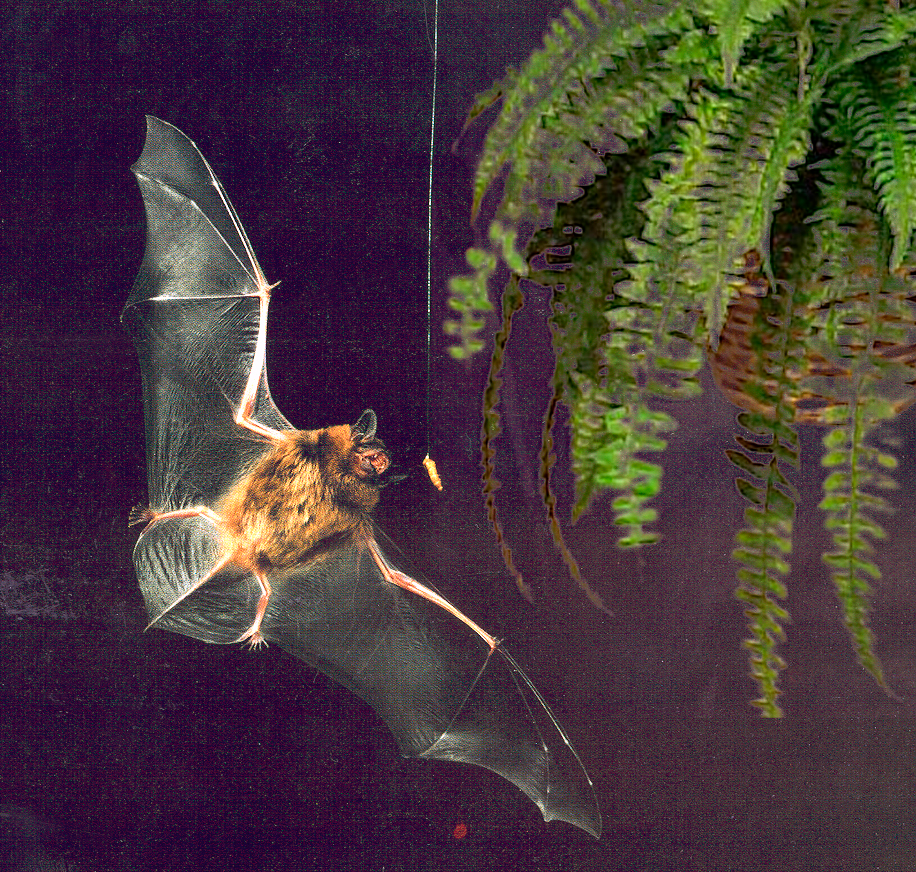
Echolocating bats adjust their vocalization to catch insects against a changing environmental background.

Nocturnality is a form of crypsis, an adaptation to avoid or enhance predation. Although lions are cathemeral, and may be active at any time of day or night, they prefer to hunt at night because many of their prey species (zebra, antelope, impala, wildebeest, etc.) have poor night vision. Many species of small rodents, such as the Large Japanese Field Mouse, are active at night because most of the dozen or so birds of prey that hunt them are diurnal. There are many diurnal species that exhibit some nocturnal behaviors. For example, many seabirds and sea turtles only gather at breeding sites or colonies at night to reduce the risk of predation to themselves and/or their offspring. Nocturnal species take advantage of the night time to prey on species that are used to avoiding diurnal predators. Some nocturnal fish species will use the moonlight to prey on zooplankton species that come to the surface at night. Some species have developed unique adaptations that allow them to hunt in the dark. Bats are famous for using echolocation to hunt down their prey, using sonar sounds to capture them in the dark.

=== Water conservation ===
Another reason for nocturnality is avoiding the heat of the day. This is especially true in arid biomes like deserts, where nocturnal behavior prevents creatures from losing precious water during the hot, dry daytime. This is an adaptation that enhances osmoregulation. One of the reasons that (cathemeral) lions prefer to hunt at night is to conserve water. Hamilton's frog, found on Stephens and Maud islands, stays hidden for most of the day when temperatures are warmer and is mainly active at night. They will only come out during the day if there are humid and cool conditions.

Many plant species native to arid biomes have adapted so that their flowers only open at night when the sun's intense heat cannot wither and destroy their moist, delicate blossoms. These flowers are pollinated by bats, another creature of the night.

Climate change has led to an increasing number of diurnal species to push their activity patterns closer towards crepuscular or fully nocturnal behavior. This adaptive measure allows species to avoid the day's heat, without having to leave that particular habitat.

== Human disturbances ==
The exponential increase in human expansion and technological advances in the last few centuries has had a major effect on nocturnal animals, as well as diurnal species. The causes of these can be traced to distinct, sometimes overlapping areas: light pollution and spatial disturbance.

=== Light pollution ===
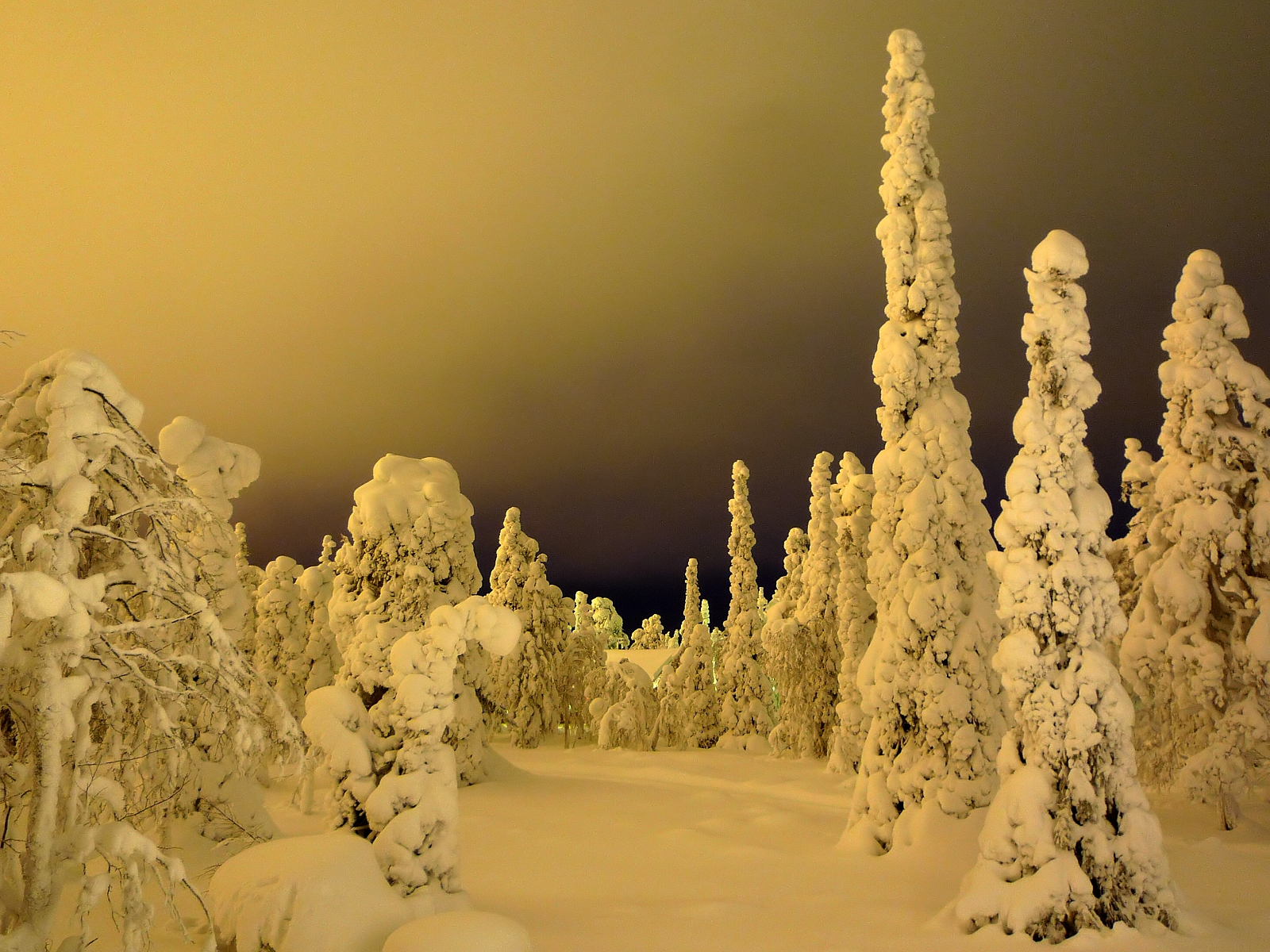
Light pollution on a ski slope in Finland gives the area a hazy, brightened sky.

Light pollution is a major issue for nocturnal species, and the impact continues to increase as electricity reaches parts of the world that previously had no access. Species in the tropics are generally more affected by this due to the change in their relatively constant light patterns, but temperate species relying on day-night triggers for behavioral patterns are also affected as well. Many diurnal species see the benefit of a "longer day", allowing for a longer hunting period which is detrimental to their nocturnal prey trying to avoid them.

==== Orientation ====
Light pollution can disorient species that are used to darkness, as their adaptive eyes are not as used to the artificial lighting. Insects are the most obvious example, who are attracted by the lighting and are usually killed by either the heat or electrical current. Some species of frogs are blinded by the quick changes in light, while nocturnal migratory birds may be disoriented, causing them to lose direction, tire out, or be captured by predators. Sea turtles are particularly affected by this, adding to a number of threats to the different endangered species. Adults are likely to stay away from artificially lit beaches that they might prefer to lay eggs on, as there is less cover against predators. Additionally, baby sea turtles that hatch from eggs on artificially lit beaches often get lost, heading towards the light sources as opposed to the ocean.

==== Rhythmic behaviors ====
Rhythmic behaviors are affected by light pollution both seasonally and daily patterns. Migrating birds or mammals might have issues with the timing of their movement for example. On a day-to-day basis, species can see significant changes in their internal temperatures, their general movement, feeding and body mass. These small scale changes can eventually lead to a population decline, as well as hurting local trophic levels and interconnecting species. Some typically diurnal species have even become crepuscular or nocturnal as a result of light pollution and general human disturbance.

==== Reproduction ====
There have been documented effects of light pollution on reproductive cycles and factors in different species. It can affect mate choice, migration to breeding grounds, and nest site selection. In male green frogs, artificial light causes a decrease in mate calls and continued to move around instead of waiting for a potential mate to arrive. This hurts the overall fitness of the species, which is concerning considering the overall decrease in amphibian populations.

==== Predation ====
Some nocturnal predator-prey relationships are interrupted by artificial lighting. Bats that are fast-moving are often at an advantage with insects being drawn to light; they are fast enough to escape any predators also attracted to the light, leaving slow-moving bats at a disadvantage. Another example is harbor seals eating juvenile salmon that moved down a river lit by nearby artificial lighting. Once the lights were turned off, predation levels decreased. Many diurnal prey species forced into being nocturnal are susceptible to nocturnal predators and those species with poor nocturnal eyesight often bear the brunt of the cost.

=== Spatial disturbance ===
The increasing amount of habitat destruction worldwide as a result of human expansion has given both advantages and disadvantages to different nocturnal animals. As a result of peak human activity in the daytime, more species are likely to be active at night in order to avoid the new disturbance in their habitat. Carnivorous predators however are less timid of the disturbance, feeding on human waste and keeping a relatively similar spatial habitat as they did before. In comparison, herbivorous prey tend to stay in areas where human disturbance is low, limiting both resources and their spatial habitat. This leads to an imbalance in favor of predators, who increase in population and come out more often at night.

== In captivity ==
=== Zoos ===
In zoos, nocturnal animals are usually kept in special night-illumination enclosures to invert their normal sleep-wake cycle and to keep them active during the hours when visitors will be there to see them.

=== Pets ===
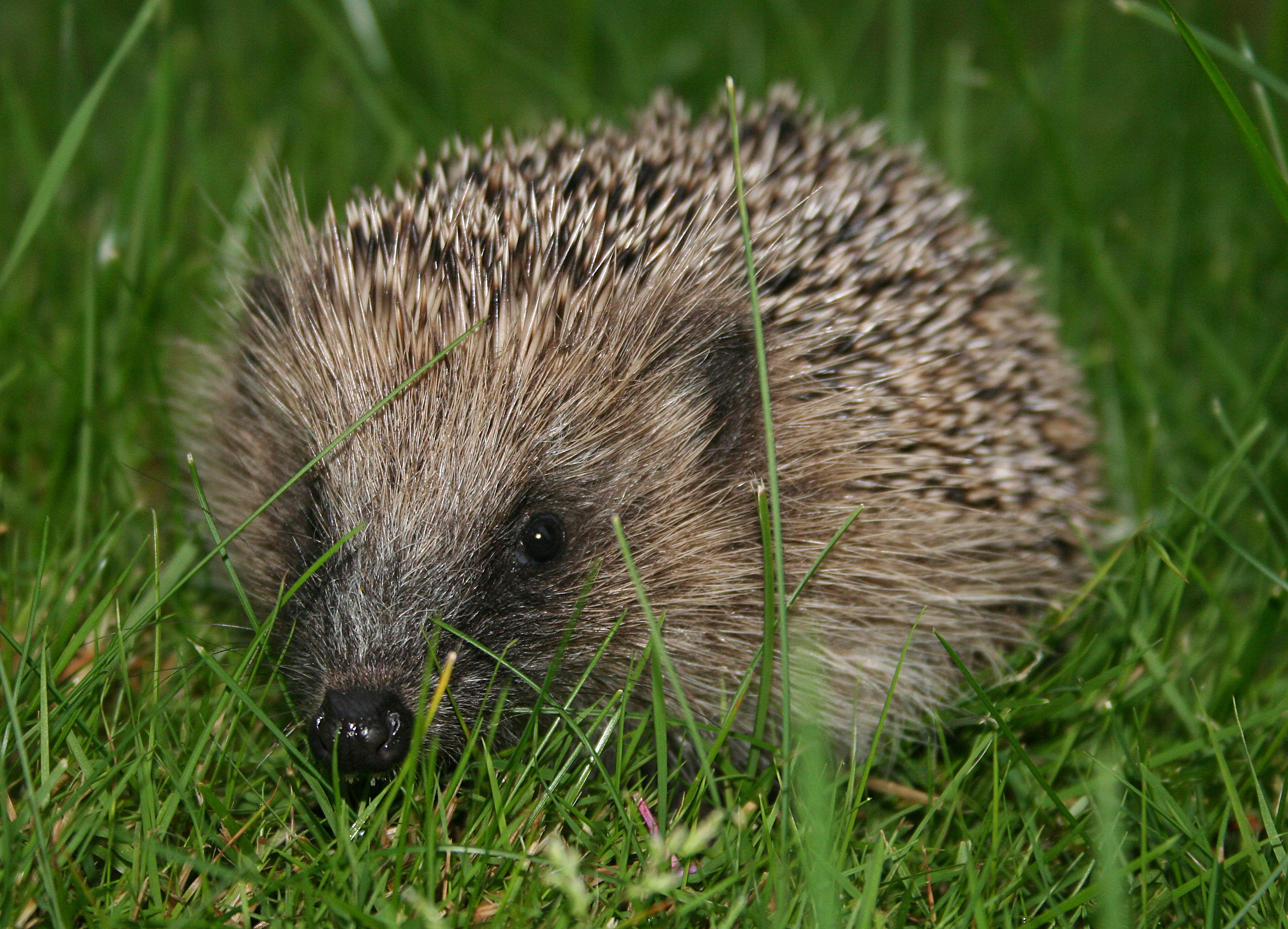
Hedgehogs are mostly nocturnal.

Hedgehogs and sugar gliders are just two of the many nocturnal species kept as (exotic) pets.

== See also ==
- Adaptation
- Antipredator adaptation
- Competitive exclusion principle
- Crepuscular
- Crypsis
- Diurnality
- List of nocturnal animals
- List of nocturnal birds
- Niche (ecology)
- Niche differentiation
- Night owl (person)
- Tapetum lucidum
