= Crepuscular animal =

Animal behavior primarily characterized by activity during the twilight

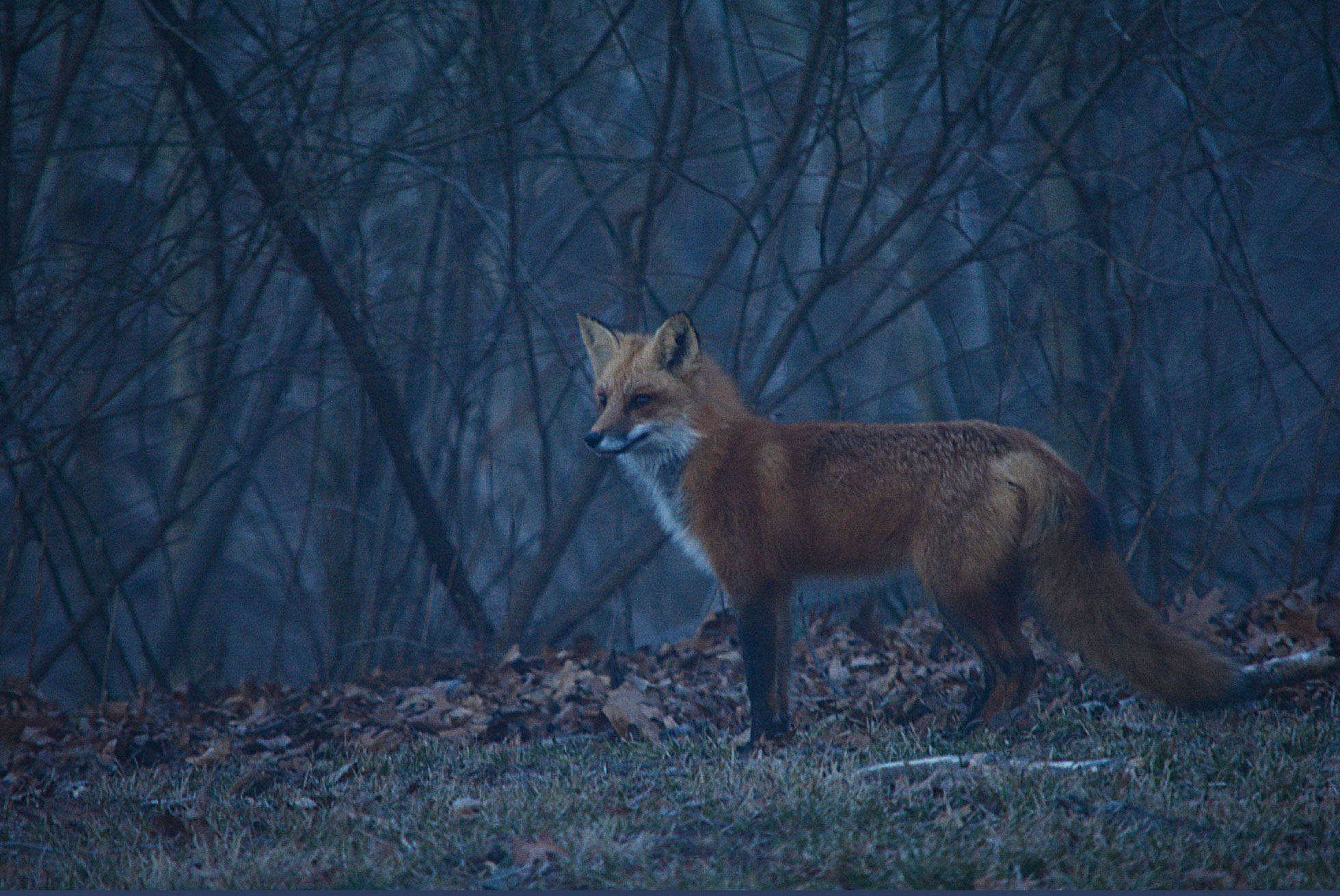
A red fox at dusk

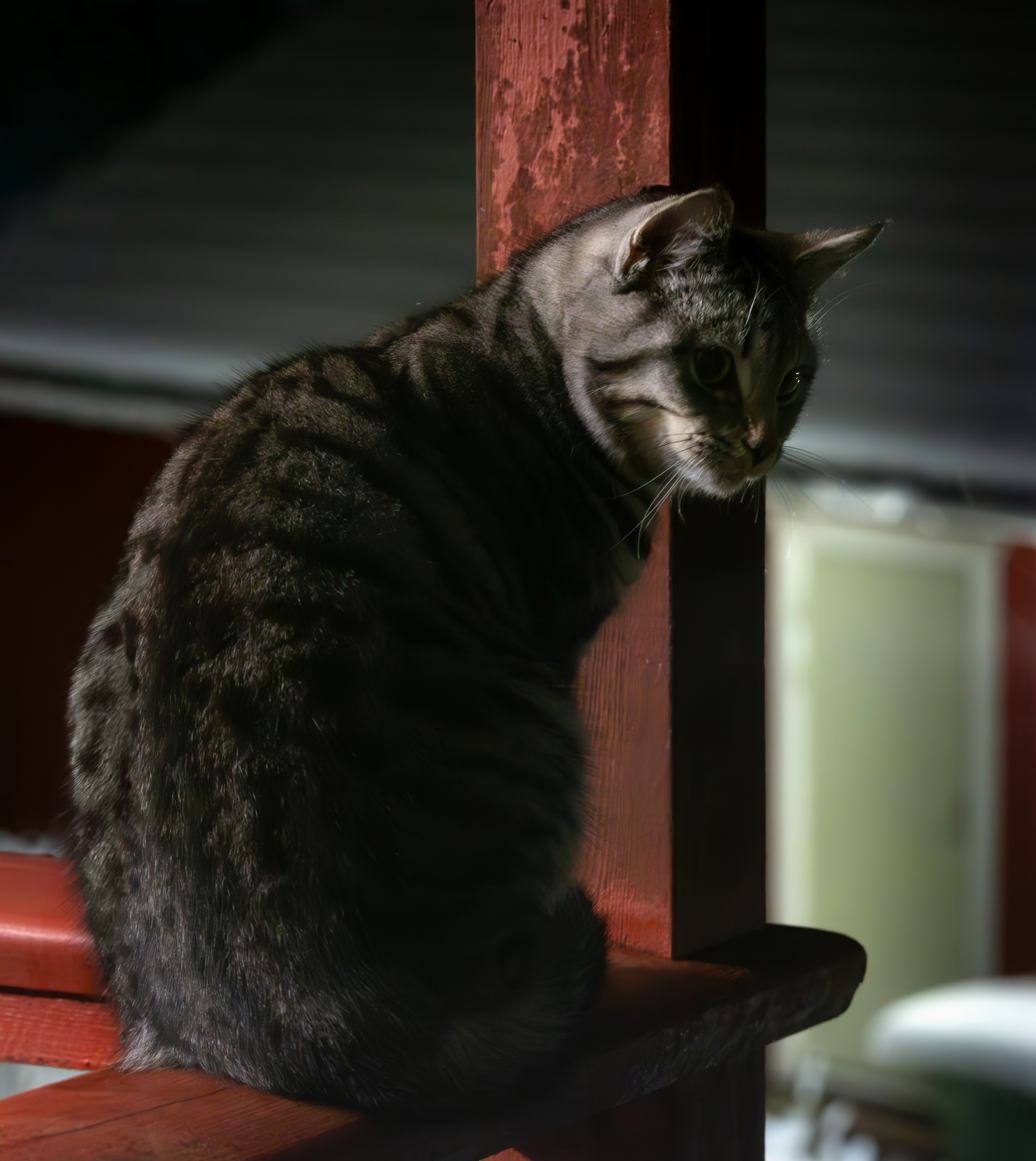
A domestic cat under low light

In zoology, a crepuscular animal is one that is active primarily during the twilight period: being matutinal (active around dawn), vespertine/vespertinal (active around dusk), or both. This is distinguished from diurnal and nocturnal behavior, in which an animal is active during the daytime or at night, respectively. Some crepuscular animals may also be active by moonlight or during an overcast day, under lower-light conditions.

A number of factors affect the time of day an animal is active. Predators hunt when their prey is available, and prey try to avoid the times when their principal predators are at-large. The temperature may be too high at midday or too low at night. Some creatures may adjust their activities depending on local competition.

== Etymology and usage ==
The word crepuscular derives from Latin crepusculum, 'twilight'. Its sense accordingly differs from diurnal and nocturnal behavior, which respectively peak during hours of daytime and night. The distinction is not absolute, because crepuscular animals may also be active on a bright moonlit night or on a dull day. Some animals casually described as nocturnal are in fact crepuscular.

Special classes of crepuscular behaviour include matutinal, or "matinal", animals active only in the dawn, and vespertine, only in the dusk. Those active during both times are said to have a bimodal activity pattern.

== Adaptive relevance ==
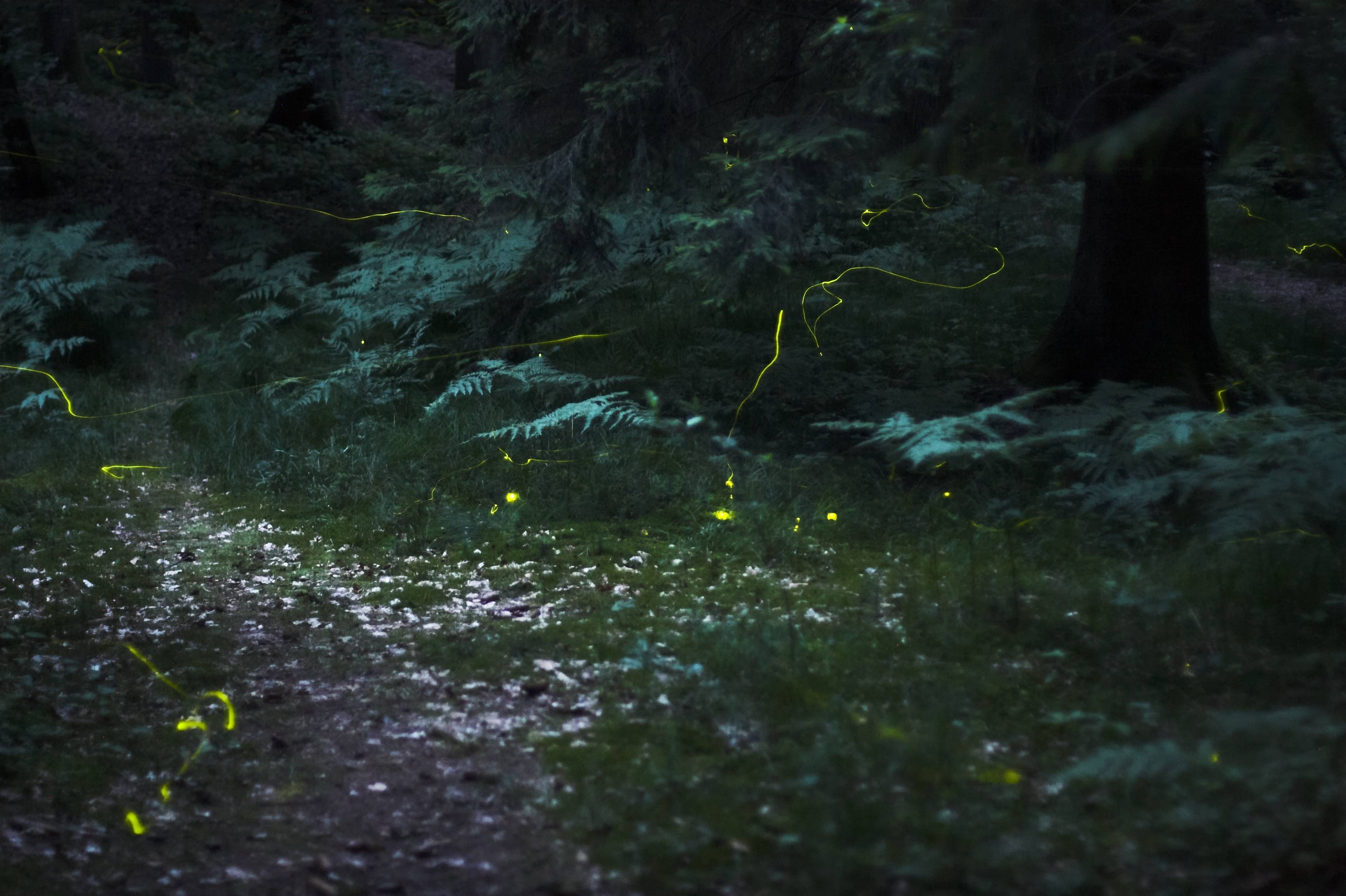
Fireflies at twilight, long exposure

The various patterns of activity are thought to be mainly antipredator adaptations, though some could equally well be predatory adaptations. Many predators forage most intensively at night, whereas others are active at midday and see best in full sun. The crepuscular habit may both reduce predation pressure, increasing the crepuscular populations, and offer better foraging opportunities to predators that increasingly focus their attention on crepuscular prey until a new balance is struck. Such shifting states of balance are often found in ecology.

Some predatory species adjust their habits in response to competition from other predators. For example, the subspecies of short-eared owl that lives on the Galápagos Islands is normally active during the day, but on islands like Santa Cruz that are home to the Galapagos hawk, the owl is crepuscular.

Apart from the relevance to predation, crepuscular activity in hot climates may be the most effective way of avoiding heat stress while capitalizing on available light.

Crepuscular flight activity is preferred by some animals, such as the walnut twig beetle, due to warmer temperatures, moderate wind speeds, and low barometric pressure.

Crepuscular activity can be influenced by the lunar cycle due to the change in nocturnal light levels. This creates changes in animal sleep, reproduction, and foraging behaviours; crepuscular animals often become less active during periods of low light.

== Migration ==
Animal patterns of activity sometimes change during migration due to changes in environmental conditions. Mule deer are crepuscular, but they are only active at dusk before and during migration. In the spring, they are only active at dawn because the snow is at its hardest, so it is easier for the deer to move without sinking in the snow.

During migration, some types of swallow are active primarily during daytime hours with some activity during twilight hours.

== Human impact on crepuscular behaviour ==
Crepuscular animal activity is affected by human activity, because humans are diurnal (active during day). Crepuscular animals are less likely to participate in typical foraging or reproductive behaviors and experience increased stress and mortality when humans are present.

Animals may change their usual activity patterns in response to the presence of humans. For example, Asian black bears may avoid areas with high human activity during the day, but go to these locations during twilight or nighttime hours.

Light pollution impacts crepuscular behaviour because it mimics natural light conditions, leading crepuscular animals to behave as they would on nights with more moonlight.

== Occurrence of crepuscular behaviour ==
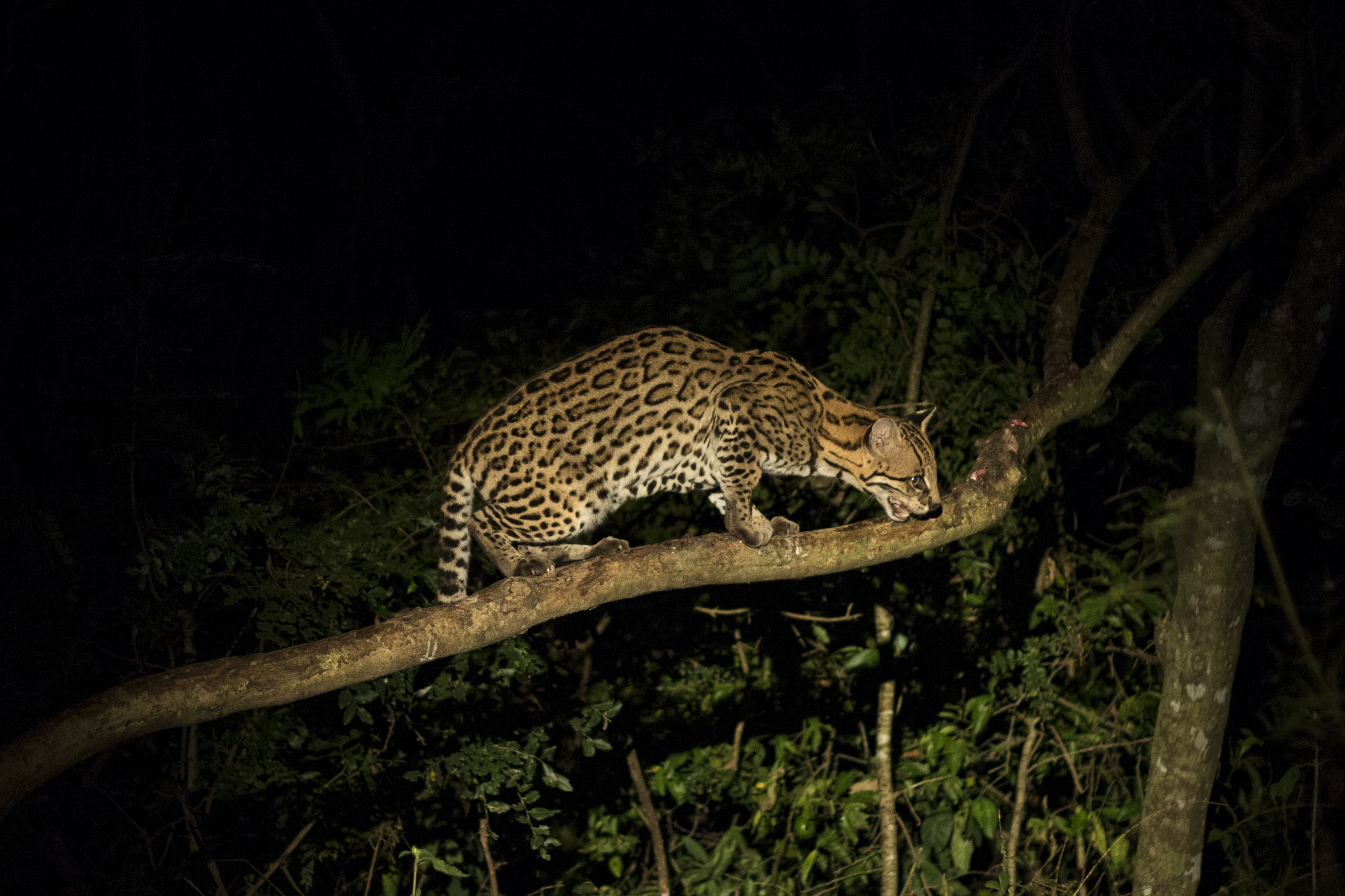
Ocelots are active at night, especially during dawn and dusk.

Many familiar mammal species are crepuscular, including the endangered Amazon river dolphin, some species of bats, hamsters, housecats, stray dogs, rabbits, ferrets, rats, jaguars, ocelots, bobcats, servals, strepsirrhines, red pandas, bears, deer, moose, sitatunga, capybaras, chinchillas, the common mouse, skunks, squirrels, foxes, wombats, wallabies, possums and marsupial gliders, tenrecs, and spotted hyenas.

Snakes, lizards, and frogs, especially those in desert environments, may be crepuscular.

Crepuscular birds include the common nighthawk, barn owl, owlet-nightjar, chimney swift, American woodcock, spotted crake, white-breasted waterhen, and European nightjar.

Many moths, beetles, flies, and other insects are crepuscular and vespertine. For example, Coprophanaeus ensifer, a South American necrophagous beetle, is most active at dusk and dawn.

== See also ==
- Cathemerality – Irregular organismal activity pattern
- Crypsis – Aspect of animal behaviour and morphology
- Diurnality – Behavior characterized by activity during the day and sleeping during the night
- Nocturnality – Behavior characterized by activity during the night and sleeping during the day
